= Listed buildings in Sutton, Craven =

Sutton, Craven is a civil parish in the county of North Yorkshire, England. It contains 24 listed buildings that are recorded in the National Heritage List for England. All the listed buildings are designated at Grade II, the lowest of the three grades, which is applied to "buildings of national importance and special interest". The parish contains the village of Sutton-in-Craven and the surrounding countryside. Most of the listed buildings are houses, cottages, farmhouses and farm buildings. The others include a public house, a church, the entrance to a demolished hall, two follies, a war memorial and a telephone kiosk.

== Buildings ==
| Name and location | Photograph | Date | Notes |
|---|---|---|---|
| The Old Manor House; 53.89256°N 1.99325°W | — | Early 17th century | The remaining part of a larger house, it is in stone, with quoins, a stone slate roof and two storeys. Most of the windows are mullioned, the ground floor window on the front has seven lights, and the window above has four. On the right gable end is a small round-headed window and a porch. |
| 16 West Lane; 53.89106°N 1.99326°W | | 1638 | The house, which has been much altered, is in whitewashed stone, it has a stone slate roof with a coped gable and kneelers on the left, and two storeys. The doorway has a chamfered surround and flanking chamfered windows, and the lintel is inscribed with initials and the date. Most of the other windows are 19th-century casements. |
| 10 and 12 West Lane; 53.89108°N 1.99312°W | | 1639 | The house is in whitewashed stone with a stone slate roof. There are two storeys and three bays, and a projecting outshut on the right. On the front are two doorways with chamfered surrounds, one with a hood on consoles, and double chamfered windows with mullions, those on the ground floor with hood moulds. |
| Bay Horse Inn and Orchard House; 53.89097°N 1.99131°W | | 17th century (probable) | A pair of houses, one formerly a public house, in stone, with a stone slate roof, two storeys and four bays. Each house has a doorway with a pediment, and above the doorway of the former public house is an inscribed date and a name. The windows on the front have three stepped lights and mullions. At the rear are mullioned windows, those on the ground floor with hood moulds., and a doorway over which is an inscribed and dated stone. |
| Craven House; 53.89225°N 1.99344°W | — | 17th century | The house is in stone, with quoins, and a stone slate roof with kneelers. There are two storeys and three bays. The doorway has a chamfered surround, and the windows are mullioned, those on the ground floor with hood moulds. |
| Sutton House; 53.88969°N 1.99174°W | — | Mid-17th century | The house is in stone on a plinth, with rusticated quoins, a cornice, and a stone slate roof. There are two storeys, the front range has three bays, and there is a rear wing with kneelers. The central doorway has an eared architrave, a pulvinated frieze, and a cornice. The windows on the front are casements, and on the rear wing are mullioned windows, some with transoms. |
| Bent Farmhouse; 53.89379°N 2.00637°W | — | 1658 | The farmhouse is in stone, and has a stone slate roof and two storeys. The doorway has a dated and initialled lintel. Most of the windows are mullioned, and some mullions are missing. |
| Cranberry Hole Farmhouse; 53.88522°N 2.00037°W | — | Late 17th century (probable) | The farmhouse is in stone with a stone slate roof. There are two storeys and two bays. The doorway has a chamfered surround and a decorated lintel. Over the doorway is a single light window, and the other windows are mullioned. |
| High Jack Field Farmhouse and barn 53.88694°N 2.01088°W | — | Late 17th century (probable) | The farmhouse and barn are in stone, with a stone slate roof and two storeys. The house has been altered, and contains mullioned windows with some mullions missing. The barn is later, and has a doorway with a chamfered surround. |
| Long House Farmhouse; 53.88185°N 1.98427°W | — | Late 17th century | The farmhouse is in stone, with a stone slate roof, two storeys and four bays. On the front, to the left, is an enclosed stone porch, and a doorway with a chamfered surround and a triangular head, and to the right is a doorway with a plain surround. The ground floor contains mullioned windows, with some mullions missing, some with hood moulds, and on the upper floor are 19th-century sash windows. |
| Garter Farmhouse and barn 53.87594°N 1.99473°W | — | 1695 | The farmhouse and barn are in one range, they are in stone, and have a stone slate roof with copings and kneelers. On the north side is a porch and 19th-century windows, and the south side has windows with mullions missing. The barn has a blocked cart entry, and a blocked chamfered doorway with an initialled datestone. |
| 3 and 5 Elm Road; 53.89316°N 1.99414°W | — | Late 17th or early 18th century (probable) | A farmhouse, later two houses, in stone with a stone slate roof. There are two storeys, three bays, and later rear wings. The windows either have a single light, or are mullioned, and the ground floor windows have hood moulds, one of them extending over one of the two doorways. |
| Crag Farmhouse; 53.88802°N 2.00445°W | | Late 18th century (probable) | The farmhouse is in stone, and has a stone slate roof with kneelers. There are two storeys and two bays, and a rear outshut. The windows are mullioned, and on the outshut are two re-set datestones, one with a hood mould. |
| Garden Place; 53.89546°N 1.98519°W | — | Late 18th century | The house is in stone, and has a stone slate roof with gable coping and kneelers. There are two storeys and three bays. The doorway is in the centre, above it is a single light window, and the other windows are mullioned with three lights. On the right gable end is a blocked doorway. |
| Prospect House; 53.89282°N 1.99395°W | — | Late 18th century | Two cottages combined into a house, it is in stone with quoins, and a stone slate roof with copings and kneelers. There are two storeys and three bays. In the centre are paired doorways with pediments, above them is a single-light window, and the outer bays contains stepped three-light mullioned windows. |
| 7 King's Court; 53.89120°N 1.99320°W | — | 1789 | The house is in stone, with quoins, and a stone slate roof with coping and kneelers. There are two storeys and three bays. The doorway has a pediment with the date and initials in the tympanum, and the windows are mullioned with three lights. |
| Black Bull Inn; 53.89311°N 1.99260°W | | Late 18th or early 19th century | The public house is in stone, with quoins, and a stone slate roof with copings and kneelers. There are two storeys and five bays, the left bay wider and gabled. The doorway on the left bay has a rectangular fanlight, and in the fourth bay is a blocked carriage arch. The upper floor windows in the second and third bays are mullioned, and the other windows are sashes or modern windows. |
| Wood Top Farmhouse and barn 53.88051°N 1.99063°W | | Late 18th or early 19th century | The farmhouse and barn are in stone, with quoins and a stone slate roof. There are two storeys and three bays. On the front is a porch with a moulded doorway, and a gable with a dated finial. The windows are mullioned, with one mullion missing. |
| St Thomas' Church; 53.89355°N 1.99042°W | | 1868–69 | The church, designed by W. H. Crossland, is in stone with a slate roof, and consists of a nave with a clerestory, north and south aisles, a north porch, a chancel, a north organ loft, and a west tower. The tower has diagonal buttresses, a string course with a grotesque gargoyle on each corner, louvred bell openings with hood moulds, and an embattled parapet with crocketed pinnacles. On the organ loft is a rose window. |
| Lodges, archway and walls 53.89044°N 1.99257°W | | Late 19th century | At the entrance to Sutton Hall, which has been demolished, is an archway in stone, consisting of a wide Tudor arch on coupled fluted Doric pilasters, with an embattled parapet. This is flanked by narrow entrances, and octagonal towers with three stages, porches, lancet windows and plain parapets. Outside these are lodges with two storeys and two gabled bays. The inner bays contain a two-light dormer with a shaped gable, and on the outer bays is a rectangular bay window with ten lights. Flanking these are walls containing piers joined by arcades. |
| Lund's Tower; 53.88379°N 2.01333°W | | 1887 | The tower is a folly on Earl Crag. It is in stone, and consists of a small square tower with a plinth and battlements on corbels. Near the base is a band, and there are two stages, the upper stage jettied out. |
| Wainman's Pinnacle; 53.88229°N 2.02445°W | | 1898 | A folly on Earl Crag, it is in stone. It consists of a tapering obelisk with a triangular section, coping, and a spike finial. |
| War memorial 53.89449°N 1.99187°W | | 1921 | The war memorial in Sutton-in-Craven Park is in sandstone. It consists of a Latin cross on a slightly tapering octagonal collared shaft. This stands on an octagonal moulded base on a square pedestal with a cornice. The pedestal is mounted on a plinth with a chamfered and moulded cornice and a splayed foot, on a two-step base on a low podium. On the pedestal and the base are bronze plaques with inscriptions and the names of those lost in the two World Wars. |
| Telephone kiosk 53.89285°N 1.99246°W | — | 1935 | The telephone kiosk is of the K6 type designed by Giles Gilbert Scott. Constructed in cast iron with a square plan and a dome, it has three unperforated crowns in the top panels. |
