= The Hitching Stone =

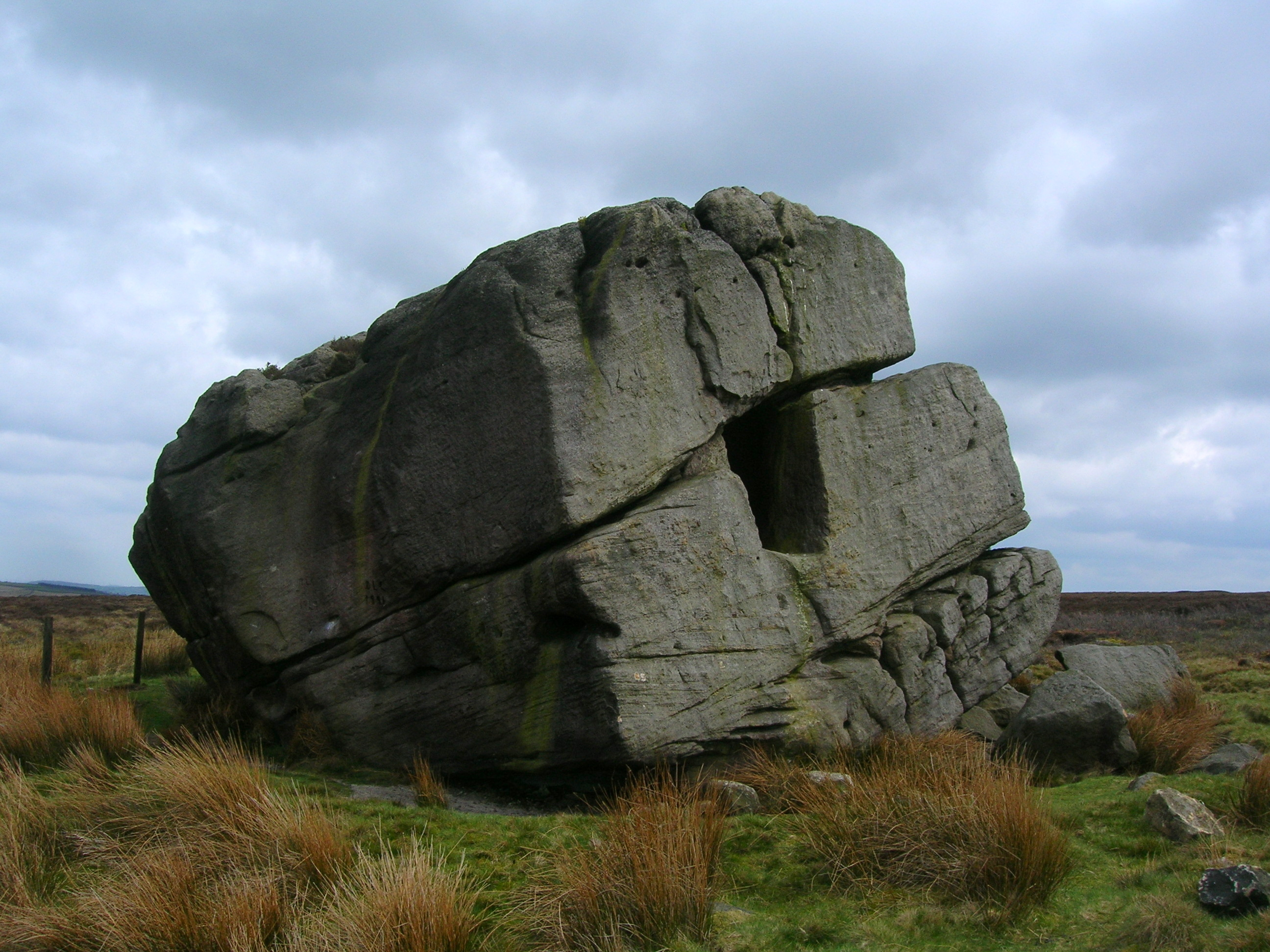
- The Hitching Stone, showing the fissure and rectangular hole known as the druid’s chair

- Location within North Yorkshire
- 53.871513°N 2.021789°W
- Location: Earl Crag, Yorkshire
- Nearest city: Bradford
- OS grid reference: SD9841

Site notes
- Elevation: 1,200 ft (370 m)
- Height: 21 ft (6.4 m)

The Hitching Stone is a gritstone erratic block on Keighley Moor, North Yorkshire, near Earl Crag and the village of Cowling. It is very close to the border between North Yorkshire and West Yorkshire and the border between Yorkshire and Lancashire.

It is said to be the largest boulder in Yorkshire at 29 feet (8.8 metres) long, 25 feet (7.6 metres) wide and 21 feet (6.4 metres) high. It is also said to weigh a lot more than 1000 tonnes.

== Geography ==
The Hitching Stone is five miles (eight kilometres) from the town of Keighley and is at an elevation of 1,200 feet (370 metres).

== History ==
The Hitching Stone and all the other erratic boulders on Keighley Moor were put in place thousands to possibly millions of years ago during the Pleistocene Epoch. The Hitching Stone most likely originally came from Earl Crag during this time. As a result of the fact that The Hitching Stone lies at the borders of historic counties, ancient councils and parliaments met at the stone and markets, fairs, and other gatherings were also held at the stone, with the last fair being held in 1870.

== Features ==
On the southern side of the boulder a large bath-like recess is found, that fills with rain water. A large recess in the western side of the stone is still known today as the Priests Chair. There is some speculation that the stone was used for religious rituals.

== Gallery ==
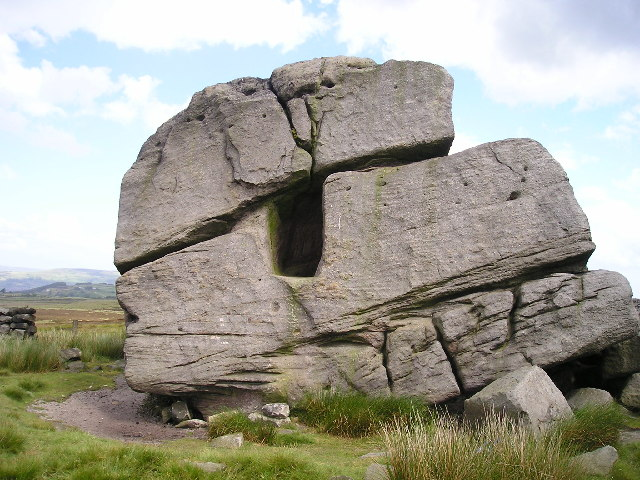
The Hitching Stone

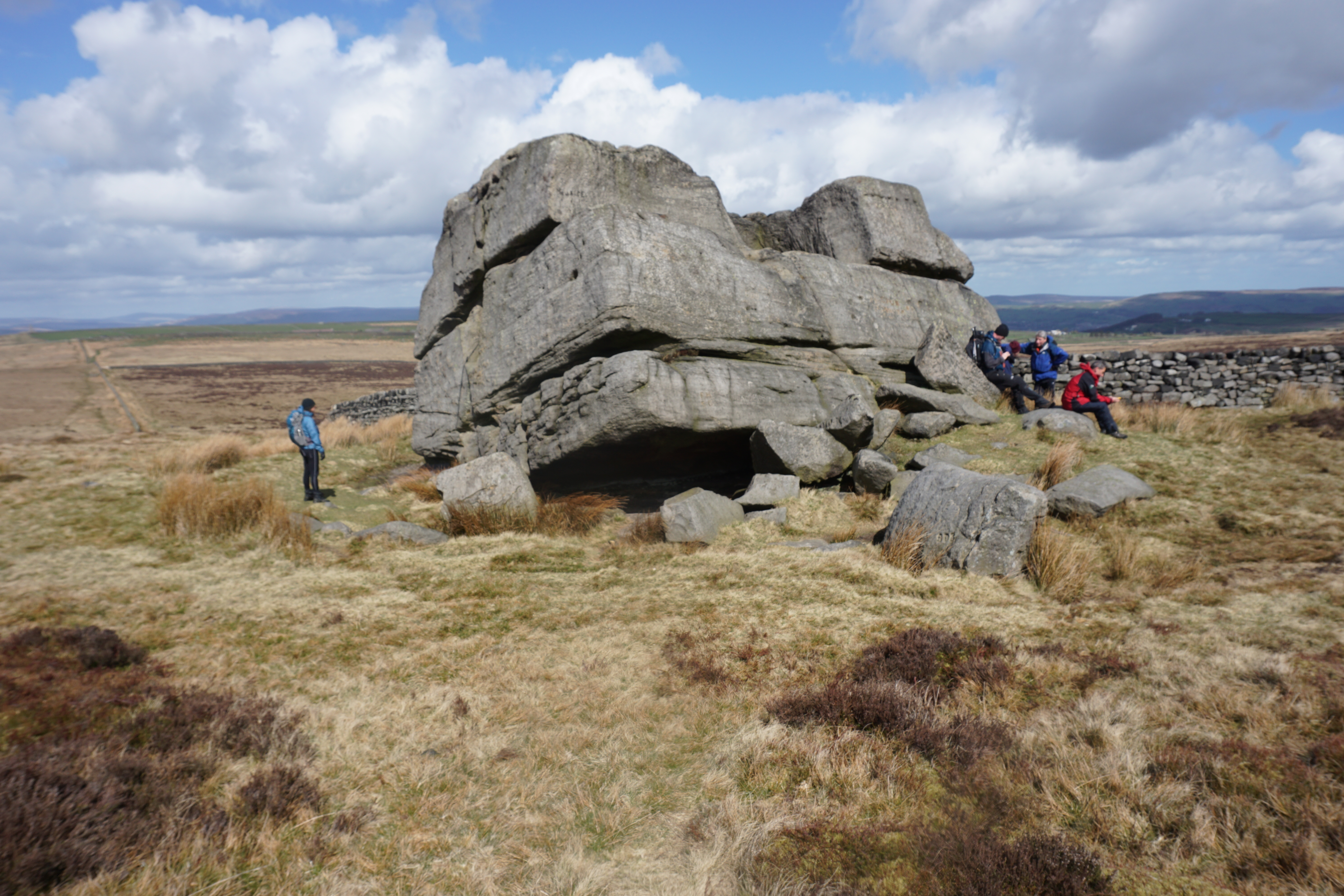
People visiting the Hitching Stone

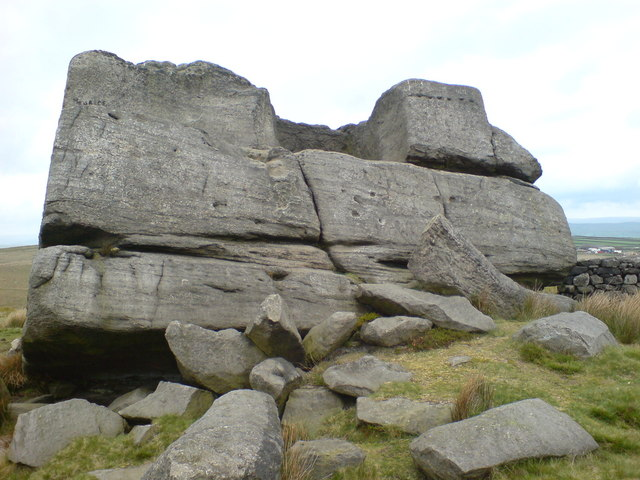
The south side of the Hitching Stone

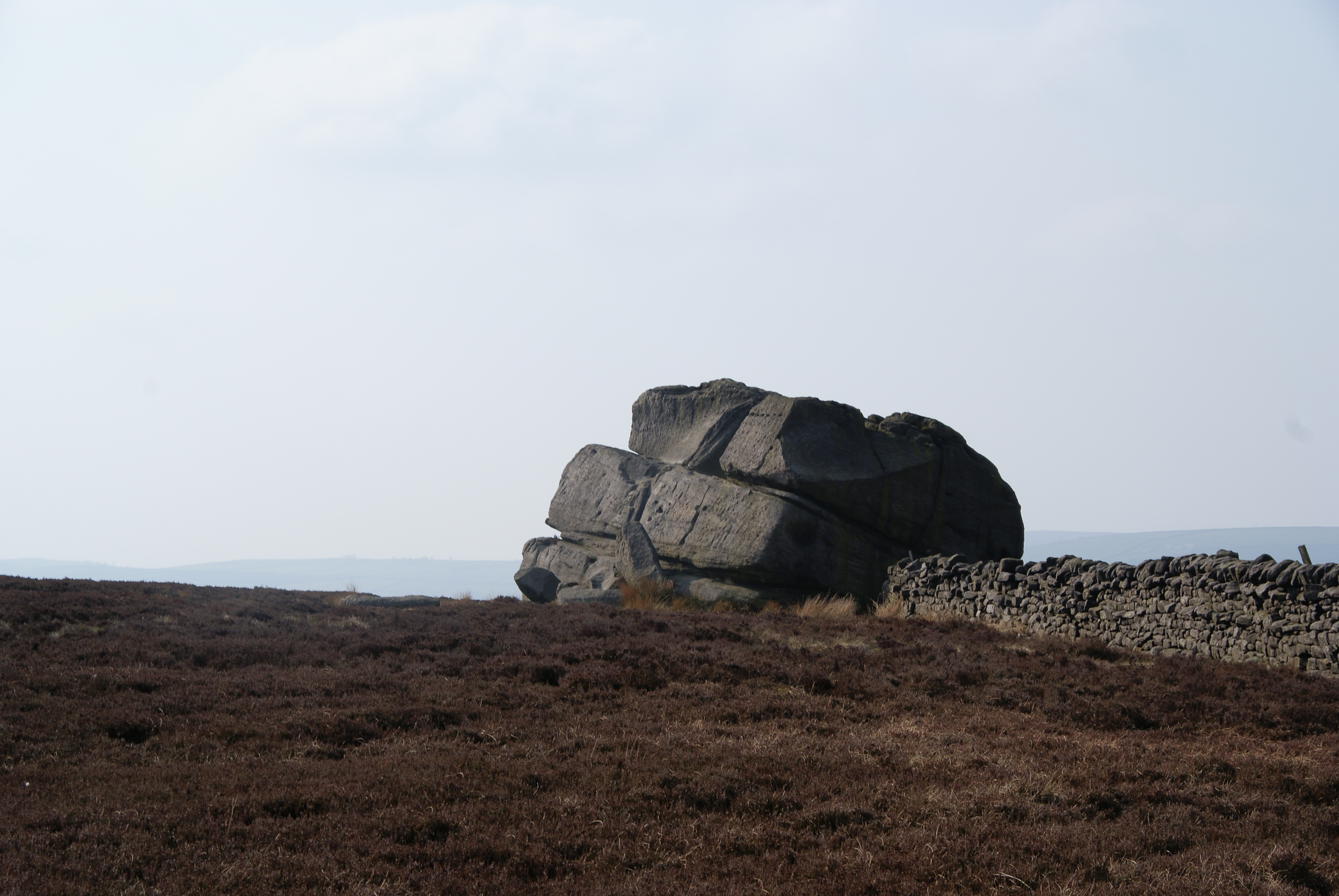
The Hitching Stone from the east

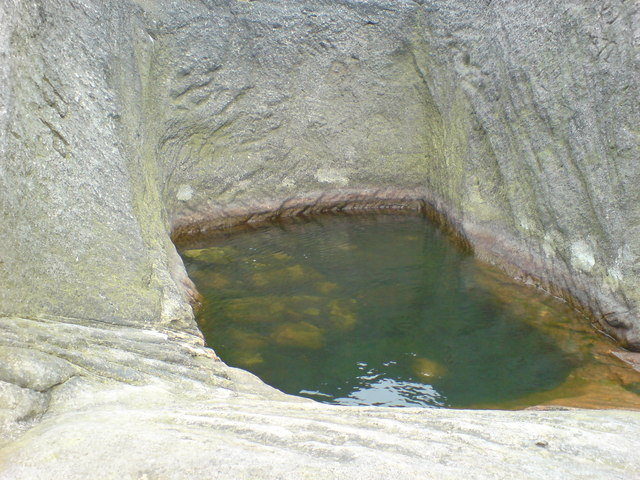
The pool of water in the Hitching Stone

== See also ==
- List of individual rocks
- Lund's Tower
- Wainman's Pinnacle
