= Cross Hills =

Village in North Yorkshire, England

Coordinates: 53°54′07″N 1°59′17″W

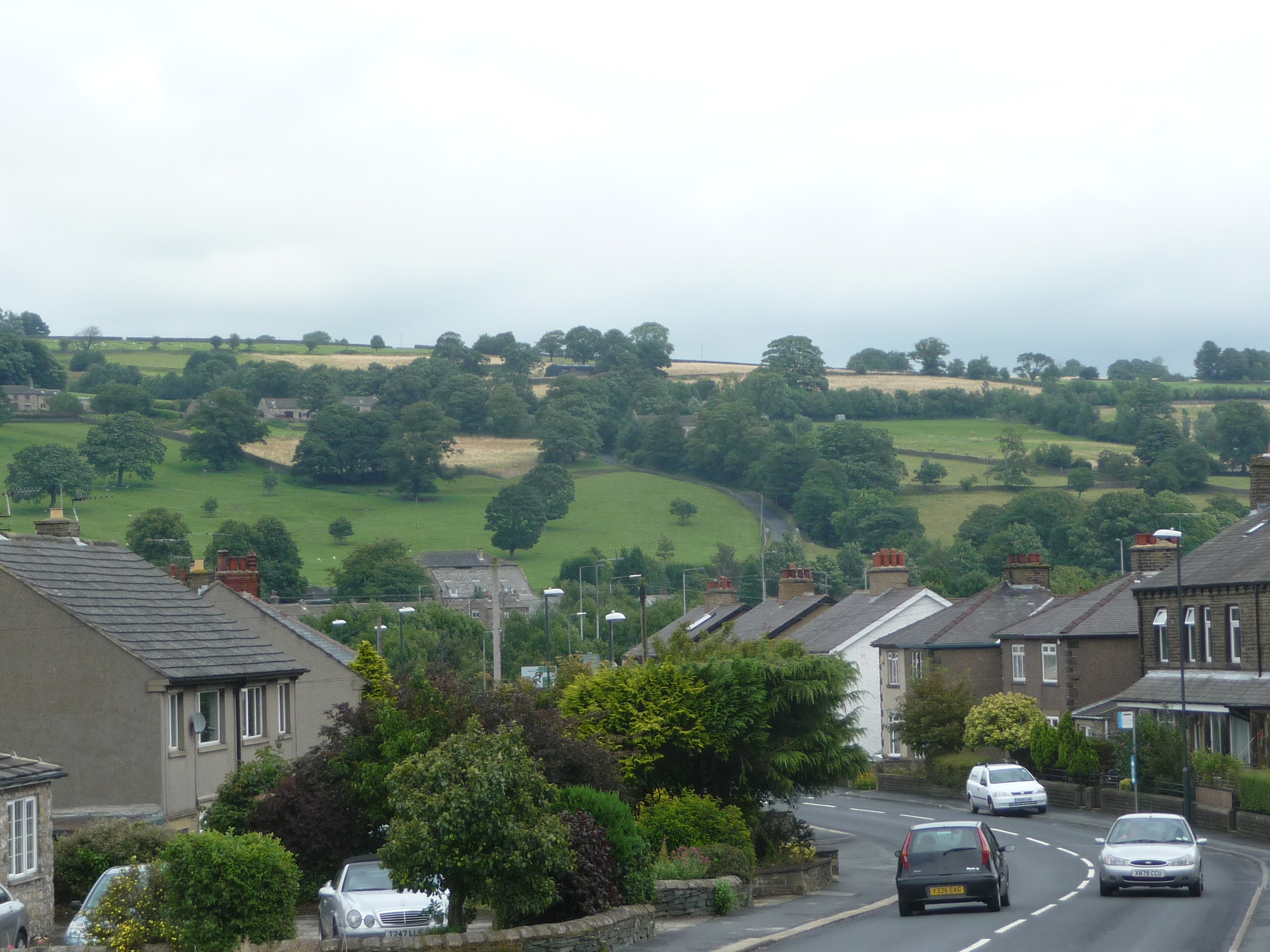
- Street in Cross Hills

- Location within North Yorkshire
- OS grid reference: SE013449
- Civil parish: Glusburn and Cross Hills
- Unitary authority: North Yorkshire
- Ceremonial county: North Yorkshire
- Region: Yorkshire and the Humber
- Country: England
- Sovereign state: United Kingdom
- Post town: KEIGHLEY
- Postcode district: BD20
- Dialling code: 01535
- Police: North Yorkshire
- Fire: North Yorkshire
- Ambulance: Yorkshire
- UK Parliament: Skipton & Ripon

Cross Hills is a village in the county of North Yorkshire, England, situated halfway between Skipton and Keighley. The village is at the centre of a built-up area that includes the adjoining settlements of Glusburn, Kildwick, Eastburn and Sutton-in-Craven. Cross Hills is the newer part of the civil parish now called Glusburn and Cross Hills, historically known as Glusburn.

Until 1974 it was part of the West Riding of Yorkshire. From 1974 to 2023 it was part of the Craven District, it is now administered by the unitary North Yorkshire Council.

== Geography ==
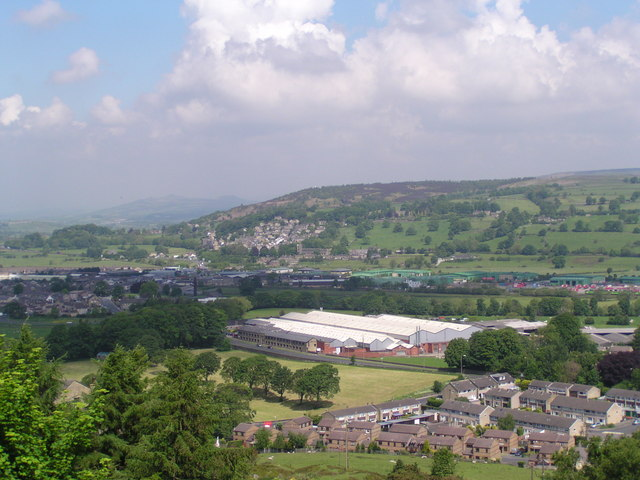
Cross Hills and its surroundings

Cross Hills is in Airedale at a point where the River Aire bends east from its north–south course. The village lies on the south bank of the river just above the flood plain, which is wholly agricultural. As its name implies, Cross Hills is surrounded by the hills of the eastern Pennines including Steeton Moor (south-east), Cowling Moor (south-west), White Hill (north-west) and Kildwick Moor (north-east). There are views along the Aire Valley itself to the north and east. Rombalds Moor, between Silsden and Ilkley, is about six miles east of Cross Hills. Skipton is about four miles north and the hills of the Yorkshire Dales can be seen beyond it.

Immediately south-west of Cross Hills is Glusburn. Due north, on the other side of the River Aire is Kildwick. Sutton-in-Craven is less than a mile to the south-west and Eastburn less than a mile to the south-east. Cross Hills is separated from Sutton-in-Craven and Eastburn by the beck which flows into the Aire just east of Cross Hills. The beck is known by various names: Surgill Beck, Holme Beck and Eastburn Beck. It forms part of the county boundary between North and West Yorkshire as it approaches the Aire, Eastburn being in West Yorkshire.

Cross Hills is split by the Airedale Line of the former Midland Railway. The biggest part is south of the railway and is largely residential with most of the shops and restaurants on or near Main Street (the A6068). North of the railway, former farmland has been given over to light industry and commerce but with some residential property on Station Road which connects the A6068 and the A629.

== History ==
The village originated as an outgrowth of the much older Glusburn (which is mentioned in the Domesday Book).

Cross Hills is overlooked by two monuments known as The Pinnacles, which take the form of small towers, standing on Earl Crag above Cowling Moor:

- Wainman's Pinnacle or Sutton's Spare Pinnacle, is an obelisk built reportedly by a local man named Richard or William Wainman, some time between 1816 and 1830. There are varying accounts of the date and reasons for its construction: one anecdote claims that it was a memorial to Wainman's son, who had been killed during the Napoleonic Wars, while another account suggests that it commemorates the Allied victory at the Battle of Waterloo (1815).
- Lund's Tower, or Sutton Pinnacle was built in 1896 by James Lund of Malsis Hall, to commemorate Queen Victoria's diamond jubilee; it is square with an internal staircase and topped by a crenelated parapet.

The Pinnacles are known colloquially as the "Salt Pot" and "Pepper Pot"; both stand in the parish of Sutton.

== Transport ==
The village is close to the main A629, connecting Keighley and Skipton. The A6068 trans-Pennine route from Colne forms the village's Main Street and joins the A629 at the large roundabout between Cross Hills and nearby Kildwick. The A6068 forms Colne Road through Glusburn and becomes Main Street at the junction with Wheatlands Lane. It joins Park Road, which climbs due west out of the village and provides routes to Cononley and Lothersdale.

There are regular bus services between Keighley, Skipton, Burnley and Colne that serve the village.

The local Kildwick and Crosshills railway station, opened in 1847, was closed in 1965. It was just off Station Road where the humpback bridge crosses the railway. The nearest station is now Steeton and Silsden, two miles to the east.

== Amenities ==
The village has a large health centre on Holme Lane and is only a mile or so from the Airedale NHS Trust hospital at Steeton with Eastburn in West Yorkshire. There is a public library and a police station. South Craven School, a secondary and sixth form college, is located in Cross Hills off Holme Lane, which is the road from Cross Hills to Sutton-in-Craven. The local primary schools are in Sutton-in-Craven, Glusburn and Kildwick.

Cross Hills has no Church of England parish church of its own and is part of the parish of St Andrew's Church across the Aire in Kildwick. Cross Hills contains St Peter's Methodist Church, St Joseph's Catholic Church and South Craven Evangelical Church.

Cross Hills Football Club plays in the Craven and District Football League and Glusburn Cricket Club is also located in the area. The Cross Hills tennis and bowling club has three tennis courts and one bowling green.

== Commerce ==
Cross Hills was the original home of chocolatier Whitakers, now based in Skipton, which was established in 1889. Ida Whitaker began making chocolates in 1903, taught by the wife of the vicar of Kildwick.

== Notable people ==
The Yorkshire and England cricketer Herbert Sutcliffe died in a Cross Hills nursing home on 22 January 1978, aged 83.

J. Arthur Dixon (1897–1958), founder of the eponymous manufacturer of greetings cards and postcards, was born at Cross Hills.

== See also ==
- Listed buildings in Glusburn and Cross Hills
