= The Old White Bear, Cross Hills =

Pub in Cross Hills, North Yorkshire, England

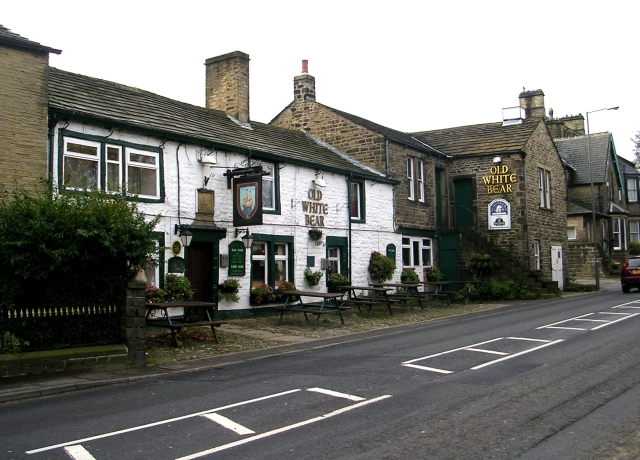
The pub, in 2008

The Old White Bear is a historic pub in Cross Hills, a village in North Yorkshire in England.

The pub was built in 1735, as a coaching inn. It has been considerably altered since, and an ancillary building to the right became ruinous before being restored in the 19th century. The building has served numerous functions, including acting as a meeting place for the local council, a dance hall and a brothel. In the early 21st century, it was owned by the local Naylor's Brewery, but in 2007 it became a free house. It has been grade II listed since 1984.

The pub is built of stone with a stone slate roof, two storeys and three bays. The doorway has a hood mould, and above it is a dated and inscribed plaque. To the right is a doorway with a triangular head that has been converted into a window. Some windows are mullioned with some mullions missing, and others are modern. At the rear is a round-headed doorway with impost blocks and a keystone. On the right are ancillary buildings with an external staircase.

== See also ==
- Listed buildings in Glusburn and Cross Hills
