= Sutton Hall =

Sutton Hall may refer to any of the following places:

- Sutton Hall (University of Texas at Austin), The University of Texas at Austin, School of Architecture
- John Sutton Hall, Indiana University of Pennsylvania
- Sutton Hall, Little Sutton, a country house in Cheshire, England
- Sutton Hall, North Yorkshire, a country house in England
- Sutton Hall, Sutton, a country house near Woodbridge in Suffolk, England
- Sutton Hall, Sutton Lane Ends, a former country house in Cheshire, England
- Sutton Hall, Sutton Weaver, a country house in Cheshire, England
- Sutton New Hall, a district in Birmingham, England
- Sutton Coldfield Town Hall, a former hotel in Birmingham
- Sutton Scarsdale Hall, an estate in Chesterfield, Derbyshire, England
