= Glusburn Institute =

Building in Glusburn, North Yorkshire, England

Coordinates: 53°53′58″N 1°59′58″W

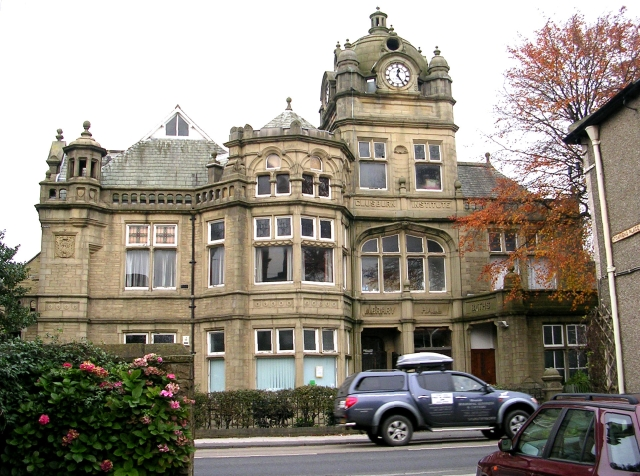
The building, in 2008

The Glusburn Institute is a historic building in Glusburn, a village in North Yorkshire, in England.

The building was commissioned by John Horsfall, who was a supporter of temperance and wished to encourage education and recreation in an alcohol-free environment. It was designed by F. W. Petty in a broadly Renaissance style, and the first section was opened in 1892. In 1897, an extension added a gym on the ground floor, and art rooms above, while the baths were extended in 1905, and a clock tower was added in 1911. On the ground floor were a library, reading room, billiard room, dining room and public baths; the first floor had a lecture room, also used for religious services, and smaller meeting rooms.

In 1948, the art rooms were converted into a Baptist chapel, and the gym into a Sunday school. In the 1970s, the Horsfall family transferred ownership of the building to a trust, with the local parish council acting as trustees. The church and Sunday school were sold to the Baptists, and partitioned off from the rest of the building. Later, the ground floor dining room and kitchen were converted into a play centre, and the swimming pool closed. The Baptist church closed in 2000, and the property was repurchased by the trust. In 2012, the parish council transferred trusteeship to the trust, which renamed the building as Glusburn Community and Arts Centre. The institute currently provides a range of classes, concerts, plays, and other activities. The building was grade II listed along with its garden wall in 1977.

The building is built of stone with a pierced arcaded parapet, turrets, and a green slate roof. There are two storeys and four irregular bays. On the left corner is an open turret with a stone cap and a ball finial, which is corbelled out above a panel with a florid achievement. The second bay forms a three-storey bay window, and the clock tower in the third bay has a stone dome and four domed pinnacles. Most of the windows are mullioned and transomed, and attached to the building is a low stone wall with domed piers and iron railings.

== See also ==
- Listed buildings in Glusburn and Cross Hills
