= South Craven School =

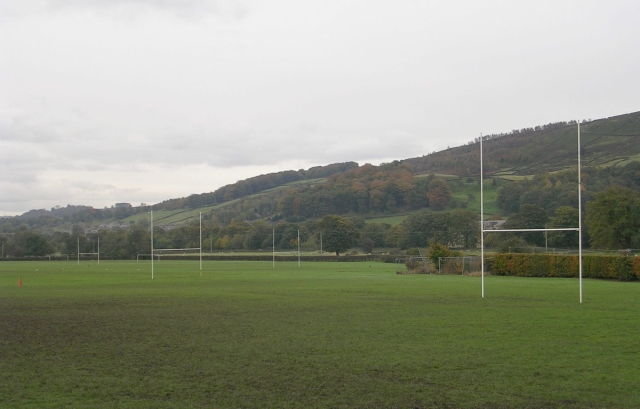
- Playing fields

Location
- Holme Lane; Cross Hills, North Yorkshire, BD20 7RL; England
- Coordinates: 53°53′59″N 1°59′20″W

Information
- Type: Academy
- Motto: Valuing All our Successes
- Established: 1957
- Department for Education URN: 136736 Tables
- Ofsted: Reports
- Chair: Emma Benn
- Headteacher: Martyn Hill
- Staff: 200
- Gender: Coeducational
- Age: 11 to 19
- Enrolment: 1,678
- Colours: (All in year 7-11 change on an Annual Basis) Year 7: Navy, Years 8: Grey, year 9: Burgundy, Year 10: Bottle Green, Year 11: Black, Sixth Form: No Uniform
- Website: http://www.southcraven.org/

South Craven School is a coeducational secondary school and sixth form with academy status, located in Cross Hills, North Yorkshire, England. It is the largest school in the Craven District and carries over 1,700 pupils.

The school has formed partnerships with The Ogden Trust, Airedale NHS Trust a prominent employer in the local area, Craven College a local further education college and long-term partner Bradford University who work closely on STEM subjects (Science, Technology, Engineering and Mathematics) at the school, Leeds Trinity University, Leeds College of Music and finally the Bradford Local Authority.

South Craven School became an academy on 1 May 2011.

== Admission arrangements ==
=== Entrance at KS3 ===
Students are admitted without reference to ability or aptitude. Where applications for admission exceed the number of places available; Admissions procedures have been put in place to help allot places appropriately where this is the case.

=== Sixth Form arrangements ===
To enter South Craven Sixth Form and take level 3 courses, students need to have achieved Grade A*-C passes at GCSE, or passes in other level 2 qualifications (e.g., BTEC, OCR Nationals), in at least 5 separate subjects. (If students are taking a reduced programme, e.g., if they have been ill, an adjustment will be made and an offer made that recognises this situation). This is considered to be the minimum entry requirement.

== Brief history ==
The school was opened on 7 June 1957 by Lord Boyle. It cost just £120,000 to build, with students leaving aged 15. Before it was built, local children attended Glusburn Community Primary School and Hothfield Secondary, in Silsden. When South Craven School first opened, there were just 11 teachers, one headteacher and a secretary. The school now has 1,700 students and more than 200 members of staff.

It became a comprehensive in 1967 and the leaving age was raised to 16 in 1972. At the same time it established its own sixth form so students could stay on to take their A levels.

== Development of facilities ==
- In 2009 the eTaSC Building was opened, at a cost of £1.5 million to support Post-16 Vocational study at South Craven School
- In 2010 a new Astro-Turf, and multi-games pitch was opened.
- In 2010 a new facility, simply called "A1" was opened, and serves as a base for learning support at the school. The opening was attended by Skipton and Ripon MP, Julian Smith
- In 2011 a new covered sports facility was opened to provide improved all weather sports facilities at the school.
- In 2012 a new building (named Fells) containing a hall, new Learning Resource Centre and various classrooms was opened
- In 2018, the Glusburn building was opened to house the History department, with Business Studies moving into the old History area.

== Notable alumni ==
- Danielle Brown Double Paralympic gold medalist in archery
- Katie Griffiths, actress
- Dougie Lampkin
- Megan Parkinson, actress, director and writer.
- Clare Teal, jazz singer, and Radio 2 presenter
- Andrew Triggs Hodge English rower and a double Olympic Gold Medallist and quadruple World Champion. Oxford university student who was a member of the Oxford university rowing team and took part in four boat races.
