= Sutton Hall, North Yorkshire =

Country house in North Yorkshire, England

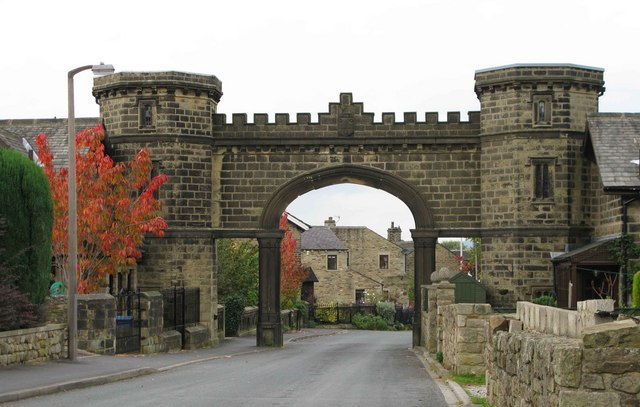
The gateway, in 2009

Sutton Hall was a country house in Sutton-in-Craven, a village in North Yorkshire, in England.

John William Hartley bought the Sutton House estate in 1892. He demolished the old house, and employed Samuel Jackson to design a larger house and lay out the grounds. He had the surrounding farms and houses demolished, and used the space for a park including lawns, a lake with a fountain and an artificial swan, tennis courts, and woodland. The house was in the Jacobethan style with a tower and had two-storey bay windows at each end of the main front. Inside, it had a central entrance staircase hall flanked by a reception room and a dining room, a service wing with kitchens at the rear. Next to it was a stable block, which was completed in 1907. The work cost around £30,000. The house was habitable but incomplete when Hartley died in 1909. Turner's cousin inherited the property, but soon moved out, and in 1932 the estate was sold to a builder, who demolished the house in about 1940 and used the site to build smaller houses.

The former entrance archway to the estate survives, with its lodges and walls (53°53′26″N 1°59′33″W), and is grade II listed. It is built of stone, consisting of a wide Tudor arch on coupled fluted Doric pilasters, with an embattled parapet. This is flanked by narrow entrances, and octagonal towers with three stages, porches, lancet windows and plain parapets. Outside these are lodges with two storeys and two gabled bays. The inner bays contain a two-light dormer with a shaped gable, and on the outer bays is a rectangular bay window with ten lights. Flanking these are walls containing piers joined by arcades. It originally had wrought iron gates, manufactures by Wilson Davy, the local blacksmith. These are now at Cliffe Castle Museum.

== See also ==
- Listed buildings in Sutton, Craven
