= St Thomas' Church, Sutton-in-Craven =

Church in Sutton-in-Craven, North Yorkshire, England

Coordinates: 53°53′37″N 1°59′25″W

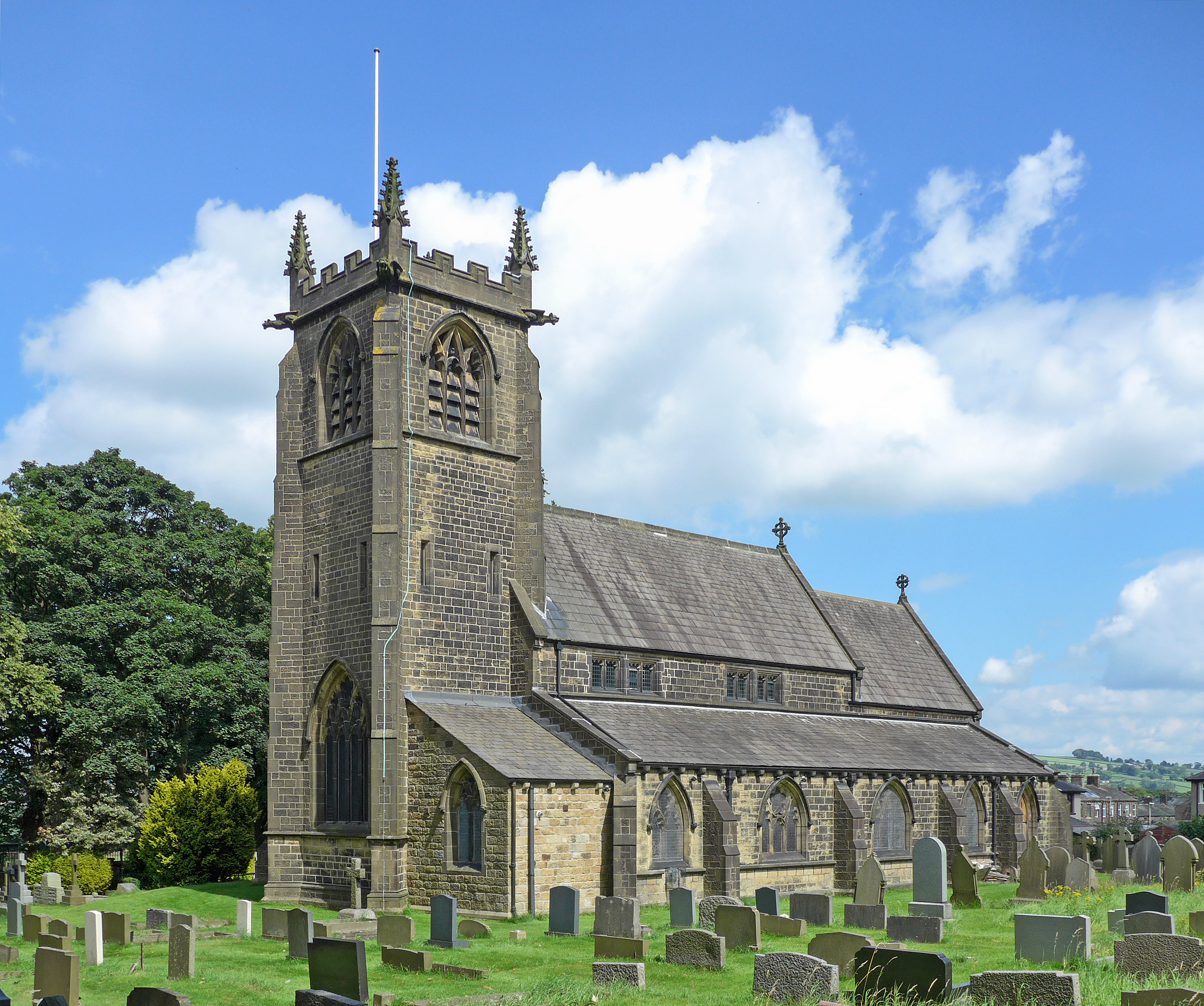
The church, in 2016

St Thomas' Church is an Anglican church in Sutton-in-Craven, a village in North Yorkshire, in England.

Sutton was long in the parish of St Andrew's Church, Kildwick. From 1868 to 1869, a church was constructed in the village, to a design by William Henry Crossland. Crossland intended for the tower to support a spire, but one was never added. The church was Grade II listed in 1984. In 2015, some of the pews were replaced by chairs.

The church is built of stone with a slate roof, and consists of a nave with a clerestory, north and south aisles, a north porch, a chancel, a north organ loft, and a west tower. The tower has diagonal buttresses, a string course with a grotesque gargoyle on each corner, louvred bell openings with hood moulds, and an embattled parapet with crocketed pinnacles. In the organ loft is a rose window. Inside, the capitals are carved in the shape of foliage, each one having a unique design. There is a white marble pulpit and a font in the classical style, and many of the windows contain stained glass.

== See also ==
- Listed buildings in Sutton, Craven
