= Malsis School =

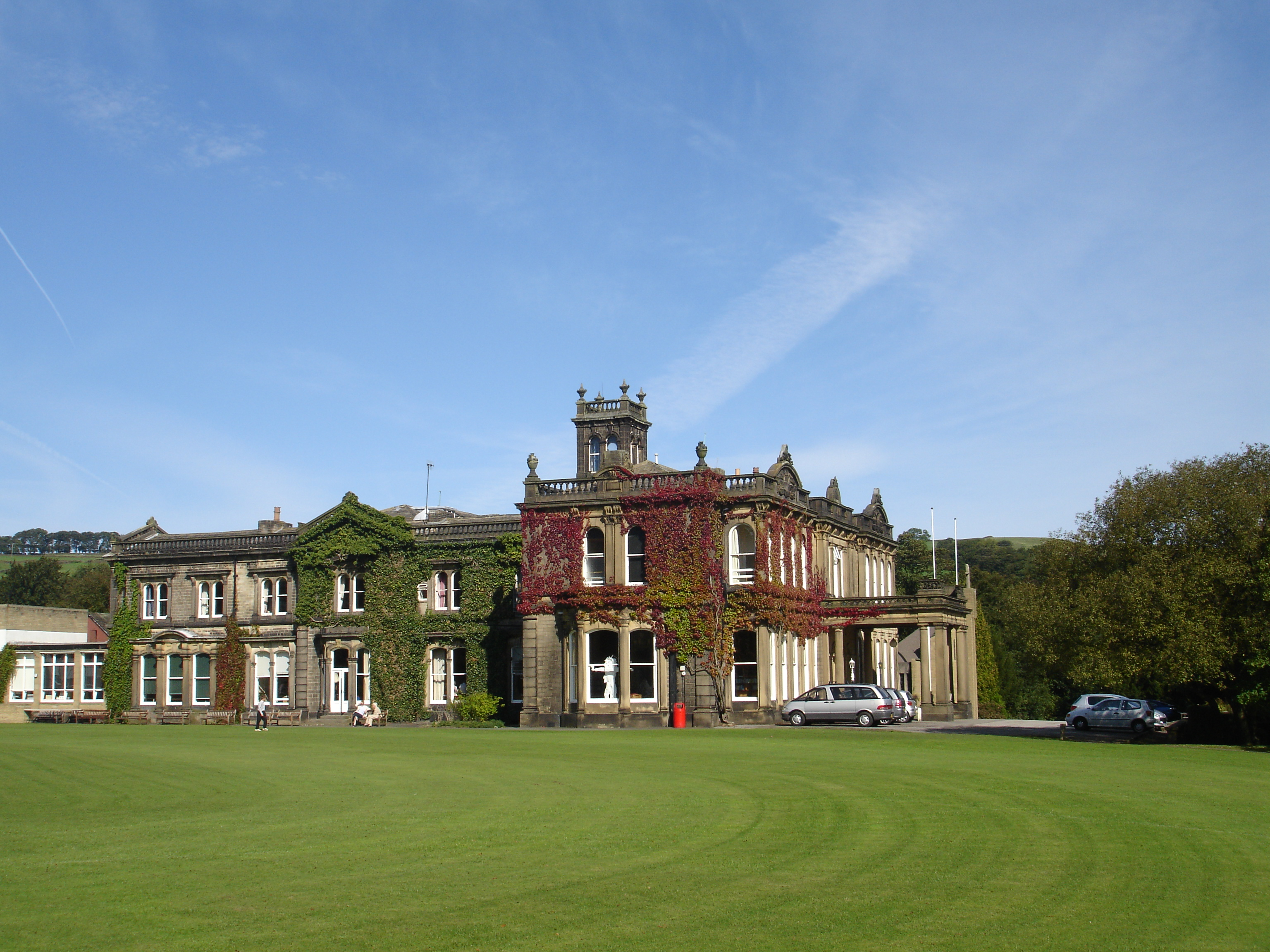

Location
- Cross Hills, North Yorkshire, BD20 8DT; England; 53.896°N 2.0174°W

Information
- Type: Private school
- Motto: Sto Pro Veritate I Stand for the Truth
- Religious affiliation: Church of England
- Established: 14 May 1920
- Founder: Albert Henry Montagu
- Closed: 10 December 2014
- Gender: Mixed
- Age: 3 to 13
- Houses: Lund, Gadney, Montagu and Coates
- Colours: Red & Black

Malsis School located at a mansion known as Malsis Hall in the village of Crosshills, in North Yorkshire, England, was a co-educational independent pre-prep and preparatory school for pupils aged 3 to 13 years. The school was founded in 1920, Facilities at the school included a 3 km mountain bike trail, 9-hole golf course, swimming pool, all weather pitch, rifle range, 40 acres of grounds and a Chapel with windows by the renowned stained-glass artist John Piper.

== Sexual abuse convictions and institutional failure ==
Multiple former staff members have been convicted of historical sexual offences committed against pupils at the school between the 1970s and 1990s. Following police investigations, it was established that the Headmaster during that period, John Clark (Headmaster from 1975–1994), had failed to act on complaints at the time.

=== Peter Holmes ===
Peter Andrew Holmes, a former English teacher and rugby coach employed at the school between 1976 and 1991, was convicted in May 2022 of 28 sexual offences against 18 former pupils. The offences included indecent assault and indecency with a child.

Complaints regarding Holmes were first raised in the 1990s, but he had moved abroad to Taiwan before police enquiries could progress. He was eventually brought to justice decades later and sentenced to 12 years in prison in September 2022. During the Court of Appeal judgment upholding his conviction, it was noted that the Headmaster at the time had received reports of concerns regarding boys visiting Holmes' flat in a state of undress but failed to stop the abuse, and had directed staff that any parental concerns should be directed solely to him.

=== David Hope ===
David John Hope, a former music teacher at the school, was sentenced to 17 years in prison in February 2022 for offences including buggery and indecent assault against a male pupil in the 1980s. Hope had previously served a prison sentence in the 1990s for offences against boys.

Sentencing Hope, Judge Ahmed Nadim stated that Hope had "robbed the boy of his childhood" and inflicted severe psychological harm. North Yorkshire Police described Hope as a "monstrous child abuser" who used a "fake mask of respectability" to prey on pupils.

=== Dr Morley Stuart ===
Dr Morley Stuart, who was appointed as head of classics at Malsis School, has been the subject of posthumous allegations of historical child sexual abuse relating to his prior employment at Elizabeth College in Guernsey between 1976 and 1982. Following an investigation published by The Observer, an independent review was opened into disclosures from former pupils who alleged Stuart had groomed and abused them. The allegations included claims that Stuart plied boys with alcohol and forced them into sexual touching. Stuart eventually left the teaching profession to become a monk under the name Brother James Simon, and died the year before the investigation was announced.

=== Institutional response ===
Legal proceedings and independent reports have highlighted systemic failures at the school during the period the abuse occurred. The Court of Appeal noted that the school showed "utter disregard for the welfare of the pupils," which allowed staff to act with "virtual impunity." Civil claims have been brought against the school's trust and administrators by former pupils seeking compensation for the abuse and the institution's failure to protect them.

== Headmasters ==
The following individuals served as headmaster of Malsis School from its founding until the late 1990s:

- 1920–1937: Albert Henry Montagu (Founder)
- 1937–1965: Bernard Gadney (During his service in the Royal Navy from 1943, H.C.S. Perry and Mrs. Gadney ran the school)
- 1965–1975: Gerald Watts
- 1975–1994: John Clark
- 1995–1998: Norman Rowbotham
- 1998–2014: John Elder

== Closure ==
The school closed on 10 December 2014 due to falling pupil numbers. The closure followed a failed merger with Giggleswick School. The school's trust went into administration with Ernst & Young of Leeds. The school's assets were auctioned off and the land and building sold by Eddisons. Having fully paid off its debts it passed into creditors voluntary liquidation and the company was finally dissolved on 4 August 2017 according to Companies House.

In January 2015, The Old Malsis Association (OMA) was formed to represent the views of school alumni from down the years.

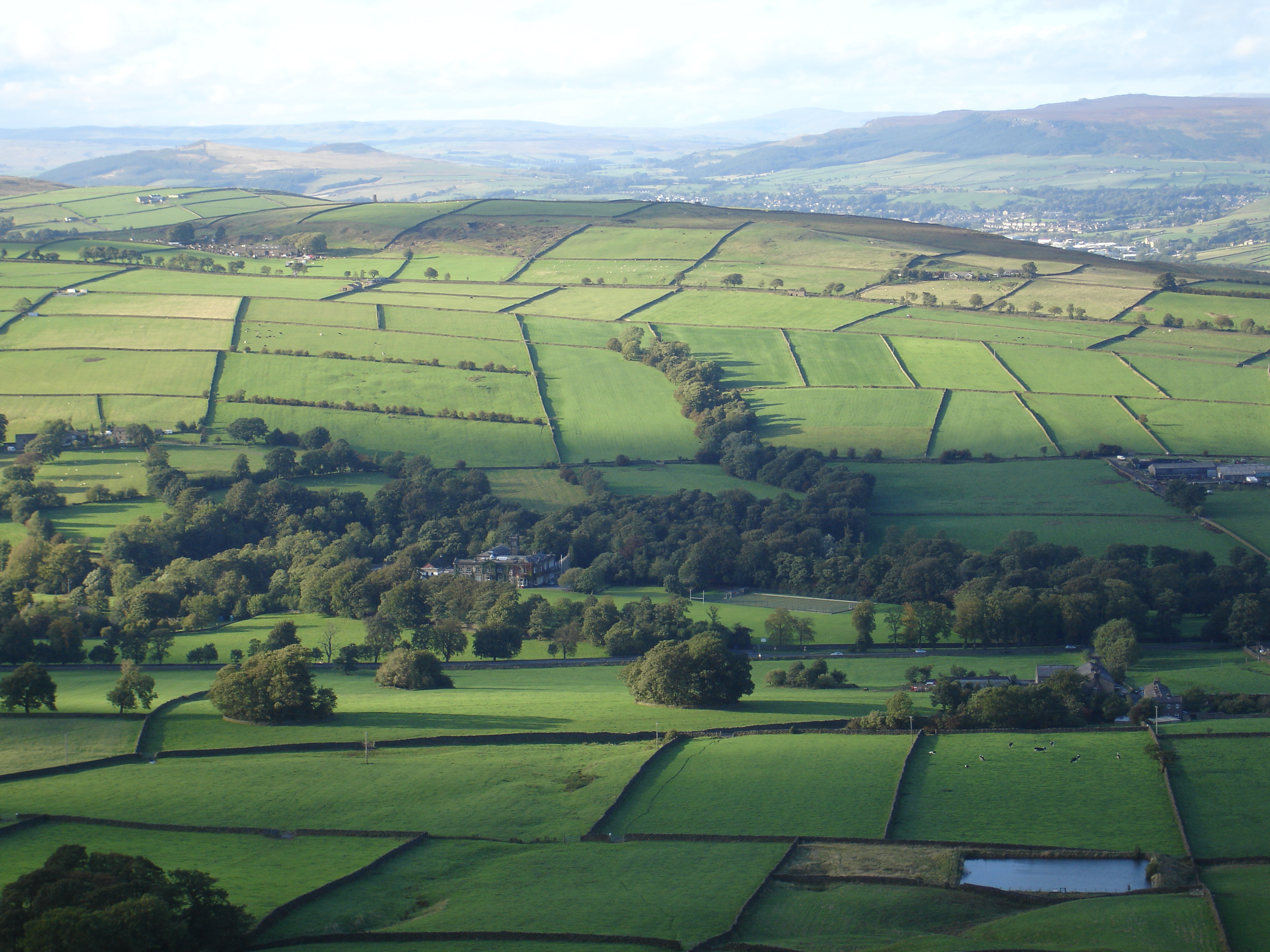
Malsis School surrounded by its grounds in North Yorkshire
