= Malsis Hall =

Building in North Yorkshire, England

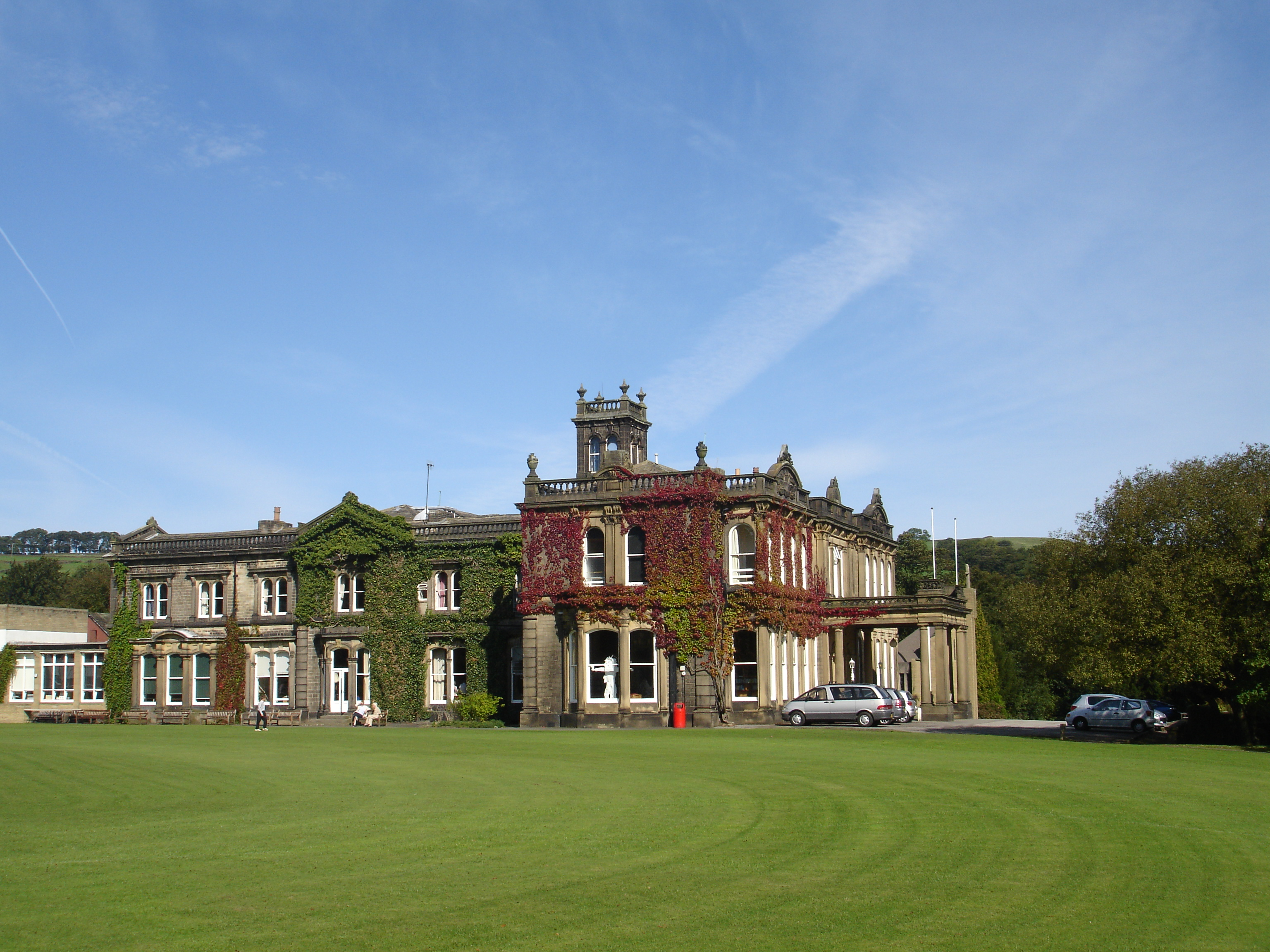
- Malsis Hall, 2006

- Location within North Yorkshire
- 53°53′49″N 2°01′03″W
- Location: Glusburn and Cross Hills
- OS grid reference: SD 98946 44540

History
- Built: 1862-1866

Site notes
- Area: Keighley
- Architect: Samuel Jackson
- Architectural style: Italianate
- Owner: Enhanced Community Healthcare Options (ECHO) Group

Listed Building – Grade II
- Reference no.: 1301291

Malsis Hall is a mansion in Glusburn, North Yorkshire, England. It was built in the 1860s by Bradford-based architect Samuel Jackson for the Keighley-based textile magnate James Lund. It is a grade II listed building.

Since 2019 Malsis Hall has been operated by Enhanced Community Homes Options (ECHO) as a specialist residential care home for people with complex mental health conditions.

== History ==
=== Medieval manor ===
A private estate has existed at Malsis from the medieval period. In 1340 the Copley family of Batley, West Yorkshire acquired the manors of Malsis and Sutton and built a substantial residence on their new estate. Although their main seat was Batley Hall, members of the family would reside at Malsis for the next three centuries.

The 14th century hall survived until the 1540s, when it was burned down amid civil unrest linked to resistance against the enclosure of common fields.

=== Tudor manor ===
Following the destruction of the medieval hall, a new residence at Malsis was commissioned by Alvery Copley (c.1528-1598), which was completed on the same site in about 1550, presumably in the then prevalent Elizabethan style. The rebuilt manor would remain in possession of the Copley family for around another 70 years.

In 1621 Alvery Copley's grandson, also called Alvery (1586–1631), sold Malsis Hall to Richard Horsfall (c.1580-1644). However, the fortunes of the Horsfall family would turn during the English Civil War, when they sided with the Royalist cause. When the victorious Parliamentarian established the Commonwealth in 1649 following the execution of King Charles I, heavy financial penalties were imposed upon many prominent Royalist estates, including that of the Horsfall family. To raise funds, Malsis Hall and its estate were let to tenants, among whom were the Spencer family.

Only in 1781 was Malsis Hall was put up for sale by the decedents of Richard Horsfall, when it was described as a mansion house with offices, stables and outbuildings. The sale included 300 acres of land and three farmhouses. It was eventually bought by William Spencer (1739–1793) in 1786, a gentleman whose family was originally from Silsden, but who may have already been acting as steward of the estate.

=== Victorian mansion ===
In 1852, Keithley based industrialist James Lund (1829–1903) married William Spencer's great-granddaughter, Mary Spencer (1826–1865). Lund was the heir to his father William Lund's (1789–1861) worsted manufacturing fortune and, on receipt of his inheritance in 1861, he acquired Malsis Hall and its estate from his father-in-law - also William Spencer (1799–1876). Described at the time as being in a dilapidated state, Lund immediately had the Tudor manor house demolished, preserving only the carved coats of arms and an inscription bearing the words "Avery Copley built this house", which would be incorporated into the new building.

Lund commissioned a new mansion befitting of his wealth and status from the Bradford based architect Samuel Jackson (1830–1910). Erected in a new position within the estate, this third iteration of Malsis Hall was completed in 1866, a year after Mary's premature death aged 39. Jackson's Italianate style design is constructed of stone with angle pilasters, an entablature, a pierced arcaded parapet with urns, and a slate roof. There are two storeys, and an entrance front of twelve bays, with a porte cochère. Most of the windows have two lights, and cornices on consoles, those in the upper floor with round heads, and those in the ground floor with segmental heads. In the centre is a belvedere tower. Among the artisans who worked on the hall's decoration was Arthur Greenwood, responsible for much of the interior plasterwork. Greenwood was the first of four generations of his family whose craft has been employed to maintain the building in an unbroken line up to the present day.

== Malsis School ==
Upon James Lund's death in 1903, Malsis Hall passed to his son Reginald Lund (1870–1950) who, in 1919, sold the estate to Sir John Horsfall of Hayfield, Glusburn - likely a descendent of Richard Horsfall, who had himself purchased the estate in the 17th century. Horsfall promptly let the property to the newly formed Malsis School – which eventually bought the hall and grounds outright.

Founded by Albert Henry Montagu as an independent school for boys, Malsis School opened on 14 May 1920, centered on the hall and making use of 40 acres of landscaped grounds. Montagu would serve as the school's headmaster until 1937. Catering for children aged 3 to 13, Malsis School emphasised pre-preparatory and preparatory education aligned to Church of England principles, including religious instruction and moral development. Multiple former staff members have been convicted of historical sexual offences committed against pupils at the school between the 1970s and 1990s

In 1998, Malsis School became co-educational, admitting girls for the first time in its history. However, this change could not arrest a decline in student numbers beginning in the early 21st century, which resulted in the school falling into financial difficulties. Following the failure of a proposed merger with nearby Giggleswick School, the closure of Malsis School was announced in November 2014. The school's last day of operation was 10 December 2014, after which the school trust entered administration.

In response to the closure, the Old Malsis Association was formed in January 2015 by school alumni, with the intention of preserving the school's history, memories and archives.

=== Chapel ===
In 1966 a modernist war memorial chapel was built for the school adjacent to the Hall itself, designed by the architectural firm John Brunton Partnership. It is notable for the 17 narrow rectangular windows ranged along the north and south walls, filled with stained glass designed by John Piper and manufactured by Patrick Reyntiens. Installed between 1966 and 1967, their design is primarily abstract, comprising sharp-edged abstract forms in pale shades of grey, blue, green and yellow. Each window individually commemorates one of 16 former pupils and one master of Malsis School who were killed in action during the Second World War. On each is the name of the individual to whom the specific window is dedicated and the insignia of the branch of the armed forces in which he served.

== Present day ==
=== Care home ===
Following the closure of Malsis School, in November 2015 the estate was acquired by former pupils Jamie and Jonathan Seddon through their company Seddon Developments Ltd. Planning permission for conversion of Malsis Hall into a specialist mental health rehabilitation facility was approved in 2018. In line with Malsis Hall's heritage listing, the principal architectural features of the 19th-century mansion, such as its stone facade and arcaded parapet, were preserved, while interiors were adapted for therapeutic use. The school chapel built in 1966 was also preserved.

Operated by Enhanced Community Homes Options (ECHO), Malsis Hall reopened in 2019 as a mental health care home with nursing, accommodating adults aged 18 and over with complex conditions, emphasizing recovery and independence.

== See also ==
- Listed buildings in Glusburn and Cross Hills
