= Glusburn Old Hall =

Historic english building

Coordinates: 53°53′56″N 2°00′18″W

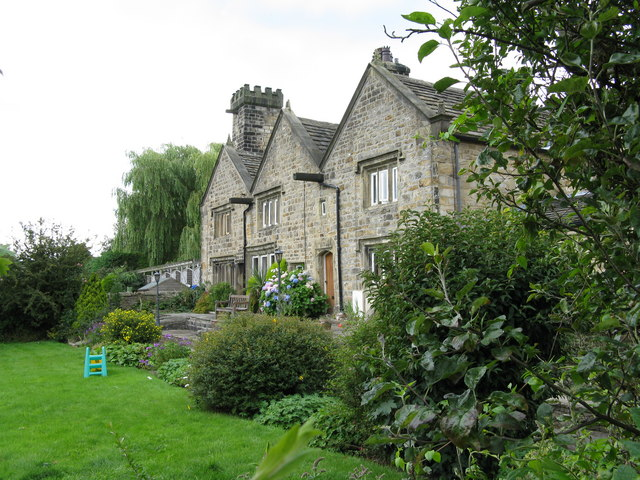
The building, in 2009

Glusburn Old Hall is a historic building in Glusburn, a village in North Yorkshire, in England.

The hall originated as the local manor house, and was probably in existence by the 14th century. The current building probably dates from 1637, although the datestone has been incorrectly recut to read "1537". In the 19th century, the doorways were altered, and an extension was added to the right-hand wing, which became used as a barn. By 1891, the house had been converted into farm cottages, but it was later recombined as a single large house. The building was grade II listed in 1954.

The house is built of stone with a stone slate roof, coped gables, kneelers and apex finials. It has two storeys, an entrance front with three wide gabled bays, and a rear wing on the right. The middle doorway has initials and re-cut date in the spandrels, and to the left is an embattled turret. Most of the windows are mullioned with hood moulds, and some mullions are missing. There are two chimneys. The interior has been completely altered.

== See also ==
- Listed buildings in Glusburn and Cross Hills
