= Listed buildings in Glusburn and Cross Hills =

Glusburn and Cross Hills is a civil parish in the county of North Yorkshire, England. It contains 16 listed buildings that are recorded in the National Heritage List for England. All the listed buildings are designated at Grade II, the lowest of the three grades, which is applied to "buildings of national importance and special interest". The parish contains the villages of Glusburn and Cross Hills and the surrounding countryside. Most of the listed buildings are houses, cottages and associated structures, farmhouses and farm buildings. The others include a public house, a boundary stone, a milestone and a village institute.

== Buildings ==
Name and location	Photograph	Date	Notes
Glusburn Old Hall; 53.89882°N 2.00498°W		Early 17th century (probable)	A large house in stone with a stone slate roof, coped gables, kneelers and apex finials. There are two storeys, an entrance front with three wide gabled bays, and a rear wing on the right. The middle doorway has initials and re-cut date in the spandrels, and to the left is an embattled turret. Most of the windows are mullioned with hood moulds, and some mullions are missing.
West Close Farm Farmhouse; 53.90026°N 2.02229°W	—	Late 17th century	The farmhouse is in stone with a stone slate roof. There are two storeys, three bays, a single-bay cottage on the right, and a rear outshut. The doorway has a stone hood on consoles. The windows are double-chamfered and mullioned, those in the upper floor with hood moulds.
Harrison Place; 53.89898°N 2.00353°W	—	Late 17th or early 18th century	A house, later divided into two, in stone with a stone slate roof. There are two storeys and three bays. In the ground floor are chamfered mullioned windows with some mullions missing, and the upper floor contains single-light windows. In the right return is a former doorway with a chamfered surround and a triangular head.
1 and 3 Keighley Road, Cross Hills; 53.90200°N 1.98979°W		1733	A pair of rendered houses with stone dressings, quoins, and a stone slate roof. There are two storeys and three bays. On the front are two doorways with fanlights, the left with a plain surround and the right with alternate-blocked jambs. The windows are modern, and the date is on the chimney.
Old White Bear Hotel; 53.90157°N 1.98735°W		1735	The inn is in stone with a stone slate roof, two storeys and three bays. The doorway has a hood mould, and above it is a dated and inscribed plaque. To the right is a doorway with a triangular head that has been converted into a window. Some windows are mullioned with some mullions missing, and others are modern. At the rear is a round-headed doorway with impost blocks and a keystone. On the right are ancillary buildings with an external staircase.
The Cottage; 53.90211°N 1.99029°W	—	Mid 18th century	The house is in stone with a stone slate roof, two storeys and five bays. On the front are two blocked doorways with decorated lintels, and the windows are recessed and mullioned.
Ryecroft Farm Farmhouse; 53.90190°N 2.00229°W	—	1752	The farmhouse is in stone with a stone slate roof. There are two storeys and a long front. On the front are three doorways, the outer ones with plain surrounds, and the middle one with a chamfered surround and a massive lintel. The windows are mullioned, with some mullions missing.
Fernbank; 53.90211°N 1.99009°W		Late 18th century	The house is in stone, with chamfered rusticated quoins, bracketed eaves and a stone slate roof. There are two storeys and three bays. The central doorway has engaged Ionic columns, an entablature, a round-arched fanlight with a keystone, and a pediment. The windows are sashes, there is a small window in the gable, and at the rear is a large stair window.
Former Barclays Bank; 53.90192°N 1.99026°W		Early 19th century	A house, at one time a bank, and later used for other purposes, in stone, with bracketed eaves, and a hipped green slate roof. There are two storeys, three bays, and a rear service wing. The central doorcase has three-quarter Tuscan columns, an entablature and an open pediment, and a round-headed doorway with a fanlight and a keystone. Most of the windows are sashes, and in the service wing is a three-light chamfered mullioned window.
Boundary stone 53.89736°N 2.00975°W		Mid 19th century (probable)	The boundary stone is on the northeast side of Colne Road (A6068 road). It has a double-rounded top and a line scored down the middle. On each side of the line are inscriptions.
Grotto; 53.90184°N 1.99044°W	—	19th century (probable)	The grotto is in the garden of the former Barclays Bank. It consists of an arch and a retaining wall formed of minerals.
Milestone; 53.89874°N 2.00231°W		19th century	The milestone on the south side of Colne Road (A6068 road) is in iron, and has a triangular plan and a round head. On the head is inscribed "Blackburn Addingham and Cocking End Road" and "Glusburn", on the left side are the distances to Colne and Burnley, and on the right side the distances to Keighley, Addingham and Ilkley.
Malsis Hall; 53.89707°N 2.01756°W		1866	A large house that was later extended, and subsequently converted into a school and, latterly, a care home. It is in stone with angle pilasters, an entablature, a pierced arcaded parapet with urns, and a slate roof, and is in Italianate style. There are two storeys, and an entrance front of twelve bays, with a porte cochère. Most of the windows have two lights, and cornices on consoles, those in the upper floor with round heads, and those in the ground floor with segmental heads. In the centre is a belvedere tower.
Gatepiers and railings, Malsis Hall; 53.89679°N 2.01100°W	—	c. 1866	At the entrance to the drive are four square stone gate piers with alternating rustication and caps with segmental pediments on each side, two with carved floral sprays. Between the outer pairs of piers are low stone walls with simple railings.
Lodge to Malsis Hall; 53.89690°N 2.01090°W		c. 1866	The lodge is in stone on a plinth, with rusticated pilaster strips at the corners, modillion eaves, and a slate roof, the gables treated as open pediments. There is a single storey and an L-shaped plan, and it is in Italianate style. The doorway has a round-arched head, and the windows are paired sashes with moulded archivolts.
Glusburn Institute and wall 53.89939°N 1.99953°W		1892	A clock tower was added to the institute in 1911. The building is in stone with a pierced arcaded parapet, turrets, and a green slate roof. There are two storeys and four irregular bays. On the left corner is an open turret with a stone cap and a ball finial, which is corbelled out above a panel with a florid achievement. The second bay forms a three-storey bay window, and the clock tower in the third bay has a stone dome and four domed pinnacles. Most of the windows are mullioned and transomed, and attached to the building is a low stone wall with domed piers and iron railings.
