= Earl Crag =

Climbing areas of England

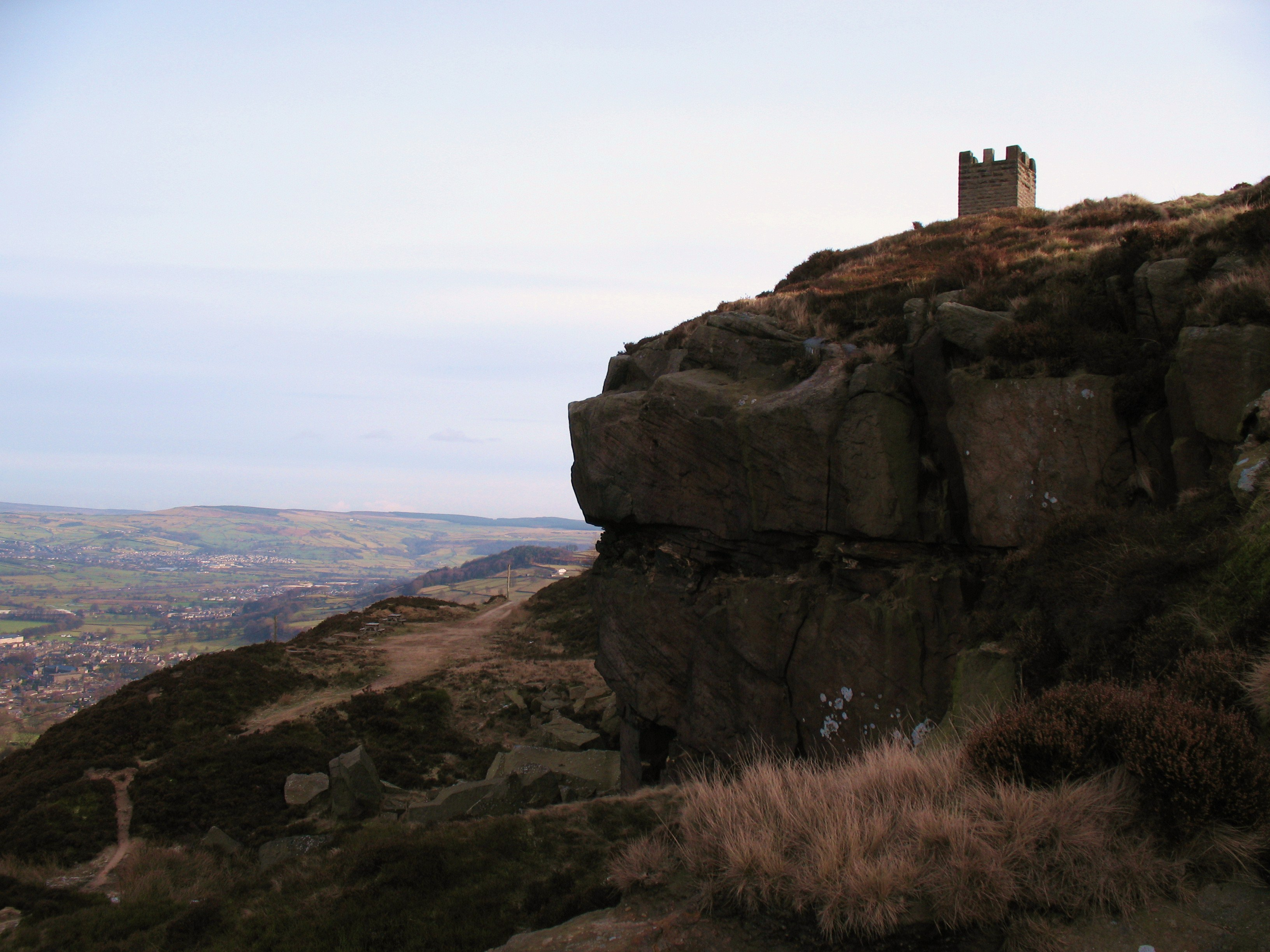
- Earl Crag with Lund’s Tower and an old gritstone quarry in view
- Interactive map of Earl Crag
- Location: North Yorkshire
- Nearest city: Bradford
- Coordinates: 53°52′57″N 2°01′24″W
- Rock type: Gritstone
- Ownership: Private

Earl Crag is a gritstone crag and climbing area in Craven, North Yorkshire, England. It is home to Lund's Tower, Wainman's Pinnacle, and The Hitching Stone, all of which are near Cowling.

== Climbing ==
Earl Crag itself is popular for climbing and has many different possible routes and climbing techniques.

=== The Hitching Stone ===
Some people climb The Hitching Stone, which is an old gritstone erratic nearby Earl Crag.

== History ==
=== Architecture ===
==== Lund’s Tower ====
Lund's Tower, also known as Sutton Pinnacle, was built by James Lund on Earl Crag in 1887 and designed by R. B. Broster & Sons.

==== Wainman’s Pinnacle ====
Wainman's Pinnacle, also known as Cowling Pinnacle, was built on Earl Crag in 1898 as a memorial to the Napoleonic Wars by a man known as Wainman, and was rebuilt by other locals in 1900 following a lightning strike. Wainman's Pinnacle and Earl Crag can be seen from many towns and villages in the area.

== Gallery ==
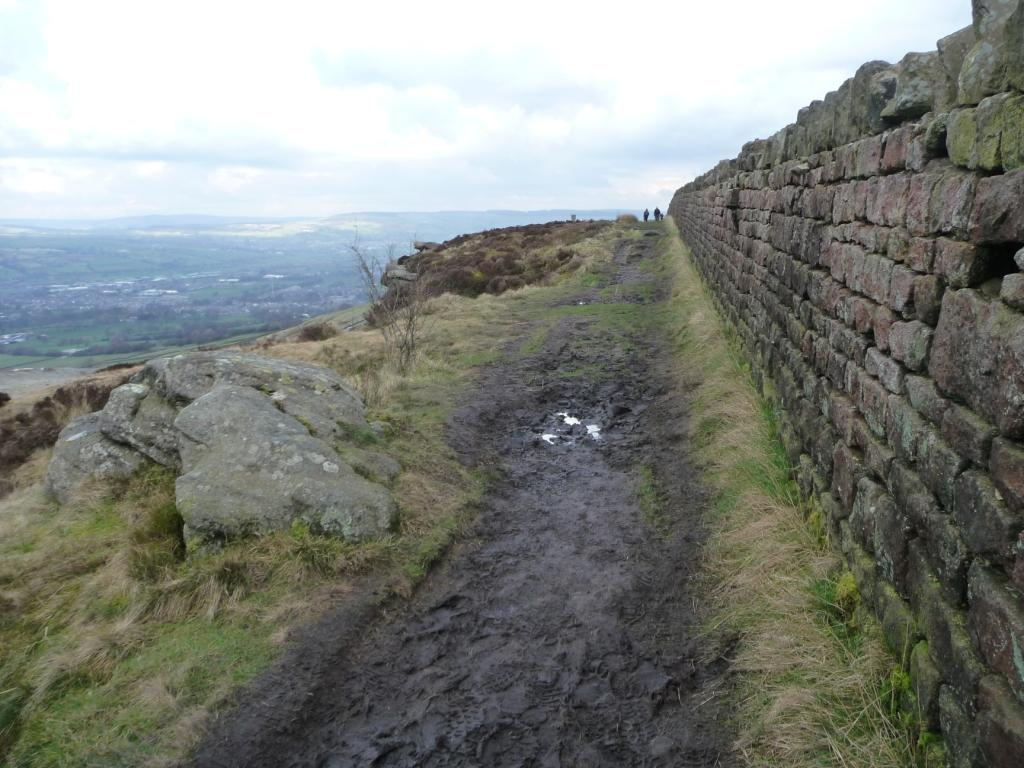
A path along the top edge of Earl Crag

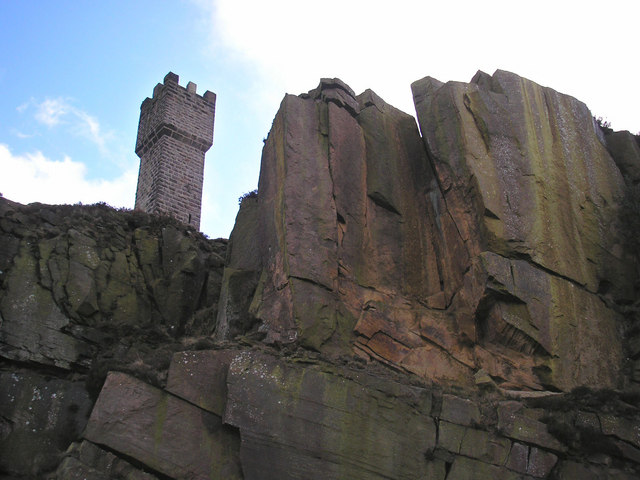
Earl Crag and Lund's Tower

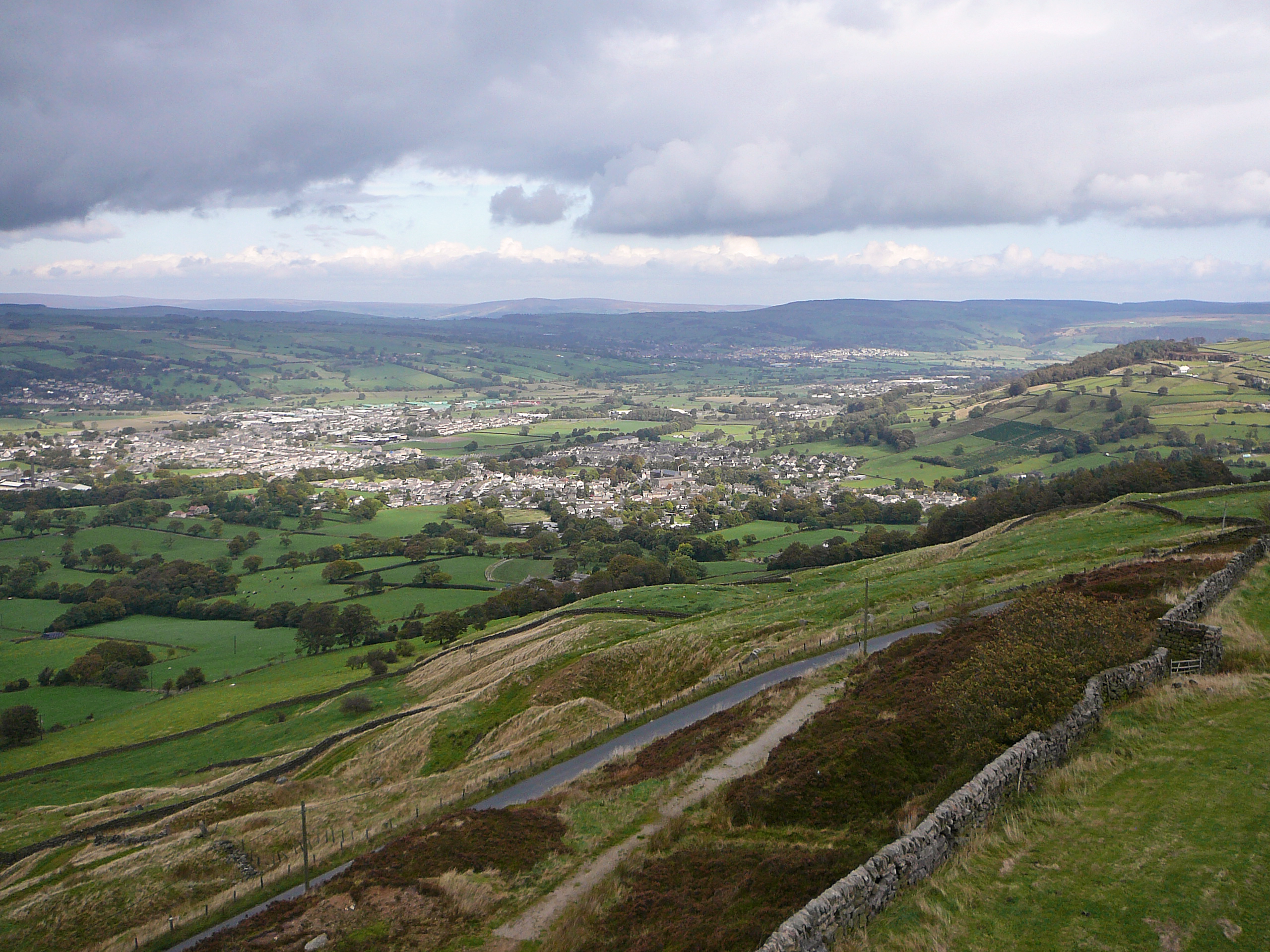
A view of Sutton-in-Craven from Earl Crag

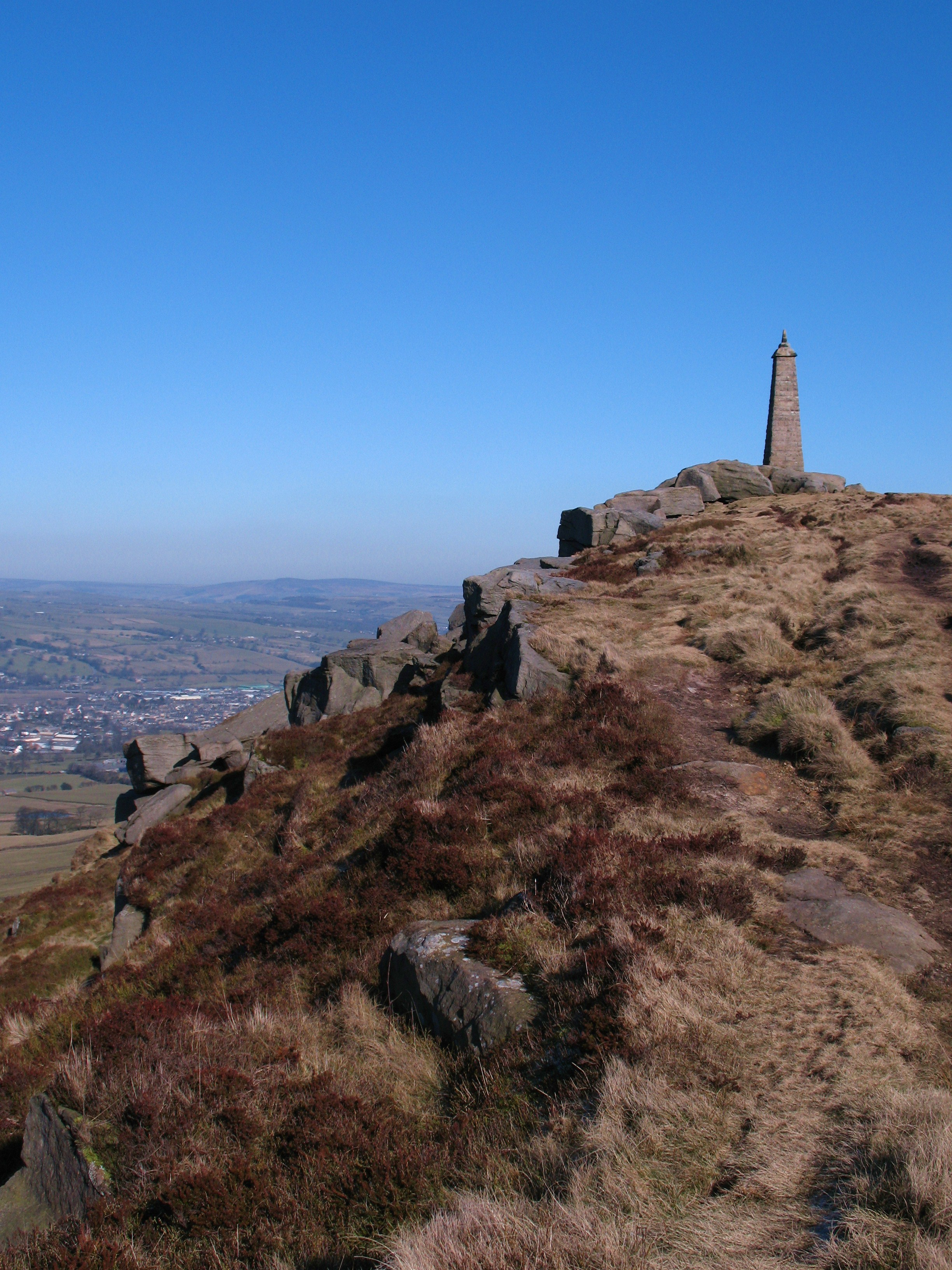
Wainman's Pinnacle, a stone obelisk on Earl Crag

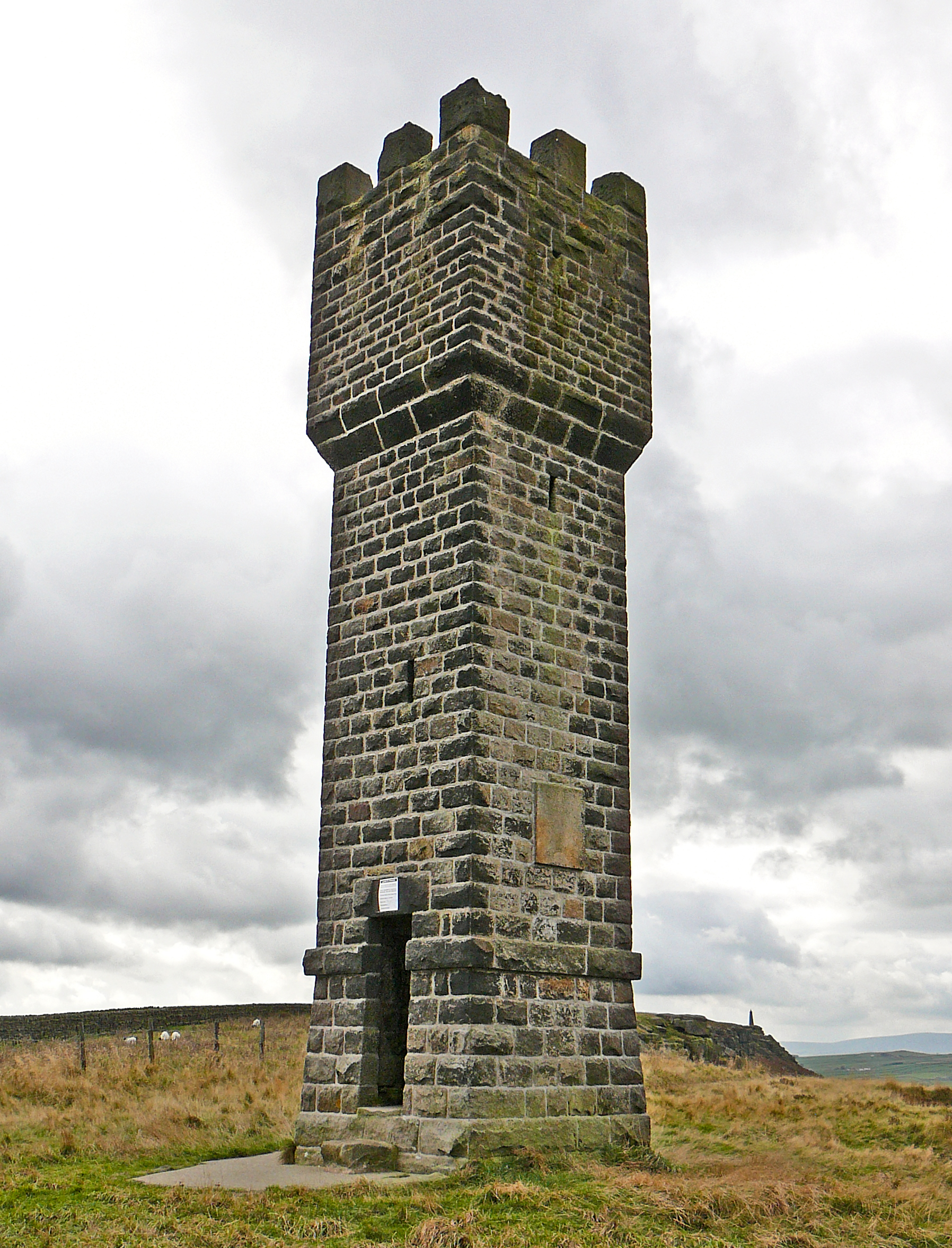
Lund's Tower on Earl Crag
