= Glusburn =

Village in North Yorkshire, England

Coordinates: 53°53′58″N 2°00′04″W

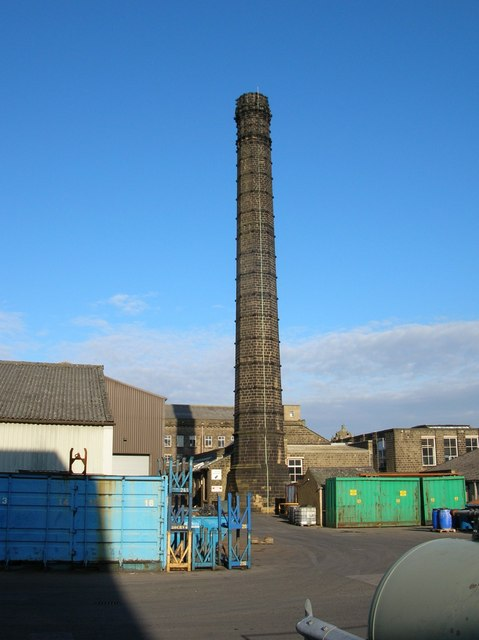
- Chimney at Glusburn Mill

- Location within North Yorkshire
- Population: 3,980 (2011 census)
  - London: 180 mi (290 km) SE
- Civil parish: Glusburn and Cross Hills
- Unitary authority: North Yorkshire
- Ceremonial county: North Yorkshire
- Region: Yorkshire and the Humber
- Country: England
- Sovereign state: United Kingdom
- Post town: KEIGHLEY
- Postcode district: BD20
- Dialling code: 01535
- Police: North Yorkshire
- Fire: North Yorkshire
- Ambulance: Yorkshire
- UK Parliament: Skipton and Ripon

Glusburn is a village and electoral ward in the county of North Yorkshire, England. The village is situated on the edge of the Yorkshire Dales, sits on the A6068 Kildwick to Hapton road, and is conjoined to the village of Sutton-in-Craven at the south.

The village is the older part of the civil parish of Glusburn and Cross Hills, historically known as Glusburn. The newer part of the parish is known as Cross Hills. The parish had a population of 3,902, increasing to 3,980 at the 2011 Census.

Until 1974 it was part of the West Riding of Yorkshire. From 1974 to 2023 it was part of the Craven District, it is now administered by the unitary North Yorkshire Council.

== History ==
The village most likely dates back to the 8th century. The site on which Glusburn is situated on is just above Glus Beck, which means the 'shining stream'. The site would have been rough uncultivated land, moorland and forest, with wolves, wild boar and deer around at the time.

Before 1066, most of the area was held by Earl Edwin, a Saxon nobleman. However he broke his oath of loyalty to King William I and consequently the king took the land as revenge. Therefore in the Domesday Book, the site is described as "Terra Regis" or 'Lands of the King'. Another part of the Domesday Book, folio 327r, records that in Glusebrun and Chelchis were c. 360 acres (c. 150 hectares) of ploughland of which "Gamal Bern had them; Gilbert Tison has them". For in the Harrying of the North all lands were taken from Anglo-Scandinavians and given to Norman Lords.

In 1369, John Scarborough was Lord of the manor, and is believed to have lived at Glusburn Old Hall. In the 16th century, the estate was sold partly to John Currer of Kildwick Hall, but also to William Garforth of Steeton.

In 1379, it was recorded that 23 people in Glusburn paid a poll tax to Richard II. However in 1587, smallpox ravaged the village's population.

At the end of the 17th century, vestry rule came to Glusburn and it was put under the parish of Kildwick.

In 1700, most villagers were farmers, with spinning and weaving as a secondary income although some of the residents were listed as miners. A lead mining operation had been in operation on Glusburn Moor since the 16th century and was previously in the ownership of monks of Bolton Priory. During the latter part of the 18th century there were major improvements in the transport infrastructure. During the early 19th century, trade suffered and many people became destitute. In the census of 1851, Glusburn had 642 inhabitants and many were engaged in textile work, with farming as a secondary income. Likewise in 1891, the main occupation of the villagers was in the textile industry and the population was stated as being 1,942.

John William Hartley constructed a small weaving shed in Glusburn and a John Horsfall came over from Oxenhope to learn his trade with him. John Horsfall then married John William Hartley's daughter Grace in 1844 and at first became his partner and then the sole owner of the weaving shed. He was extremely successful and his business grew rapidly. He required more workers, which meant that additional terraced housing was built. The main building of the mill dates from this time, which at its peak employed 500 people.

John Horsfall went on to build Hayfield Hall, as well as the Glusburn Institute and a park across the road from the mill. Hayfield Hall, built prior to 1885, was a solid ten bedroom country house with a garden and a lake, the latter serving as a dam for the mill. John Cousin Horsfall was created 1st Baronet of Hayfield in 1909 and John Donald Horsfall, the 2nd Baronet, was High Sheriff of Yorkshire for 1927–28. After standing empty for some time, the hall was sold for £1,000 in 1938. During the Second World War it was used as an army barracks, but was demolished at the end of the war and the site used for a mill extension.

In the 1960s, there was a shortage of workers in the area, consequently the Horsfall family had to recruit girls from Malta with a hostel being built to house them. In 1972, the mill was bought by Sirdar Wools Ltd and operated until 1995; it was mainly concerned with dyeing knitting wools. But in 1995 it was closed down again until it was bought in 1997–98 by Ellison's Holdings plc, which produced circlips, rings and fasteners for the automotive industry and who had previously been based in nearby Harden. After that it was bought by an American company TransTechnology (GB) Ltd. Now it is owned by Cirteq (GB) Ltd.

== Transport ==
In 1773 the Leeds and Liverpool Canal was opened and then in 1786 the Keighley to Kendal turnpike road was opened. This was followed in 1823 by the Blackburn, Addingham, Cocking End Road. The improvements brought large numbers of people to the area and many more houses and workplaces were built. Six stagecoaches a day took advantage of these new roads. In 1847, Kildwick and Cross Hills railway station was opened, which had perhaps the greatest effect on the village and marked the end of the stagecoach era.

In 1905, Ezra Laycock bought the first bus in the area, initially to help people from Cowling and Glusburn to get to Kildwick and Cross Hills railway station. This was the first omnibus service in the North of England. In 1924, the routes were taken over by Yorkshire Road Car Company and the Burnley, Colne & Nelson Joint Transport.

The former Keighley to Colne Turnpike road is now the busy A6069 road which suffers from traffic problems with heavy congestion and significant HGV usage. Buses serve the middle part of the village on a through route between Keighley and Skipton that travels through Sutton-in-Craven and Cross Hills. Another service goes over the Pennines to Colne and Burnley.

== See also ==
- Listed buildings in Glusburn and Cross Hills
