= Sutton-in-Craven =

Village and civil parish in North Yorkshire, England

Coordinates: 53°53′31″N 1°59′35″W

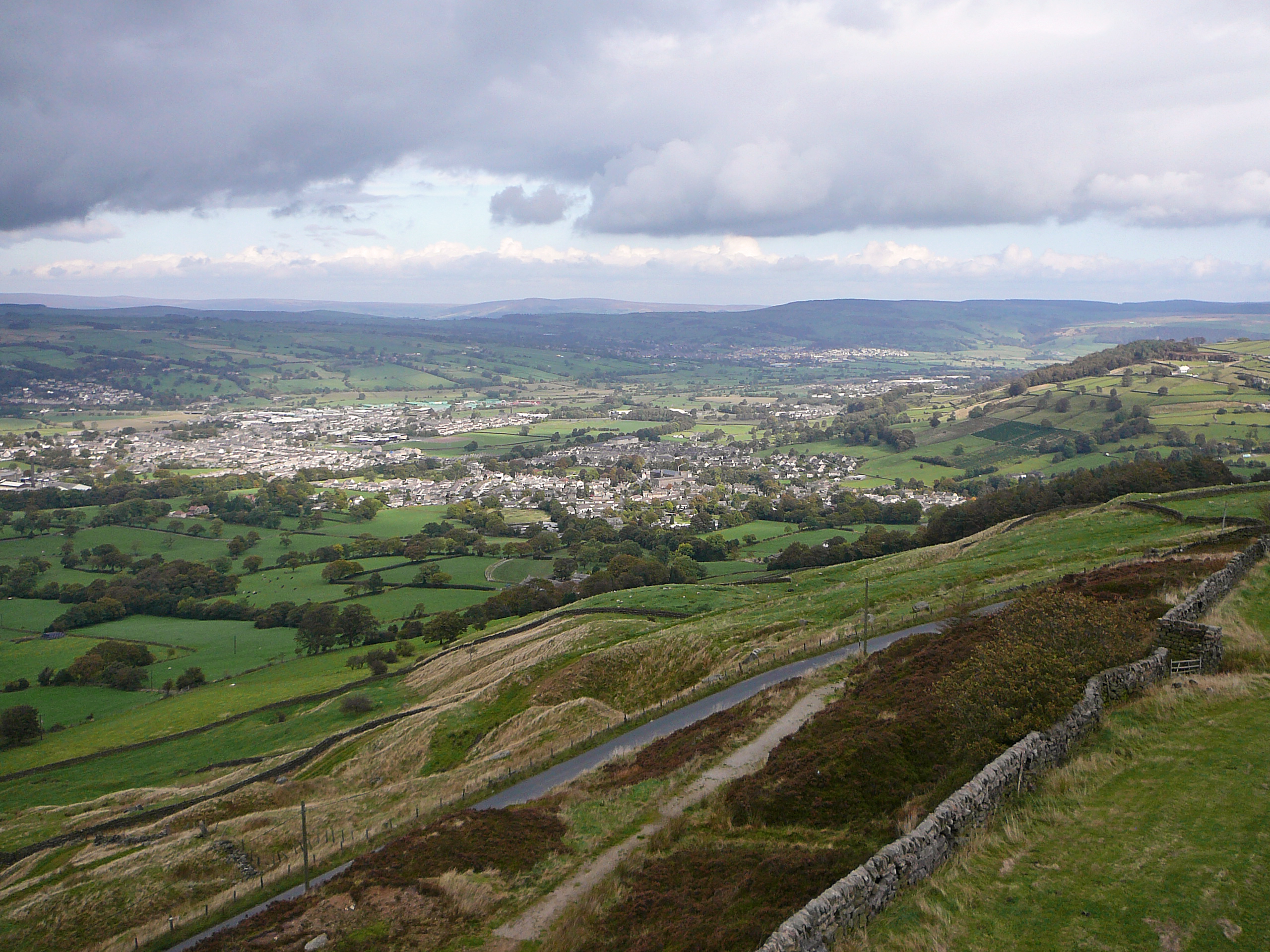
- View from Earl Crag

- Location within North Yorkshire
- Population: 3,714 (2011 census)
- OS grid reference: SE006441
  - London: 180 mi (290 km) SE
- Civil parish: Sutton
- Unitary authority: North Yorkshire
- Ceremonial county: North Yorkshire
- Region: Yorkshire and the Humber
- Country: England
- Sovereign state: United Kingdom
- Post town: KEIGHLEY
- Postcode district: BD20
- Dialling code: 01535
- Police: North Yorkshire
- Fire: North Yorkshire
- Ambulance: Yorkshire

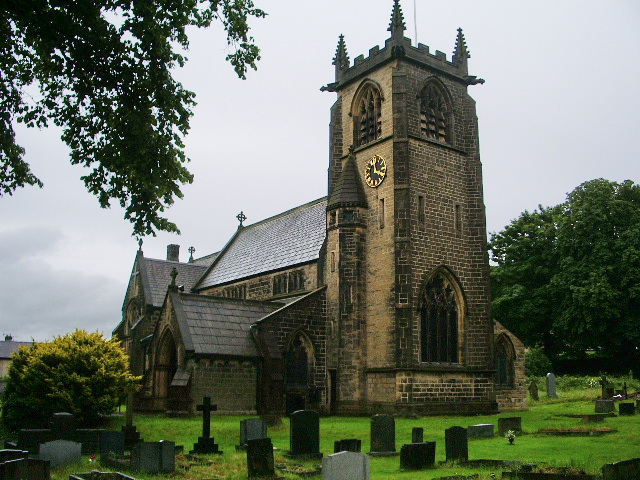
The parish church of St Thomas, Sutton-on-Craven, built 1868–69

Sutton-in-Craven is a village, electoral ward and (as just Sutton) a civil parish in the county of North Yorkshire, England that is situated in the Aire Valley between Skipton and Keighley. In 2001 the population was 3,480, increasing to 3,714 at the Census 2011. The village is adjacent to Glusburn and Cross Hills, but although these three effectively form a small town, Sutton village maintains its distinct identity.

Until 1974 it was part of the West Riding of Yorkshire. From 1974 to 2023 it was part of the Craven District, it is now administered by the unitary North Yorkshire Council.

== History ==
The village existed before 1086 as "Sutun": listed in the Domesday Book. The landowner then was Ravenkeld who was taxed on 240 acres (100 hectares) of ploughland. But lands were then given by the Norman crown to its compatriots: Robert de Romille followed by Edmund de Boyvill and then Adam de Copley.

In the 14th century, the village was known as Sutton-in-Ayrdale but became Sutton-in-Craven in 1620.

In the late 17th century Sutton-in-Craven became part of the ancient parish of Kildwick so all Sutton residents were baptised, married and buried at Kildwick Parish Church. But in 1869 Sutton was constituted as a separate ecclesiastical district. Building of St Thomas' Church, Sutton-in-Craven started in 1868 and its consecration day was the feast of St. Thomas, 21 December 1869.

Sutton-in-Craven Church of England Primary School opened in 1858.

=== Industry ===
The main industry was farming of livestock until the Industrial Revolution when that was largely replaced by the textile industry. One of the oldest mills, Greenroyd Mill at Sutton Clough, was in 1815 Peter Hartley's cotton mill but only the remains of its two dams are still visible. The 1831 Census lists numerous cotton weavers. The Bairstow family were woollen manufacturers from 1838 until 1970 but a nursing home and houses now stand on the site of their mill. Only one of the original mill buildings remains today.

=== Transport ===
In 1773 the first Bingley to Skipton section of the Leeds and Liverpool Canal passed 0.9 miles (1.4 km) to the north of Sutton. By 1781 the canal joined Leeds to Gargrave, and in 1816 completed the link to Liverpool.

In 1786 the Keighley and Kendal Turnpike road opened, followed in 1823 by the Blackburn to Addingham road, resulting in six stagecoaches a day passing through the area.

In 1847 the Leeds and Bradford Extension Railway opened its Shipley to Skipton section that passes 0.5 miles (0.8 km) to the north of Sutton at the Kildwick and Crosshills railway station.

== Landmarks ==
A park is opposite the Baptist Church behind the County Primary School. Sutton Clough, formerly part of the Sutton Hall Estate, is at the south of the village, and Lund's Tower and Wainman's Pinnacle are on a hill to the south-west. Craven House, the oldest village building, faces High Street and dates from the late 16th to early 17th centuries.

== People ==
The artist and scientific illustrator Brian Hargreaves (1935–2011) was born in Sutton.

== See also ==
- Listed buildings in Sutton, Craven

== Gallery ==
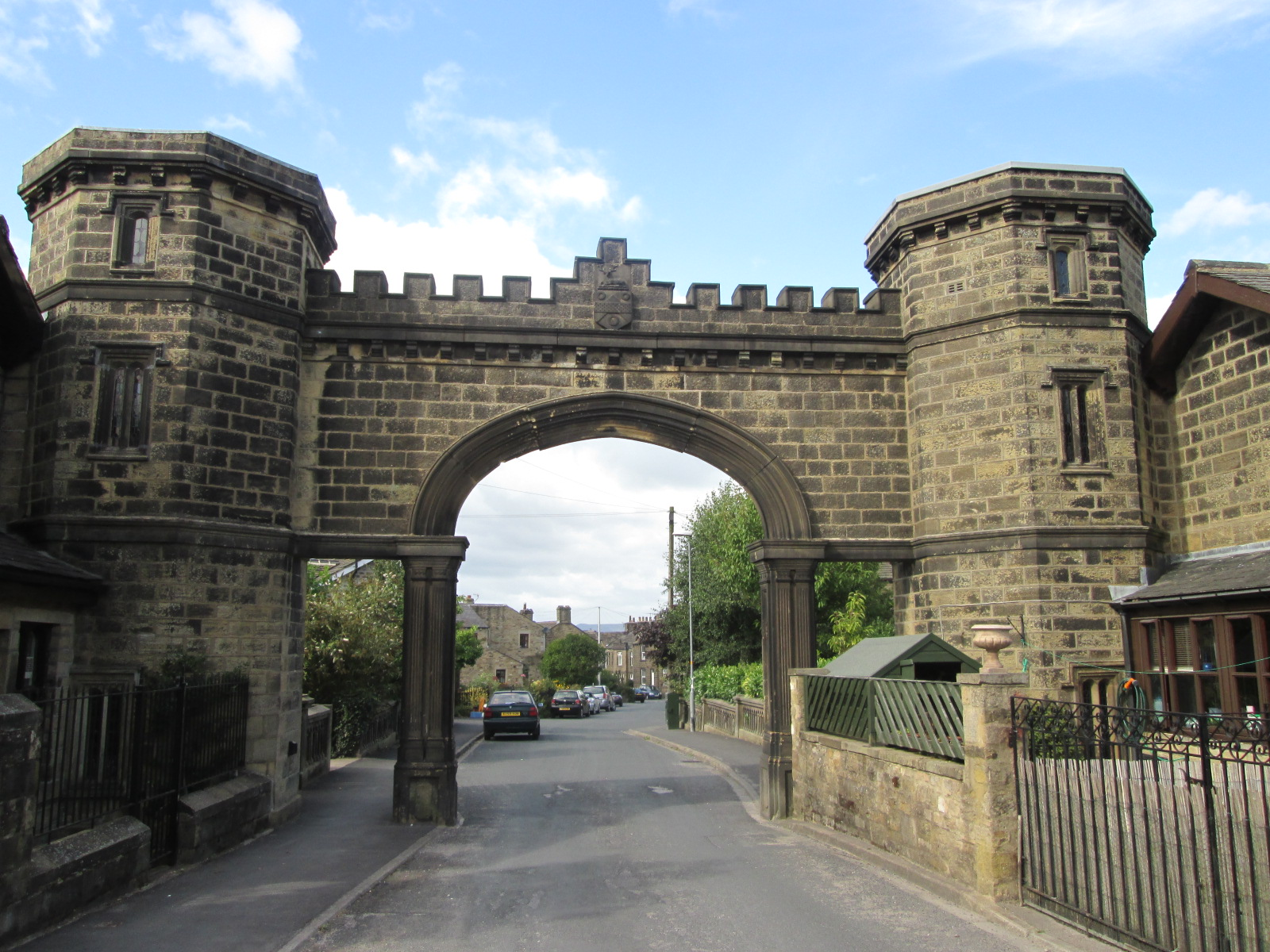
Gateway to 'The Clough'

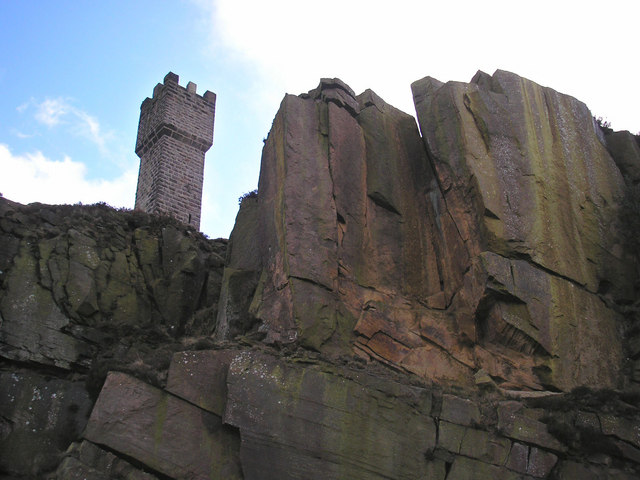
Lund's Tower on Earl Crag

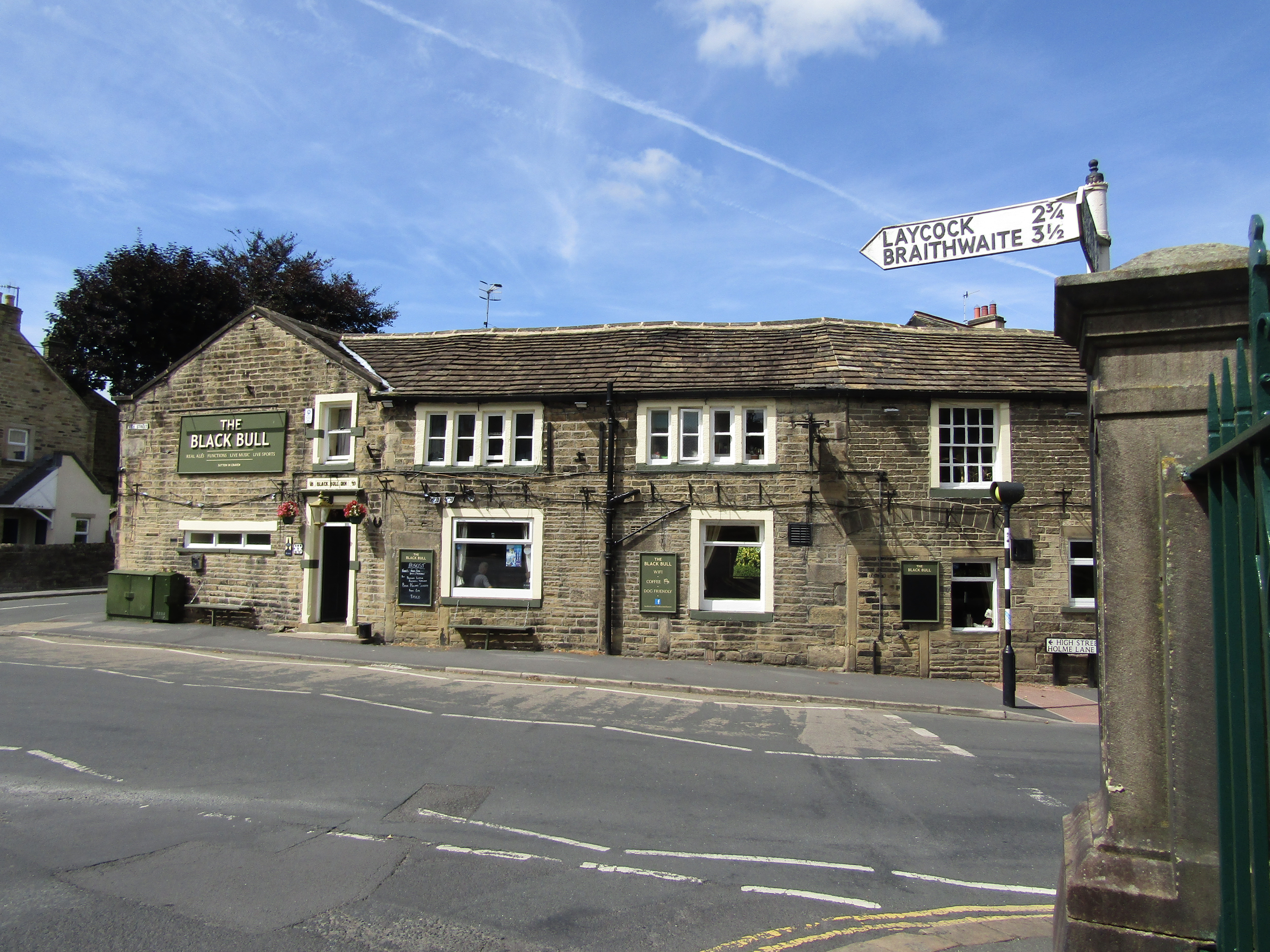
Black Bull Pub

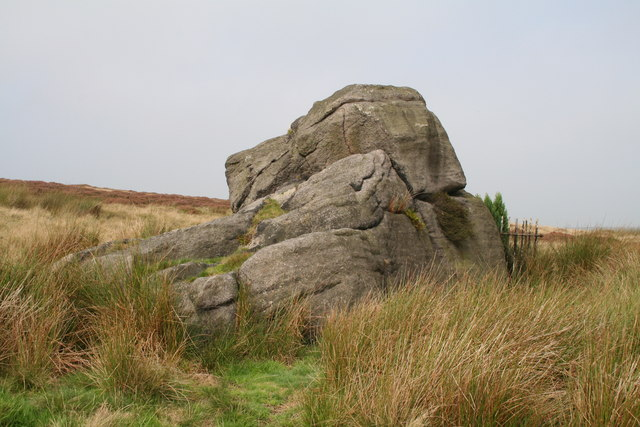
The Kid Stone

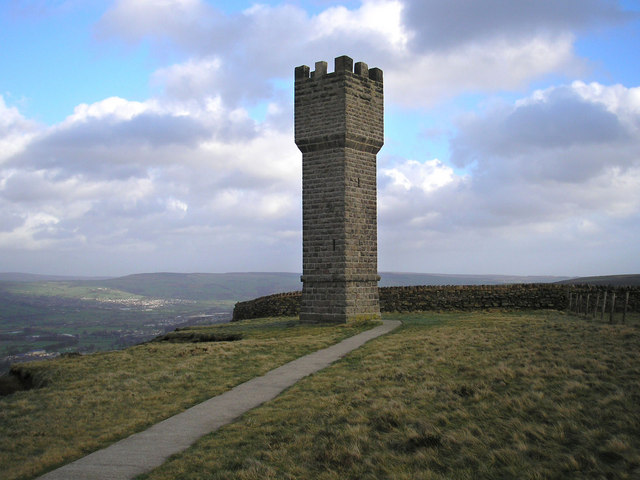
Lund's Tower

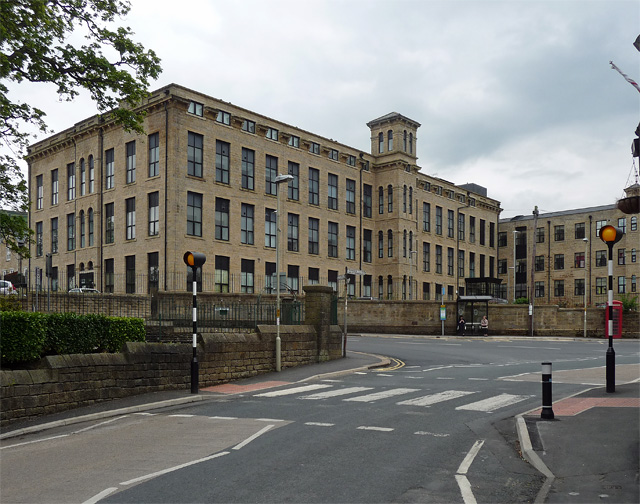
Greenroyd Mill

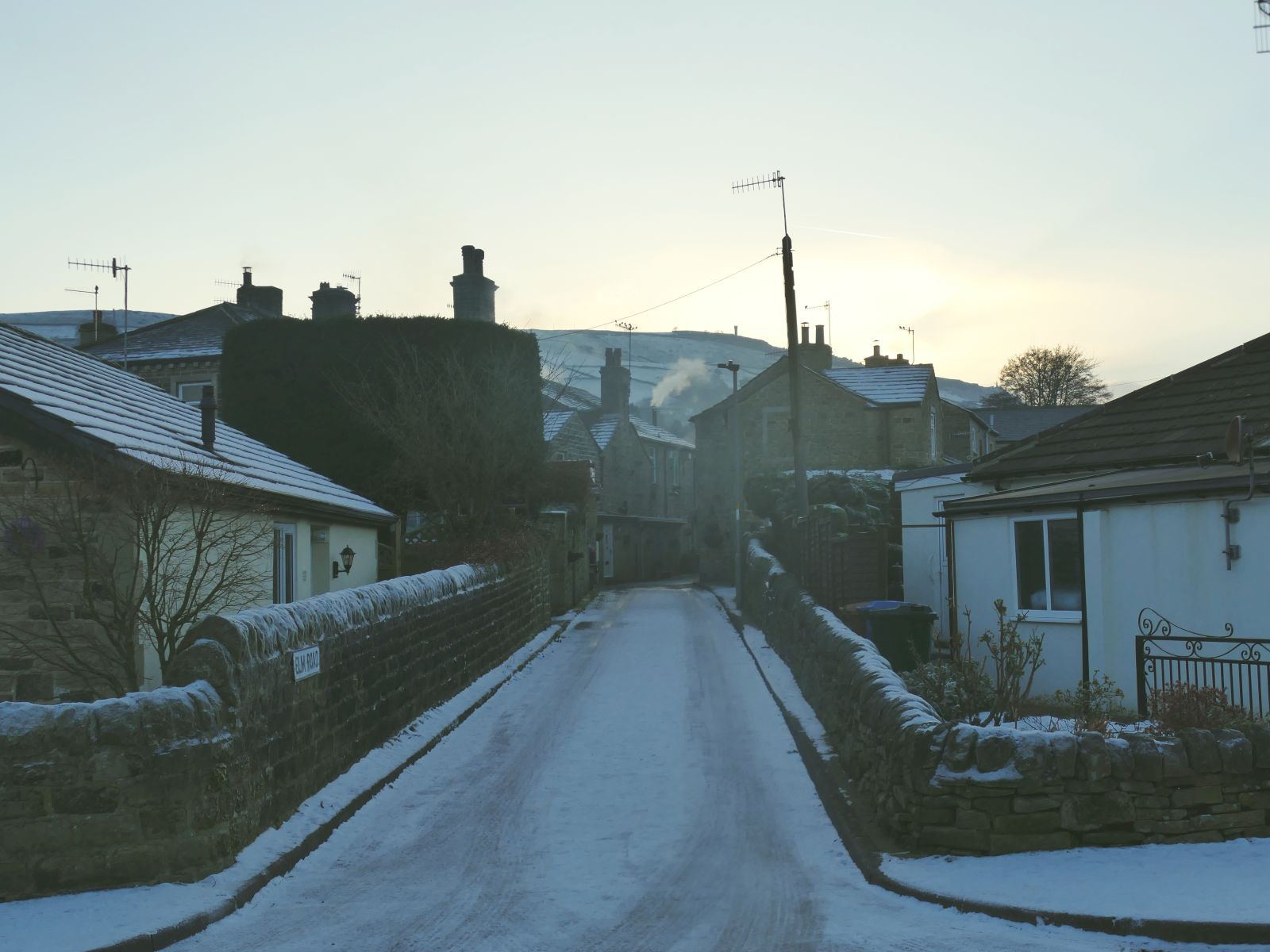
Elm Road taken from Ash Grove
