= Lund's Tower =

Nineteenth-century folly in Yorkshire

Coordinates: 53°53′02″N 2°00′48″W

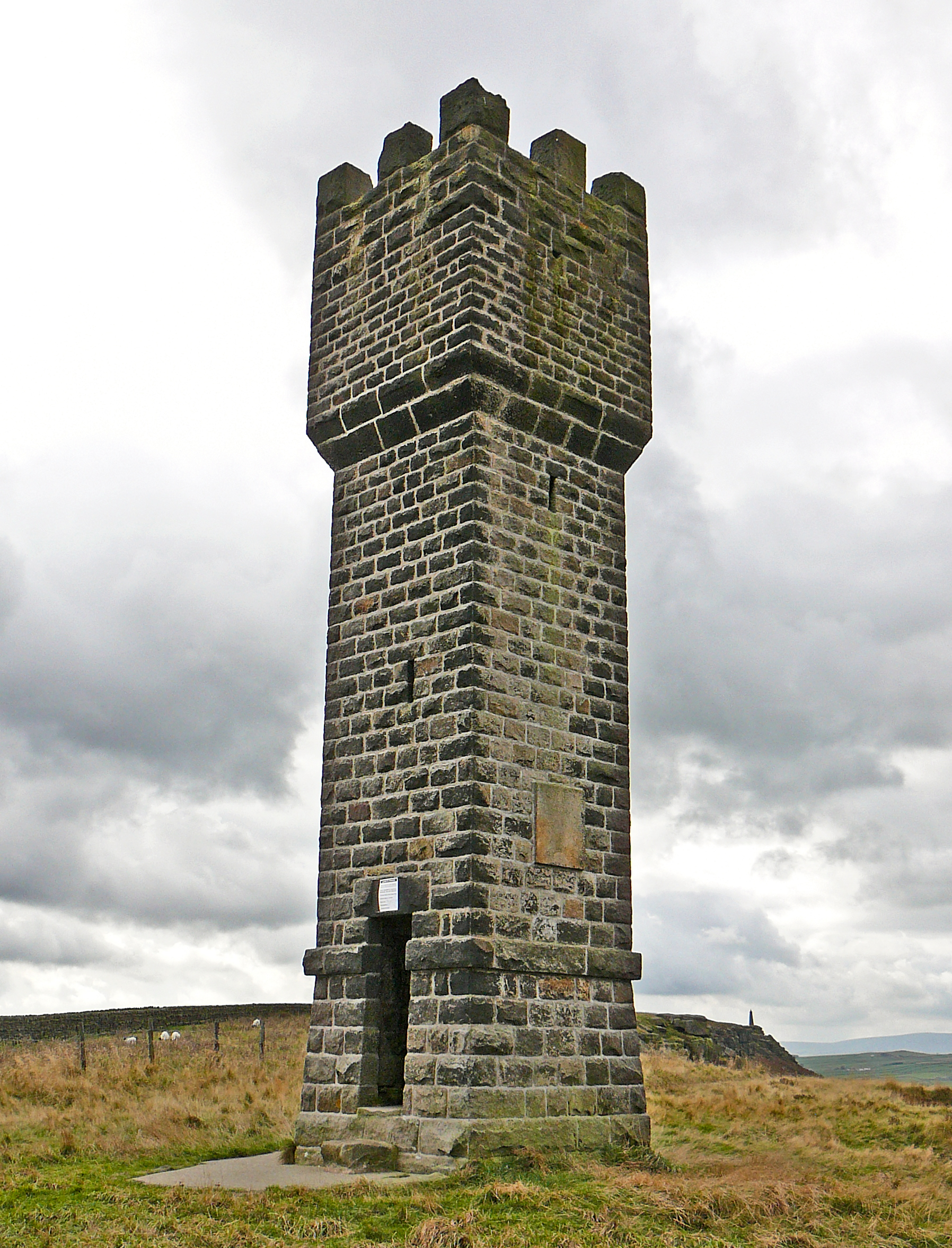
Lund's Tower

Lund's Tower is a stone-built folly situated to the south-west of the North Yorkshire village of Sutton-in-Craven. It is also known as Cowling Pinnacle, Sutton Pinnacle, the Ethel Tower, the Jubilee Tower or, in conjunction with the nearby Wainman's Pinnacle, the pair are referred to as the Salt and Pepper Pots.

It is listed in the National Heritage List for England at Grade II.

== History ==
James Lund (1829–1903) commissioned the Keighley architectural firm of R. B. Broster & Sons to design the tower, which was built in 1887. Different reasons have been given for why Lund wanted the folly built: local residents refer to it as the Ethel Tower, believing it was constructed either to celebrate the birth of Lund's daughter Ethel – or her 21st birthday; others refer to it as the Jubilee Tower, believing it commemorated the 1887 jubilee of Queen Victoria. It is also known as Sutton Pinnacle.

Lund was the son of William Lund, the owner of William Lund & Son, a large textile manufacturing business. In 1852, James Lund married Mary Sarah Spencer, the daughter of William Spencer, a wealthy landowner. The construction of Lund Mausoleum in Utley Cemetery, Keighley was also commissioned by Lund in 1895. Malsis Hall at Cross Hills and Ellerton Hall beside York were also owned by Lund. A new Malsis Hall was built by him in 1862 and became Malsis School in 1920. When Lund died in January 1903, his estate totalled £606,679, equivalent to about £62,468,366 as of 2012. (Note: Calculated using the Bank of England's UK price index.)

Set on the top of Earl Crag, Lund's Tower is in the same vicinity as Wainman's Pinnacle, which is also Grade II listed but constructed in 1898 to commemorate the Napoleonic Wars. The pair of monuments are known locally as the Salt and Pepper Pots.

The tower received Grade II listing in the National Heritage List for England in October 1984 under the designation number 1131781.

== Architecture ==
Crenellated battlements adorn the eleven-metre tall tower, which is constructed from squared-dressed stone. It has a plinth and an unreadable plaque. The interior has a stone built spiral staircase of thirty-nine steps. There is also a viewing platform.

== Gallery ==
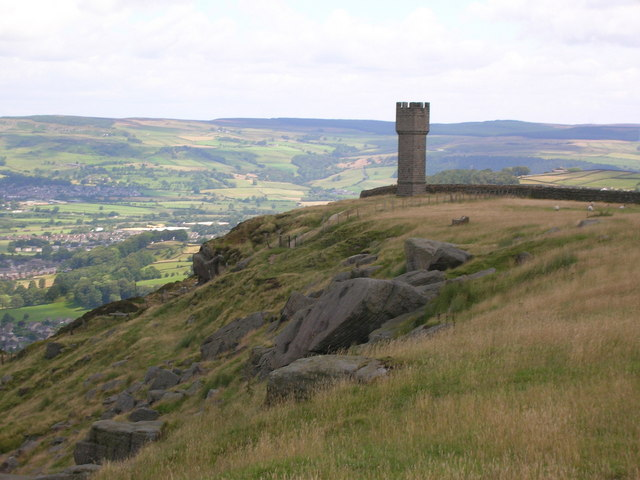

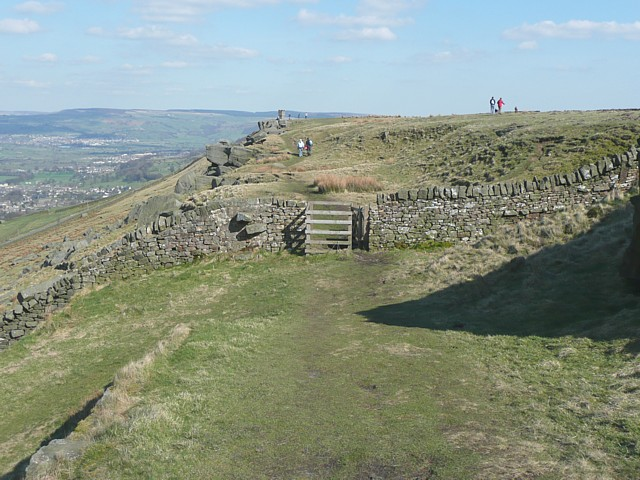

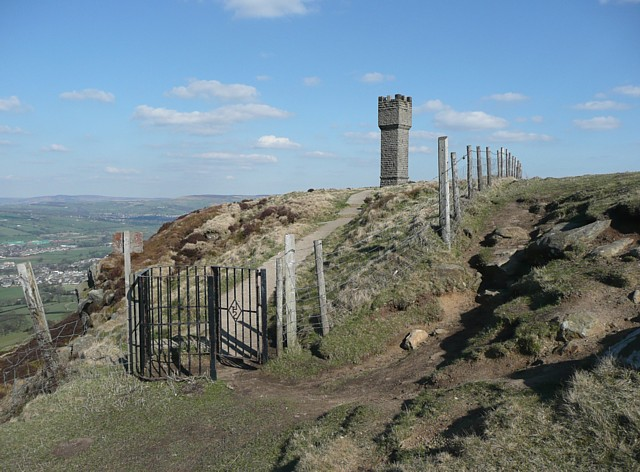

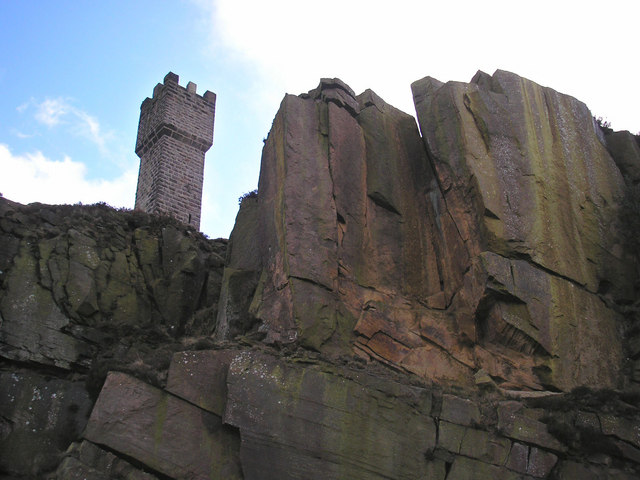
