= Wainman's Pinnacle =

Tower in Sutton, North Yorkshire, England

- Cowling Pinnacle; The Salt Pot
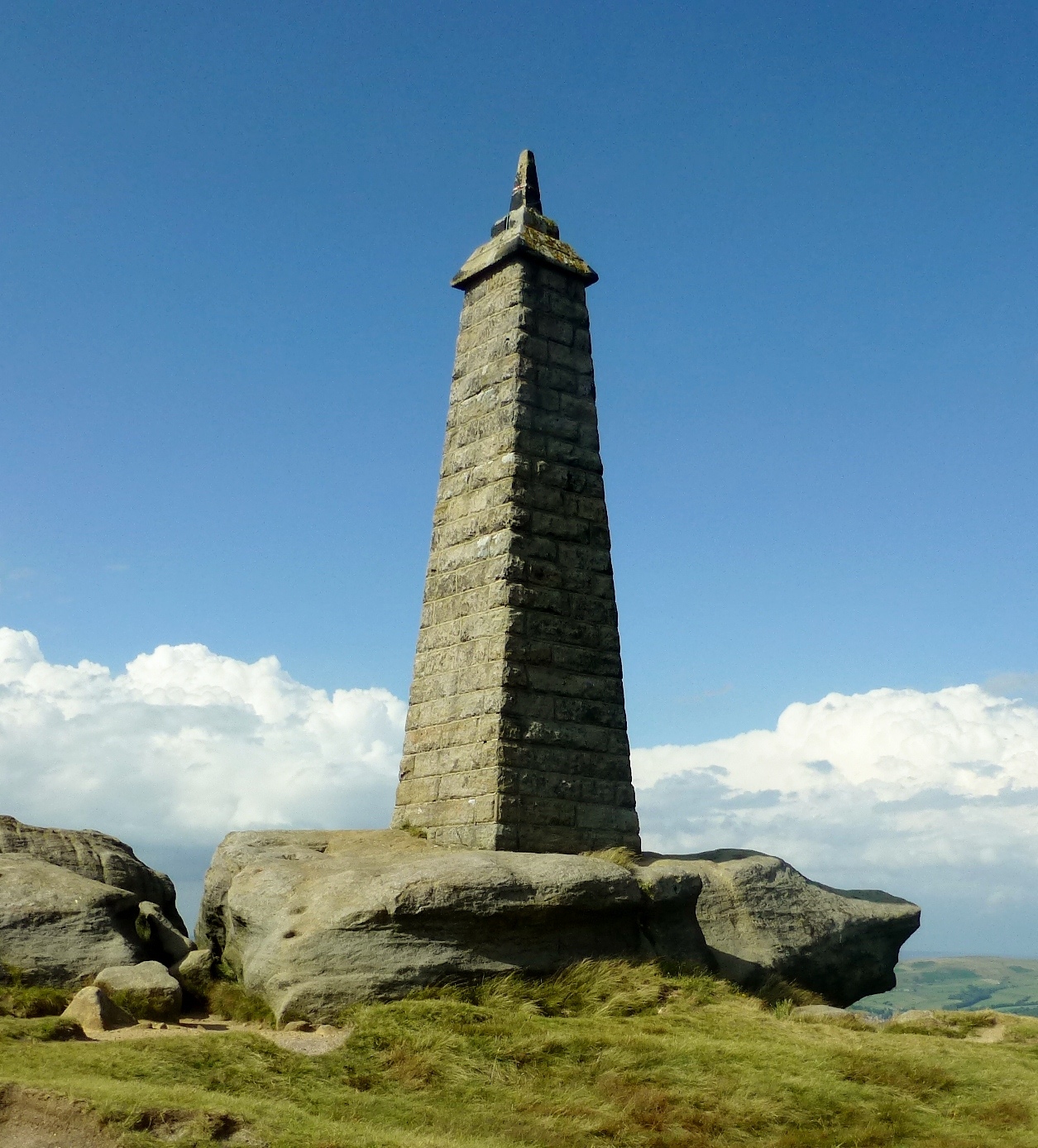
- Wainman's Pinnacle

- Location within North Yorkshire
- 53.882269°N 2.024465°W
- Nearest city: Bradford

History
- Built: 1898
- Original use: Folly
- Rebuilt: 1900

Site notes
- Architect(s): Probably R. B. Broster & Sons
- Current use: Folly

Wainman's Pinnacle is a stone obelisk atop Earl Crag in Sutton-in-Craven, North Yorkshire. It is sometimes called the 'Cowling Pinnacle' (after the nearby village of Cowling). It is nicknamed the 'The Salt Pot', with Lund's Tower known as the Pepper Pot.

Built as a folly, it has been a grade II listed building in the National Heritage List for England since 23 October 1984.

== History ==
Wainman’s Pinnacle was built in 1898 as a memorial to the Napoleonic Wars by a man known as Wainman, and is thought to have been designed by R. B. Broster & Sons. It was rebuilt in 1900 by locals following a lightning strike.

== Gallery ==
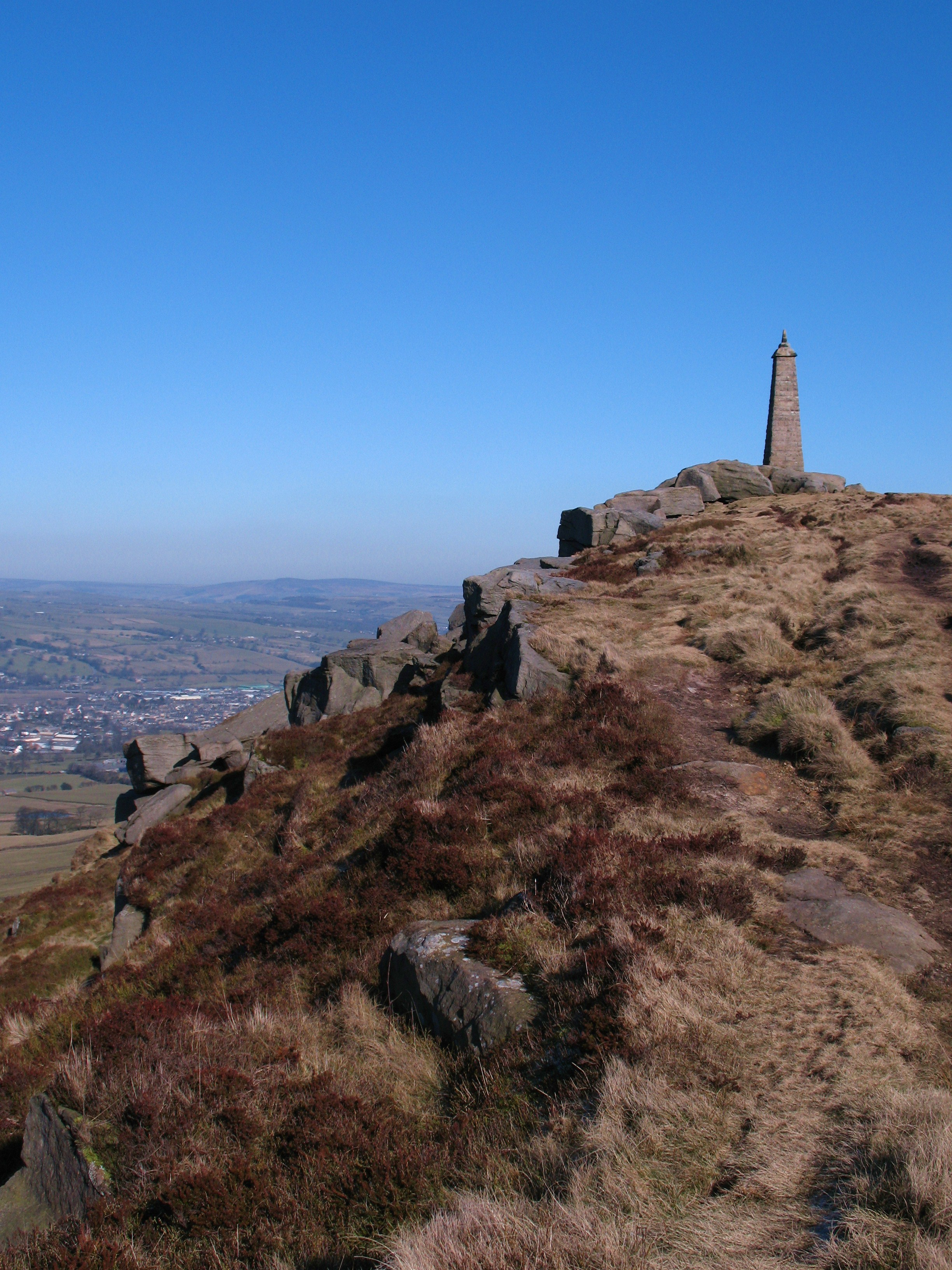
Wainman's Pinnacle

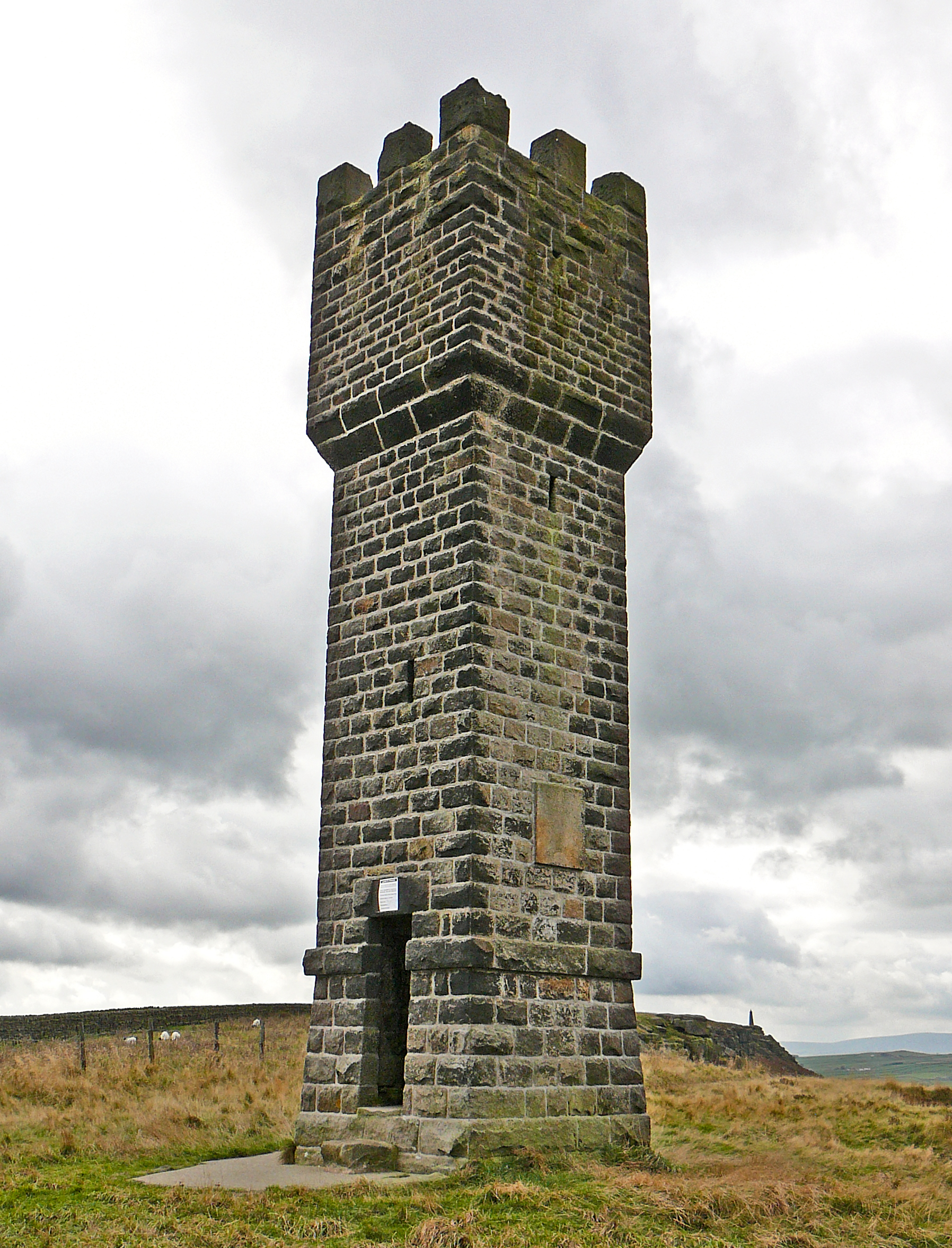
Lund's Tower, near Wainman's Pinnacle
