= Carr Head Hall =

Country house in Cowling, North Yorkshire, England

Coordinates: 53°53′41″N 2°02′22″W

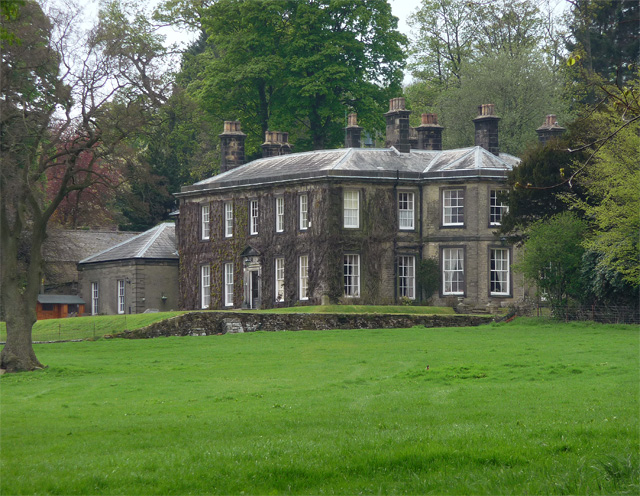
The house, in 2013

Carr Head Hall is a historic house in Cowling, a village in North Yorkshire, in England.

The house was probably built in the 1750s for Richard Wainman. It was enlarged later in the century with the addition of a hall and a new staircase, and was refurbished in 1851, from which time the decoration of the ground floor rooms other than the hall survives. The building was slightly altered in the early 20th century. It was Grade II* listed in 1954. During the 2010s, the building was restored by its owner, who ran a business making paintbrushes and running painting classes from the hall.

The house in built of stone on a plinth, with rusticated quoins, a floor band, a cornice, and a hipped slate roof. There are two storeys, and the south front has five bays. In the centre is a doorway with Doric pilasters, rosettes and triglyphs, and a pediment The east front has five bays, the middle three bays canted out, and the north front contains a Doric porch, distyle in antis. The windows are sashes in architraves. Inside, the three first floor rooms on the south front all retain their decoration from the 1750s, and the ceiling of the central lobby is also early.

== See also ==
- Grade II* listed buildings in North Yorkshire (district)
- Listed buildings in Cowling, Craven
