= Gigthis =

Ancient Punic and Roman city in southern Tunisia

- جكتيس (Arabic)
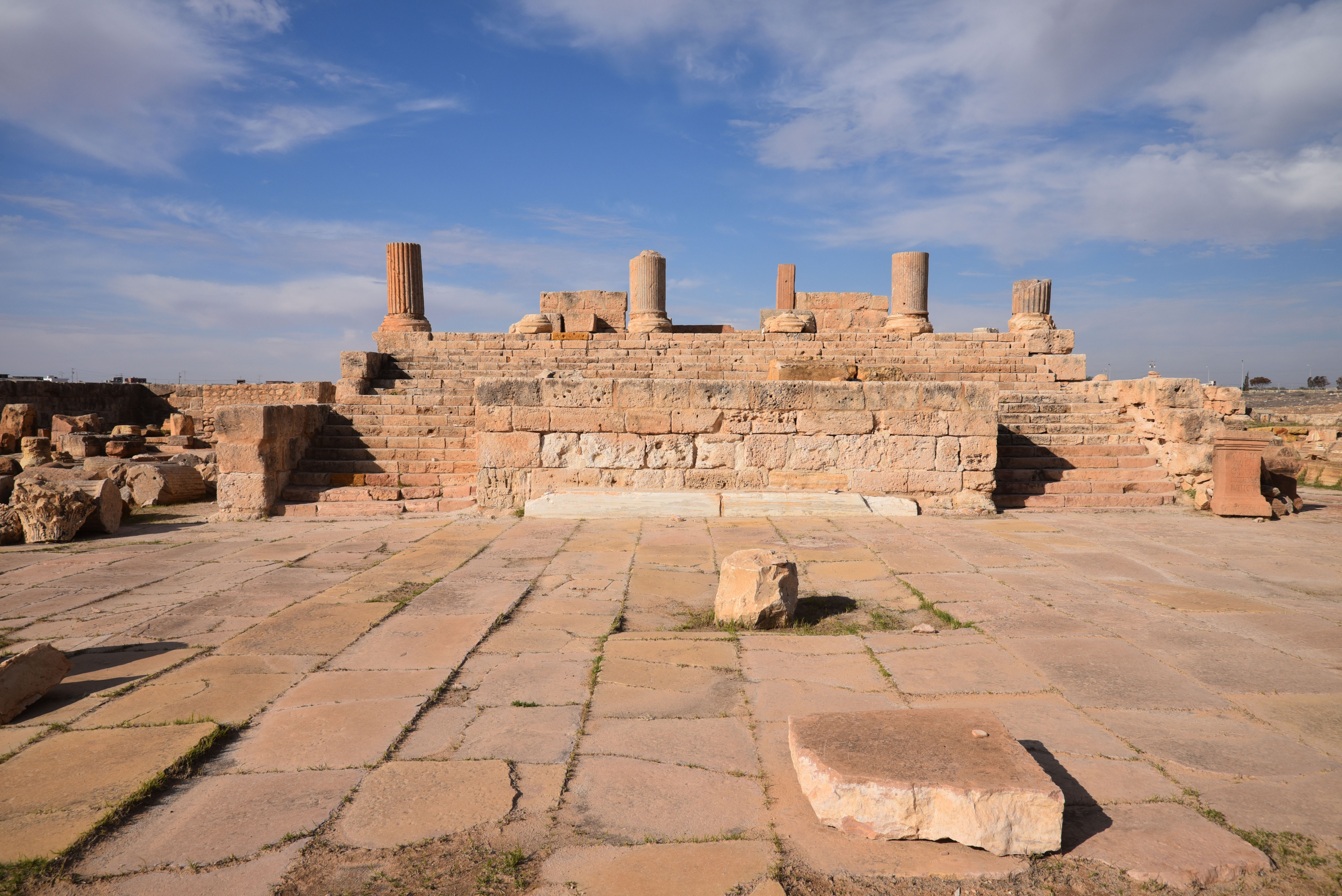
- Temple et Forum

- Location within Tunisia
- 33.53888889°N 10.67333333°E
- Type: Ancient city
- Periods: 6th century BC – 7th century AD
- Cultures: Punic, Roman
- Location: Medenine Governorate, Tunisia
- Region: Gulf of Boughrara

Site notes
- Condition: Ruins
- Public access: Yes

Gigthis (Arabic: Arabic: جكتيس, also transliterated *Jektiss* or *Jektis*) is an ancient Punic and Roman archaeological site located in southern Tunisia, within the modern Medenine Governorate. The site lies at the bottom of the Gulf of Boughrara, facing the island of Djerba, along the ancient coastal route linking Carthage to Leptis Magna.

Originally founded as a Phoenician trading post, Gigthis later became part of the Numidian kingdom before being incorporated into the Roman province of Africa Nova in 46 BCE following the Battle of Thapsus. It was subsequently attached to Africa Proconsularis and, after Diocletian's administrative reforms, to the province of Tripolitania.

Covering approximately 50 hectares on a coastal plateau about 10 metres above sea level. The site opens eastward toward the Gulf and preserves extensive remains from the Hellenistic, Roman, and Byzantine periods. Its urban layout, monumental centre, and associated necropolis illustrate the development and prosperity of the ancient city, particularly during the 2nd and 3rd centuries CE.

== Toponymy ==
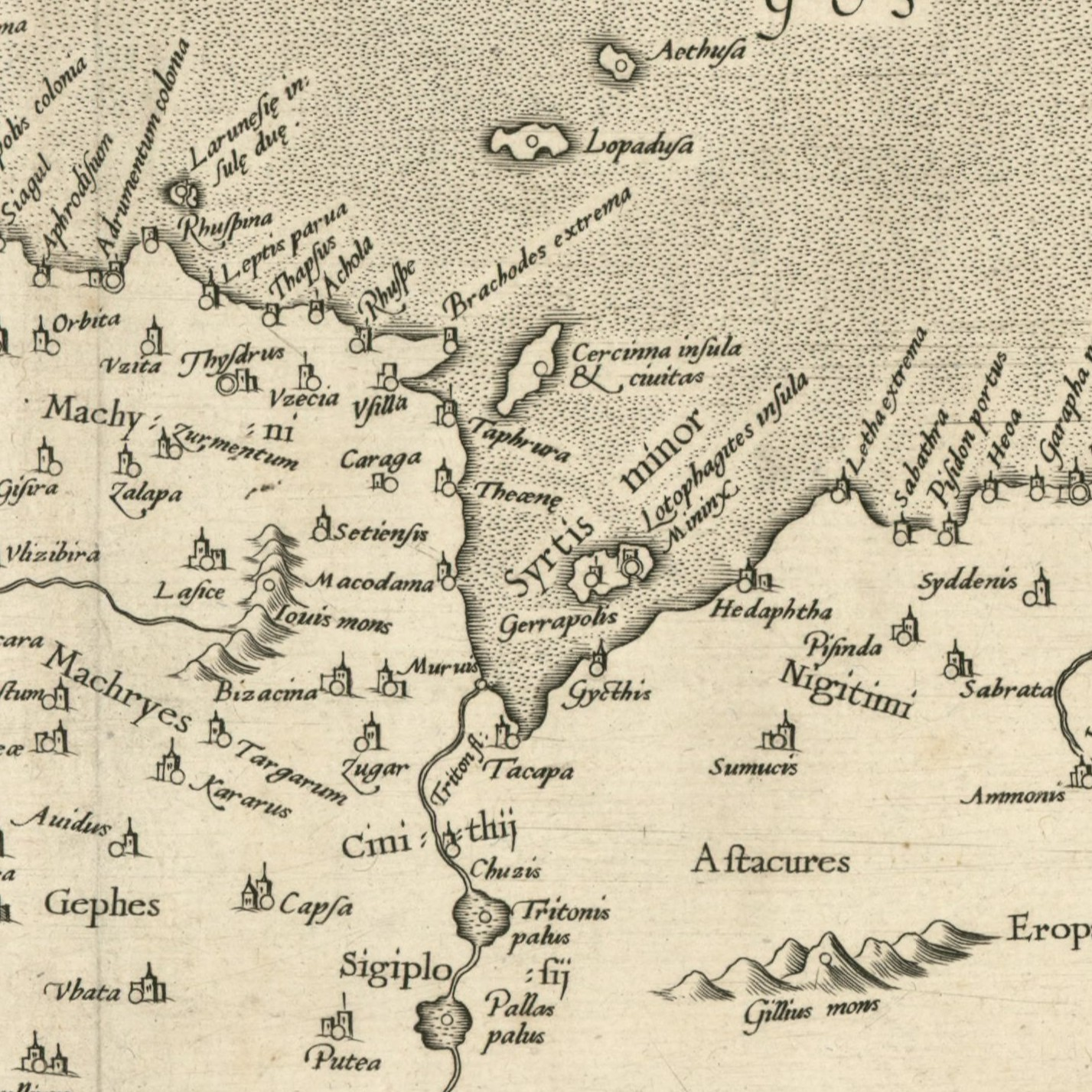
Gyethis on Ptolemy's map

The very name Gigthis has been transmitted to us in various forms by Greek and Latin texts, the oldest perhaps being Epichos in the Periplus of Scylax which, according to Müller, should be corrected to Egichtos Ptolemy writes Gichtis (Γιχθίς). which appears under the variant spelling Gyethis in early modern cartography, the Antonine Itinerary gives the form Giti municipium, Gigti (Gıgтı) in the Peutinger Table, Gitti in the Itinerarium Maritimum Gigthi and Gittit in Ravenna Cosmography. It is certain that these are merely Greek and Latin transpositions of a Punic – or Libyan – name, whose exact original form remains impossible to determine.

== History ==
=== Punic Period ===
Gigthis is first attested in the Periplus of Scylax, generally dated between 360 and 336 BCE. At that time, the port already bore this name, which is often considered to be of Phoenician origin. The coastline on which Gigthis developed had attracted both Phoenician and Greek navigators from an early period. Linguistic and historical evidence suggests that the city, like the other emporia of the Lesser Syrtis, was of Phoenician foundation, either established directly by settlers from Phoenicia or formed as part of Carthaginian expansion. The association of the cults of Liber Pater and Hercules, attested at the site, has been interpreted as an indication of a connection with Tyre. In the 4th century BCE, when the Periplus was composed, all the emporia of the two Syrtes were under Carthaginian control, including Gigthis. Its geographical position facilitated commercial exchanges with both Greece and Egypt. The mention of the port in the Periplus reflects its use by Greek sailors, while the early prominence of the cults of Serapis and Isis indicates established links with Alexandria.

=== Numid Period ===
After the Second Punic War, Massinissa exploited Carthage's decline and Rome's permissiveness to take control of the coastal emporia. Following the Third Punic War, Rome created the province of Africa but allowed Massinissa's heirs to retain their territories. Gigthis therefore remained under Numidian rule for more than a century, a period that appears to have been unfavorable to the city. While the Periplus of Scylax still mentioned Gigthis in the 4th century BCE, later geographers such as Strabo, Pomponius Mela, and Pliny the Elder omit it entirely. Polybius praised the many cities along the Lesser Syrtis, yet Livy mentions only Leptis, which quickly sought Roman protection during the Jugurthine War and received a Roman garrison. This contrast suggests a decline of the emporia under Numidian domination, with no evidence that Gigthis benefited from early Roman support.

=== Roman period ===
Gigthis came under definitive Roman control in 46 BCE, when Caesar reorganized Numidia as Africa Nova. Augustus later merged this territory with Africa Vetus, placing Gigthis within the Proconsular province for more than three centuries. The city did not fall under the later administrative reforms that affected parts of Numidia, remaining under proconsular authority like Leptis, Oea, and Tacape. Roman rule eventually brought prosperity, though the early imperial period was marked by instability, notably the revolt of Tacfarinas, which damaged the Lesser Syrtis region. Gigthis began to flourish only after the pacification of the area. A major factor in its development was the construction of the El‑Kantara causeway, which opened the gulf to wider maritime trade. As African ports increasingly supplied grain and oil to Ostia, Gigthis shifted from local cabotage to overseas export. Strong ties with Ostia are attested through municipal patrons and the presence of the cult of Cybele, likely imported from Italy.

With the pacification of the region and the revival of agriculture, Gigthis entered a period of prosperity surpassing that of the Carthaginian era. During the Antonine period, the city became well known to geographers, appearing in all surviving geographical sources of the time.

Under Hadrian, two wealthy citizens of Gigthis were appointed to judicial functions within the lower decuriae, positions requiring substantial property qualifications. Their advancement reflects the growing affluence of the local elite.

Under Antoninus Pius, Gigthis was elevated to the status of municipium, a significant administrative promotion attested by inscriptional evidence published by Gauckler. This transformation illustrates the integration of Gigthis into the Roman civic system and the consolidation of its prosperity during the High Empire. Gigthis rapidly developed into a structured municipium with a senate, magistrates, and imperial cult priests. A new harbor with a north‑oriented jetty reshaped its commercial outlook and guided the construction of a newly aligned urban center. An elegant forum with a Serapis‑Isis temple became the city's core. Prosperity from trade fueled nearly a century of civic embellishment: a new town hall in 166, major renovations of the old quarter, luxurious bath‑gymnasia in the west, and a richly adorned temple to Mercury at the century's end. In the following century, the central market was rebuilt according to contemporary architectural trends.

Gigthis experienced a steady political ascent during the Roman period. Thanks to the duumvir M. Servilius Droco Albucianus, who twice travelled to Rome, the city secured the Latium maius, granting automatic Roman citizenship to any decurion—an advance over the earlier Latium minus. Social mobility followed: before the late 2nd century, P. Curius Servilius Draco became a Roman knight and served as scriba quaestorius, a prestigious post, his status confirmed by the rare formula equo publico turma quarta. Adopted into the Curii, he is the only equestrian known from Gigthis. Senatorial figures are more numerous, including Q. Servaeus Fuscus Cornelianus, Q. Julius Severus Proculianus, Hortensianus, the Memmii, and L. Messius Rufinus. Though wealthy, these families rose slowly, their surnames often foreign to local epigraphy. Gigthenses combined wealth and influence, served as municipal patrons, and financed civic embellishments, while the community reciprocated through honors and privately funded statues, sparing the public treasury.

Septimius Severus secured the emporia from inland tribes, bringing lasting peace, and his presence remained through a colossal statue. Caracalla is frequently mentioned, notably for major road repairs in 216. Further restorations occurred under Diocletian, Maximian, and later Constantine, the last seemingly funded by the municipium itself. These successive works reflect both the economic dynamism of Gigthis and the enduring strength of its municipal administration.

Gigthis maintained an active political life well into the Late Empire, preserving earlier municipal structures. Its status rose after the provincial reorganization of the late 3rd century, when it became part of Tripolitania. Governors such as Vivius Benedictus and T. Archontius Nilus honored or supported the city, the latter even serving as its patron. In the late 4th century, the flamen Quintus acted as provincial priest and successfully led an embassy, echoing earlier legationes gratuita. Frequent appeals to the emperor for protection against nomads reflect regional instability. A reused, unfinished inscription poignantly reveals the era's growing disorder. Very few traces of Christian Gigthis have survived: a funerary inscription and a Chi Rho carved on stone. Yet we know that in 411 there was an episcopus Gittensis.

The duration of Gigthis's later phase remains uncertain. Arab historians report that, in the 7th century, the conquerors encountered prosperous Tripolitanian cities with thriving olive‑oil production and trade. If these accounts are reliable, the stark contrast between that former prosperity and the region's current desolation highlights the profound economic and environmental impact of the Arab conquest on the area.

== History of excavations ==
The credit for discovering, in 1860, the exact location of Gigthis, at the site known as Sidi‑Salem‑Bou-Ghrara, belongs to Victor Guérin. He wrote that after crossing a ravine, the platform of a hill revealed the remains of a substantial building. There he noticed several pedestals, half‑buried in the ground or beneath debris. Once the sailors of the felucca had cleared them, he was able to read the following inscription on one of them:

IMP·CAES M·AVRELIO ANTONINO PIO·FELICI AVG· GIGTHENSES PVBLICE	To the Emperor Caesar Marcus Aurelius Antoninus, the Pious and Fortunate Augustus, the people of Gigthis (dedicated this) at public expense

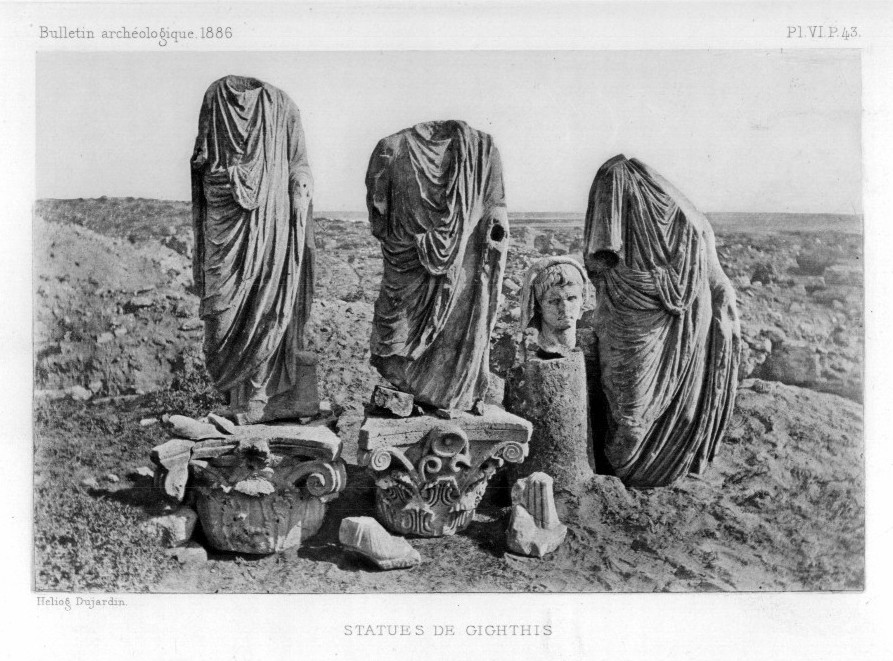
Statues de Gigthis by Reinach & Babelon

In January 1884, Reinach and Babelon began excavations and uncovered several statues, including a head of Augustus, a colossal lion torso, three large headless statues, and several inscriptions.

In July 1901 the Directorate of Antiquities and Arts, supported by the Indigenous Affairs Service and military labor, began the systematic clearing of the ancient city, starting with the Forum. The work was directed by Captain Delous, following the instructions of Eugène Sadoux. The excavation campaign resumes in November. The work is directed by Lieutenant Chauvin, who reports to Paul Gauckler each week through a detailed bulletin on the progress of the operations. Meanwhile, E. Sadoux, inspector of antiquities and arts, monitors the discoveries, sorts the inscriptions, sculptures, stucco reliefs, and architectural fragments, and oversees the consolidation and preliminary restoration of the uncovered buildings.

Between 1915 and 1916, Leopold-Albert Constans carried out a more systematic study of the site. Among recent contributions on this site are those of Ferchiou (1981), Pisanu (1990), Trousset (1998), and Bullo (2002).

== Topography ==
The ruins occupy a gently sloping plateau descending from west to east, from the area identified as the market district toward the sea. The city's forum and its annexes were located on the northern slope of this valley. To the north, along the shoreline, lie the remains of a Byzantine citadel and a large necropolis containing burials dated to the 3rd or 2nd centuries BCE. On the inland side, the western and northwestern edges of the site include additional necropolis as well as baths and gymnasia, reflecting the city's social and cultural infrastructure. The southern boundary, facing the sea, is lined with several large and luxurious villas. Inland from these structures stands a temple dedicated to Mercury, indicating both elite residential occupation and religious activity.

The centre of Gigthis was organised around the forum and its associated public buildings, forming the administrative, commercial, and religious core of the city. This central district occupied the northern slope of the valley that descends from the western market area toward the sea. Its position allowed the forum to dominate the surrounding urban landscape while remaining accessible from the principal circulation routes connecting the necropolis, residential quarters, and coastal installations.

== Construction and material ==
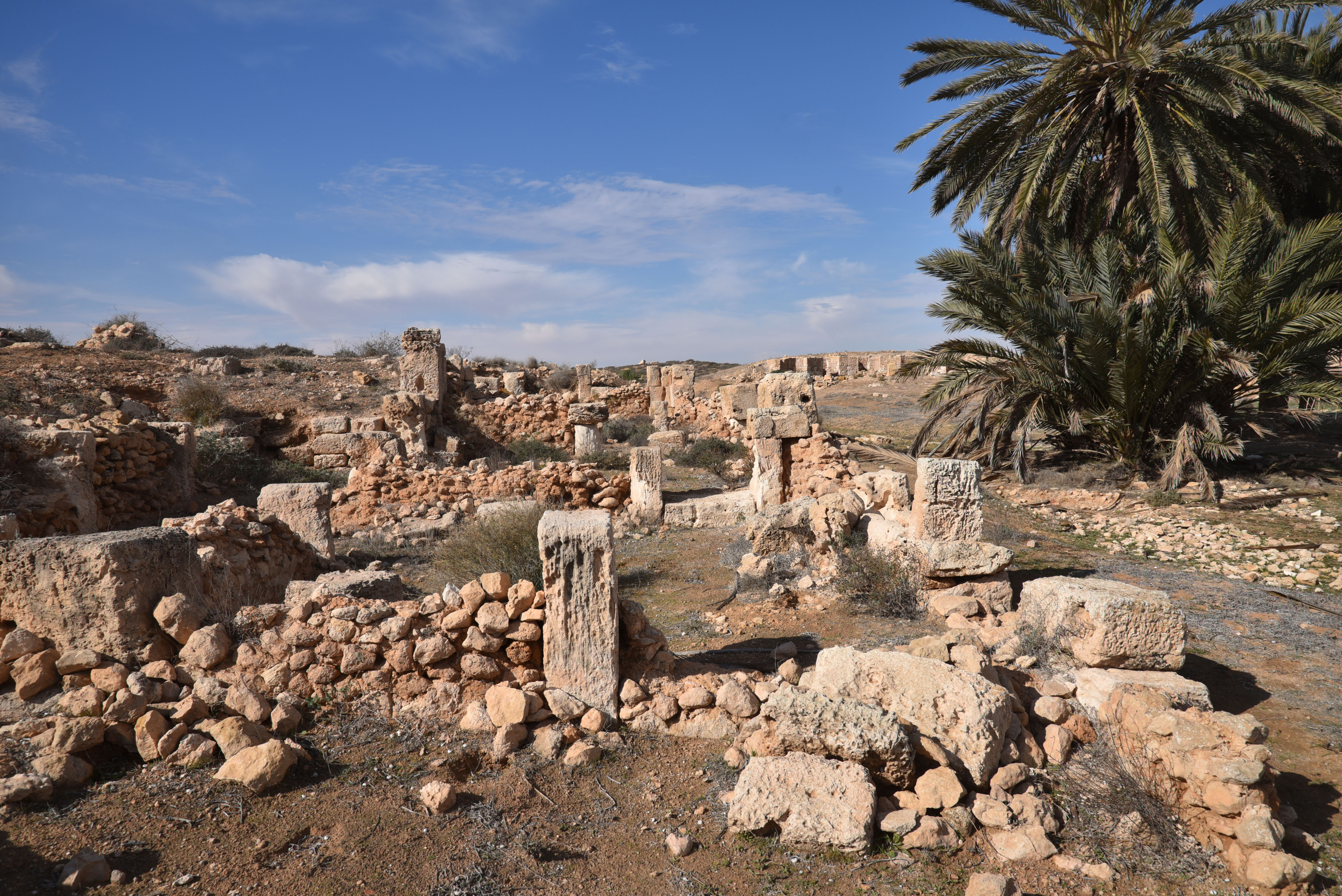
Construction with ashlar and rubble

Construction at Gigthis combines ashlar masonry and rubble walls. Ashlar uses porous white limestone blocks bonded with mortar on rubble foundations. Rubble walls employ rounded brown limestone around a dressed-stone framework, carefully worked in earlier phases; later walls mix undressed and dressed rubble in horizontal courses reminiscent of brickwork. Fired brick is rare, confined to furnaces and hypocausts, whereas sun-dried brick and rammed earth are common in houses, with only the lower 0.80–2 m of walls in rubble for strength and moisture protection.

Carved stone includes varied marbles and limestones: grey marble with violet veins, onyx veneers, and fine-grained colored limestone (mainly yellow ochre, also pink and red) for bases, entablatures, columns, and capitals, usually monolithic and seldom stuccoed. White limestone is later reused for cornices and column drums, always stuccoed; a fine grey limestone, red and grey sandstones, and grey granite also appear, notably in the temple of Mercury and the market.

Mortars range in quality, with particularly good ones at the forum and bath-gymnasium, made with imported sand, unlike the poor local sand, occasionally replaced by sea sand. Concrete in these monumental areas is extremely solid, rich in crushed tile, while abundant high-quality plaster is extensively used as white stucco, the main decorative surface coating.

== Monuments ==
=== Forum and its annexes ===
==== Forum ====
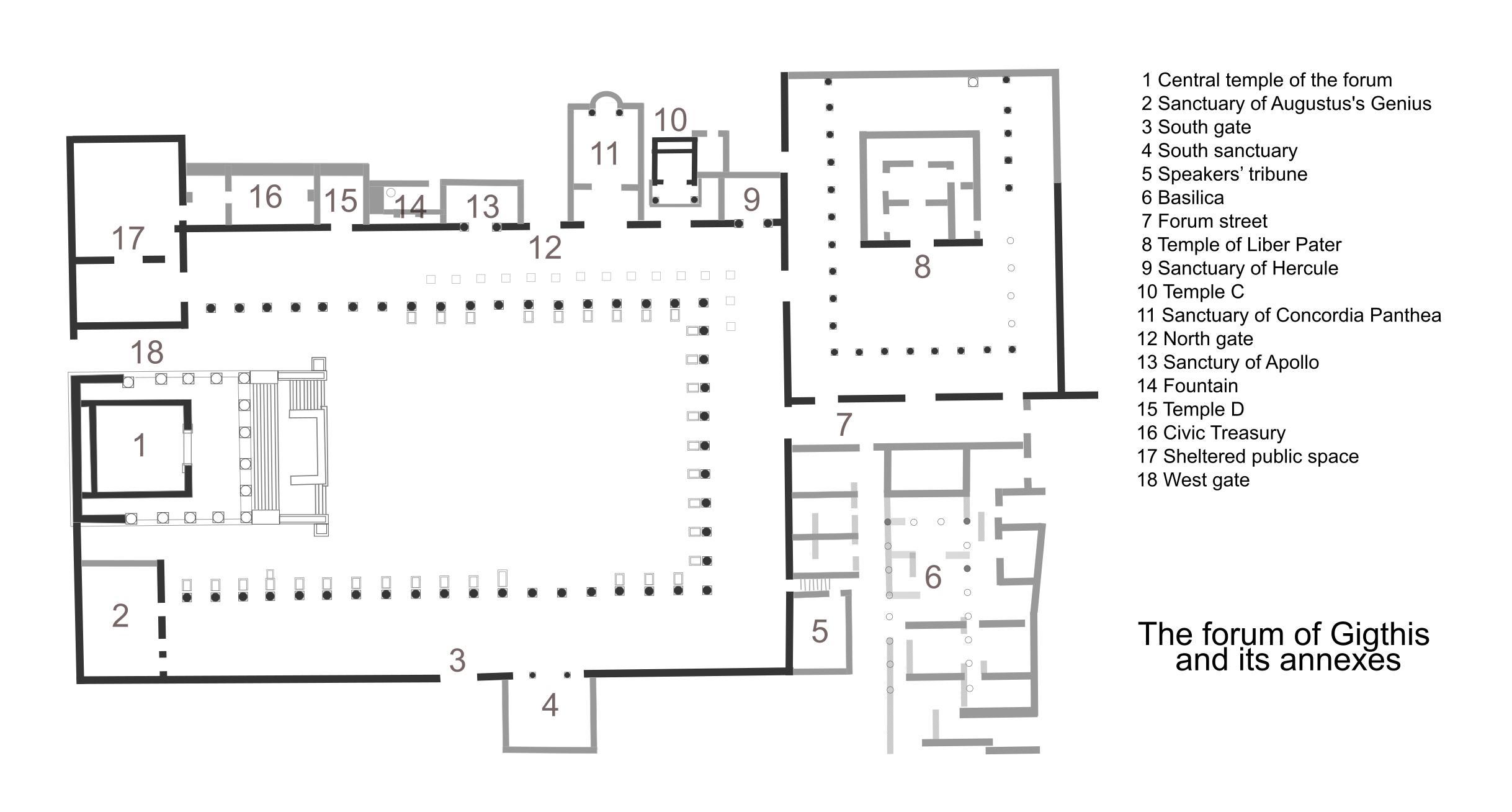
Forum and its annexes

The forum of Gigthis was a carefully planned monumental complex centered on a rectangular esplanade surrounded by porticoes on three sides and dominated to the west by a major temple. Enclosed within a large ashlar perimeter wall, the ensemble followed proportions consistent with Vitruvian architectural principles, including a deliberate WSW–ENE orientation. The esplanade and porticoes were paved with limestone slabs, and the entire area was engineered with a slight slope to ensure efficient drainage through a channel leading to the main sewer.

The porticoes featured monolithic reddish‑limestone columns with Corinthian capitals of two distinct types: an earlier classical form and a later style with broad acanthus leaves and occasional human figures, indicating phases of restoration. Portions of the north and east porticoes were doubled to provide shade in the sun‑exposed northeast corner, an area that appears to have been heavily frequented.

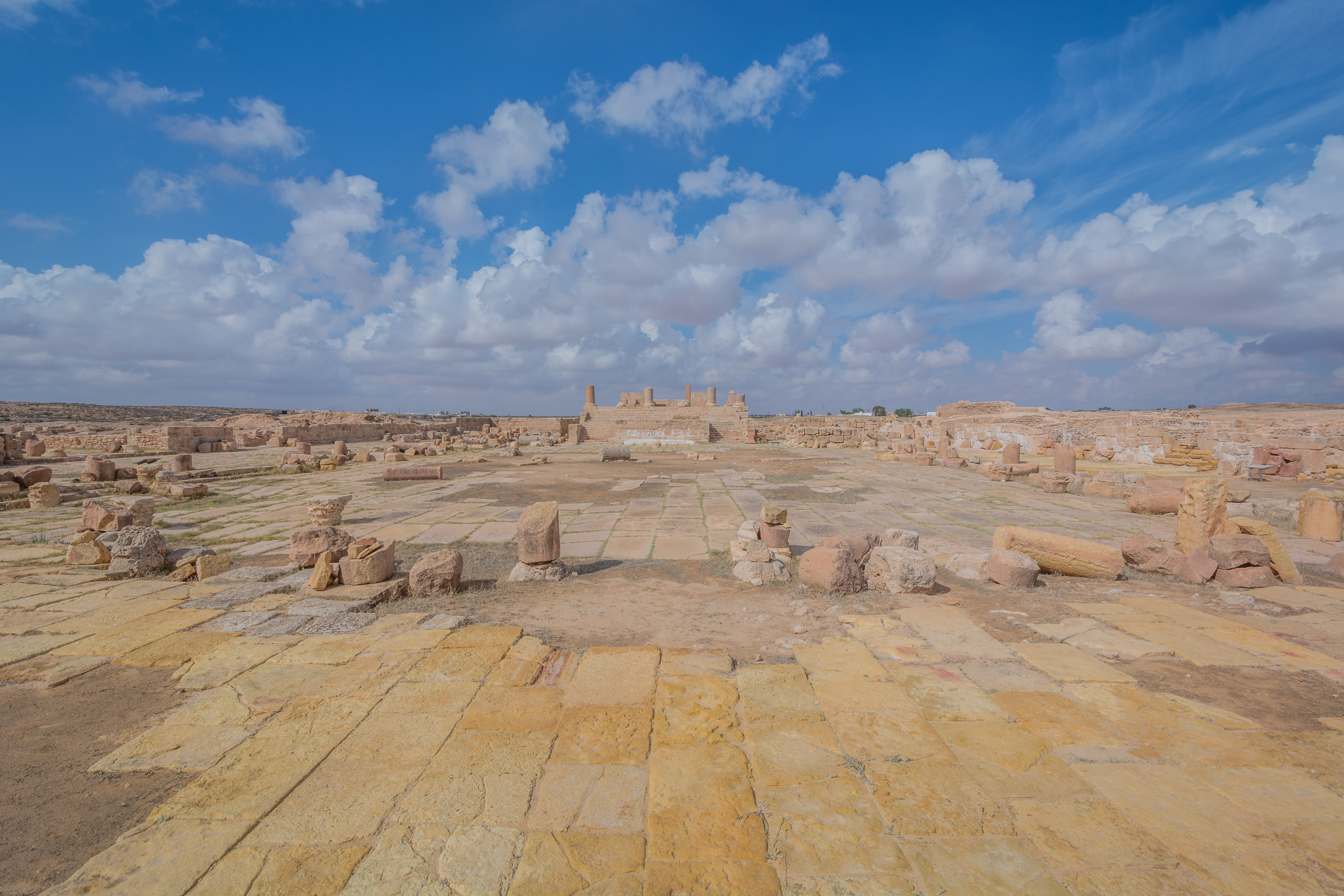
Forum and its annexes

Statues played a major role in the forum's visual program. Bases still in place show that municipal magistrates and emperors were prominently displayed, including a remarkable cross‑shaped pedestal that once supported a bronze she‑wolf with Romulus and Remus, donated by Q. Servaeus Macer. Unlike many Roman forums, Gigthis’ forum shows no evidence of permanent shops, suggesting a space primarily devoted to civic, political, and religious functions.

==== Central temple of the forum ====
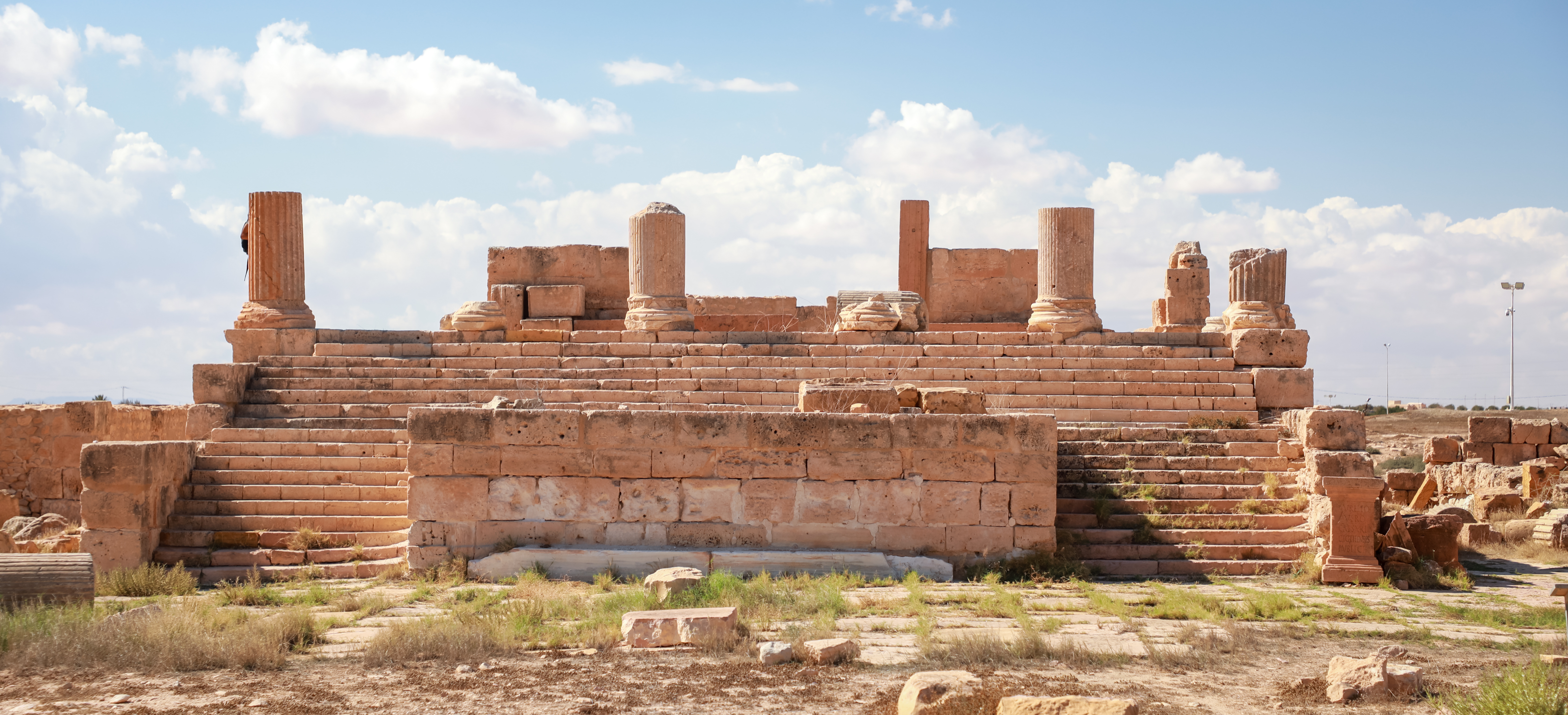
Temple

The principal monument of the forum at Gigthis was a large Corinthian temple occupying the western end of the esplanade. Hexastyle, prostyle, and pseudoperipteral in design, it was constructed mainly of large limestone blocks, with the cella walls built in rubble masonry reinforced by stone chains. The structure rose on a 3.30 m‑high podium featuring a reversed cyma base and a simple upper cornice. The podium's masonry shows deliberate reinforcement beneath the column lines, where larger blocks were alternately laid to support the weight of the superstructure.

Access to the temple was provided by a monumental staircase leading to a broad platform, possibly used for public address. The façade carried twelve grey‑violet marble columns with rudentated fluting and large Corinthian capitals, while the entablature displayed a richly ornamented cornice with stucco acanthus leaves and bead‑and‑reel motifs. Corinthian pilasters decorated the rear and lateral walls, above a continuous plinth and moulded base.

The cella, entered through a 3.10 m‑wide doorway, contained a doubled rear wall likely intended to support multiple cult statues. The entire exterior was coated in white stucco, creating a striking visual landmark for approaching sailors. Bases flanking the staircase once supported columns, one bearing a hemispherical sundial. Sculptural evidence identifies the temple as dedicated to the Sun‑god Serapis.

==== Sanctuary of Augustus's Genius ====
To the left of the temple, three thresholds give access to a large hall, 6.50 m deep and projecting 2.80 m onto the esplanade; the wall separating it from the latter is built of rubble masonry with ashlar bonding. The hall was paved, like the portico, with yellow limestone slabs. At the back and in the center, an incomplete dedication can be read on a red‑limestone base, restored as: geNIo AVGVSTI (Genius Augusti). In 1884, the marble head of the statue that stood on this base was found

==== Forum's south gate ====
In the middle of the south portico, a doorway with a red‑limestone threshold 2.90 m wide provided access to a small, paved square. The red sandstone blocks on either side preserve the cavities where the hinges were fixed, indicating the presence of a closing mechanism. From this square, two streets departed: one leading south toward the street of the baths, the other running west along the forum. The threshold raised 5 cm above the pavement, together with the similar arrangement of the northern and eastern doors, shows that access to the forum was closed to vehicles and that the area was shut off in the evening. These features reflect strict control of circulation and an urban layout designed to preserve the civic and ceremonial character of the forum.

==== South Sanctuary ====
East of the main entrance of the south portico, an open sanctuary formed by a wide, column‑divided bay provided a decorative focal point on the forum. Built of rubble masonry with ashlar reinforcement, the structure preserved traces of grey‑marble revetment and contained a moulded cubic base that once supported a statue. The sanctuary functioned as an exedra rather than an enclosed chamber, and its ornamental character is confirmed by the presence of elongated pedestals likely intended for equestrian statues.

==== Speakers’ tribune ====
The rear of the south portico features a red‑limestone socle supporting white‑limestone blocks and a well‑preserved staircase leading to a raised concrete platform overlooking both the forum and the basilica. A moulded cornice and architectural details indicate a formal, monumental structure. The platform likely functioned as a speakers’ tribune, confirmed by an inscribed limestone block and the probable presence of a Victory statue, consistent with Roman traditions associating such monuments with military triumphs. Stylistic evidence and the reference to the victoria Britannica (AD 210) suggest a Severan‑period construction. The tribune may have served both civic and judicial purposes.

==== Basilica ====
The basilica’s original plan is difficult to reconstruct due to extensive Byzantine‑period alterations, though surviving column bases indicate three naves and a rear tribune. Small rooms flanking the lateral naves resemble those at Timgad and may have served as shops or offices; at Gigthis, some contain early stone vaults possibly used to store valuable archives. The structure featured stucco‑coated white‑limestone Doric columns. The main entrance likely stood at the south, with a secondary access from the forum and another from the port district. Architectural irregularities—such as an oblique wall and the misalignment of Forum Street—suggest the basilica predates surrounding constructions and was preserved during urban reorganization. Later reconstructions, possibly in the 3rd century, introduced new columns and modifications. In late antiquity, the building underwent major changes, and Christian inscriptions hint at a possible, though unconfirmed, reuse for Christian worship.

==== Forum Entrance ====
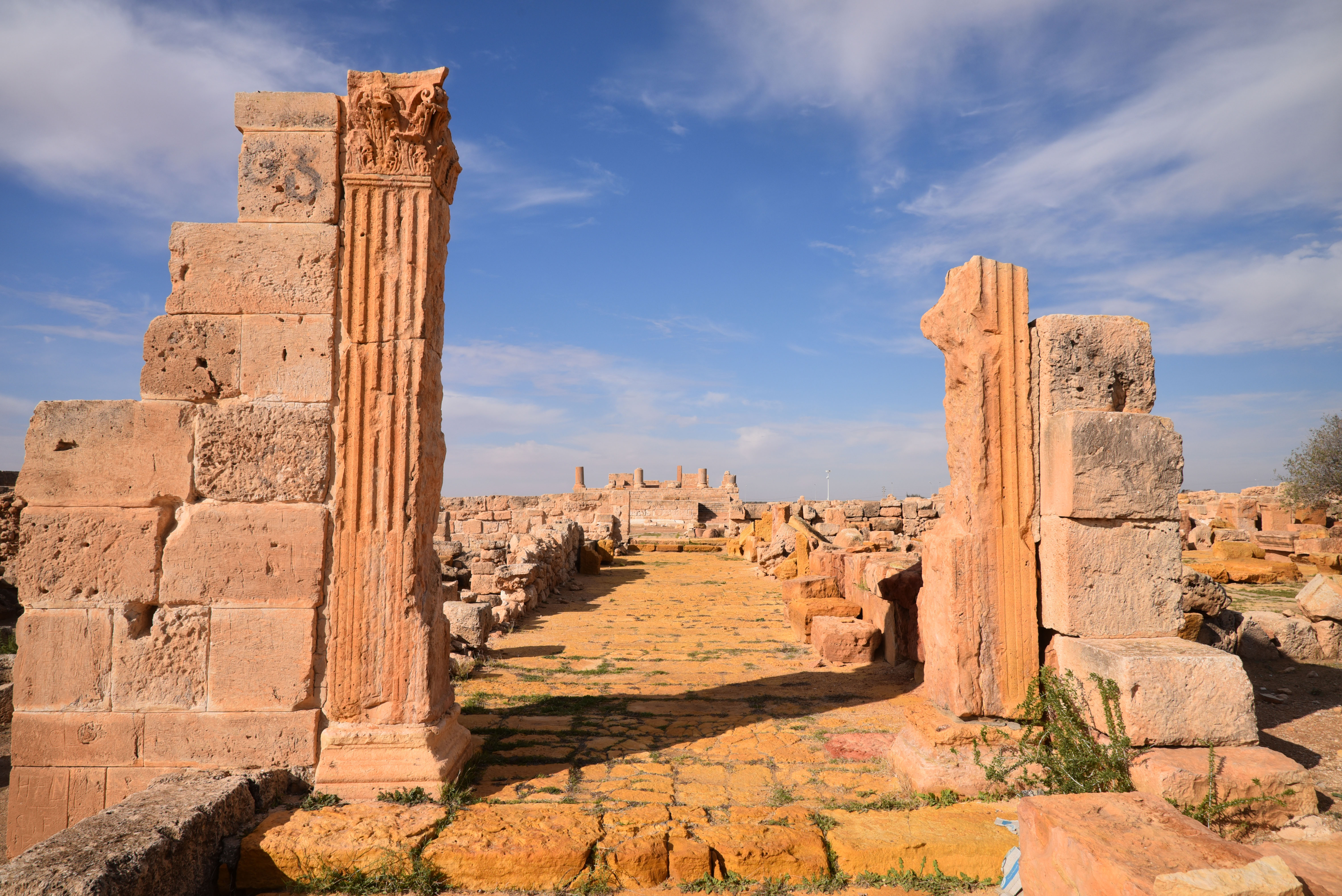
Forum east entrance

The eastern entrance of the forum was a monumental doorway built in red limestone, without stucco. It consisted of two square, fluted pillars resting on a moulded base and topped with Corinthian capitals decorated with water‑leaf motifs and rosettes. A seven‑block arch, richly moulded on both exterior and interior faces, formed the curved opening. Above it stood an attic crowned by a cornice. Two inscribed yellow‑limestone plaques—once part of this attic—were later reused in the street paving. The structure reflects a carefully designed and prominently decorated access point to the forum.

==== Temple of Liber Pater ====
Identified with certainty through its dedicatory inscription, occupies a prominent position along the eastern side of the forum and corresponds to Temple B on the site plan. Epigraphic evidence associates its construction with the reign of Marcus Aurelius and links it to M. Julius Mundus, situating the monument in the late 2nd century CE, a period of civic prosperity and architectural ambition. Unlike Temple A, built half a century earlier in strict imitation of Roman prototypes, this temple reveals a distinctly provincial architectural creativity. Its capitals combine oves, darts, divergent sepals, and paired volutes connected to the abacus rosette by elegant vegetal stems, forming an original decorative system that departs from classical norms while retaining Ionic foundations. The temple's plan is equally singular. A corridor surrounds the cella, perhaps linked to the mysteries of Dionysos‑Liber, whose cult often involved ritual circumambulation. The pronaos and naos are defined by an internal double wall contemporary with the original construction. The surrounding portico, paved in yellow limestone and supported by 28 monolithic columns, reinforces the monument's stylistic coherence. This architectural language reappears in the Temple of Mercury, confirming the emergence of a local or regional school in the second half of the 2nd century.

==== Sanctuary of Hercule ====
The small sanctuary adjoining the portico forms a compact yet carefully arranged sacred space, measuring 3.70 m by 5 m and accessed through a wide threshold framed by two column bases. Its preserved plastered walls and well‑maintained paving indicate deliberate integration into the surrounding architectural complex. Inside, a large square base stands against the rear wall, while two superimposed limestone substructures—one grey, one yellow—face the entrance, echoing the arrangement found at the altar of the Temple of Mercury. Archaeological finds identify the sanctuary as dedicated to Hercules. A finely carved marble head crowned with vine leaves, clearly inspired by a Greek original, evokes the traditional association between Hercules and Dionysos. A marble block carved with a lion's paw likely served as the god's seat, suggesting a seated cult statue. The sanctuary's placement near the Temple of Liber Pater reflects the strong regional pairing of Hercules and Dionysos, a relationship rooted in Phoenician religious traditions and attested on coins from Leptis Magna and Sabratha.

==== Temple C ====
It is one of the forum's only structures built in large ashlar masonry, closely related to Temple A and likely dating to Hadrian's reign. Its layout features a paved courtyard leading to a high, richly moulded podium framed by columns and pilasters with characteristic yellow limestone bases. The naos is extremely small, with a doubled rear wall suggesting a continuous base for statues. The most unusual aspect is the complete absence of an entrance: no frontal staircase, no doorway from the lateral corridor, and no hinge marks on the naos threshold. This indicates that the building functioned as an elegant aedicula meant to shelter statues rather than as an accessible temple.

==== Sanctuary of Concordia Panthea ====
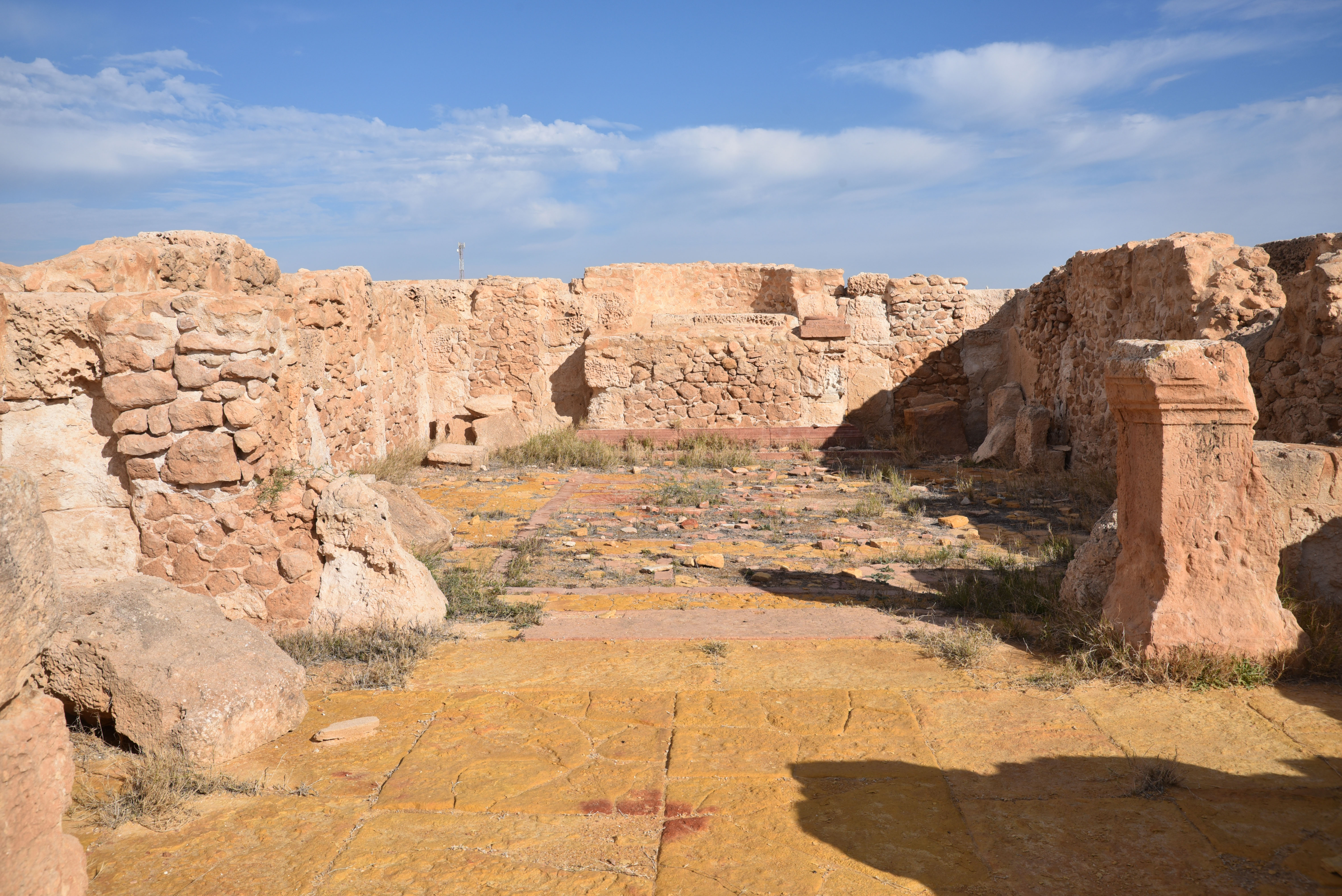
Concordia Panthea Sanctuary

The sanctuary is a rubble masonry structure reinforced with cut stone chains and accessed by two broad steps beneath the portico. Its pronaos, open and unclosed, contrasts with the naos, which was secured by a door whose hinge holes remain visible. The naos walls preserve traces of plaster and once carried a decorative moulding, reconstructed from white limestone fragments featuring a cyma and recessed band. The pavement is remarkably intact, arranged in alternating rectangular fields—plain or decorated with disks—using polychrome stones that create vivid red motifs on a yellow background. At the rear stands a substantial base set on a red limestone slab, deepening into a niche in its upper part. This base was adorned with yellow limestone facing and a red moulding, and supported a pedimented aedicula with twisted columns. The aedicula housed a statue now preserved in the Bardo Museum.

==== Sanctury of Apollo ====
A long rectangular room (6 meters in length and 3.30 meters in depth) opened directly onto the portico. On each side of the entrance, large blocks 0.37 meters high supported red limestone column bases of a massive type. These bases carried smooth yellow limestone columns. The walls were built in the same manner as those of the Sanctuary of Concord; traces of a fairly thick plaster coating can still be seen. The floor is made of concrete, except at the back, where a 0.70‑meter square seems to indicate the location of a base. This room was a sanctuary of Apollo, dedicated in 162 by M. Ummidius Annianus Quadratianus, according to an inscription whose fragments were found in the room itself.

==== Fountain ====
Room with a deep cistern connected to a masonry block likely supporting a water reservoir. Similar systems in nearby baths support this interpretation. Two parallel walls probably held a fountain fed by this reservoir, a hypothesis strengthened by the discovery of bronze basin fragments. The fountain may have featured an Ocean mask found in Temple B, part of reused materials from the forum. The monument was likely dedicated in 164 by Q. Servaeus.

==== Sheltered public space ====
The passage describes two adjoining rooms, E and F, accessed through a wide threshold with limestone steps. Room E, built in large ashlar blocks, shows significant later modifications, including reused architectural elements such as a base dedicated to Antoninus Pius and a stucco‑coated limestone block. The head of Jupiter Serapis was once embedded in its walls. Its floor, raised above the portico, is paved with yellow limestone. Room F, larger and more elaborate, is reached through two unequal thresholds. Its white‑limestone walls are divided by pillars that likely supported groin vaults, implying a structure with three naves and two rows of columns. Marble paving survives only in the central nave, and a deep well opens in the floor. Room E appears to have served as a vestibule, while F functioned as a hall for rest and conversation. The ensemble resembles a non‑judicial basilica, matching Vitruvian proportions and serving as a sheltered public space.

==== Civic Treasury ====
Two elevated rooms, one square and the other elongated, situated 1.10 m above the portico level. Their construction is unusual: the northern wall consists of two rubble walls built together, while the southern and eastern walls double existing structures of the forum and room D. Embedded at regular intervals are large limestone blocks with triangular tops, designed to support the springings of substantial vaults. These vaults, now sealed by adjacent walls, served purely structural purposes, reinforcing the building while economizing materials. The massive nature of the walls indicates that the rooms supported a significant superstructure. The lower rooms beneath them resemble the subterranean chambers commonly found beneath temples, used to store civic funds. This architectural configuration strongly suggests that the complex housed the city's aerarium, its official treasury.

=== Great temple ===
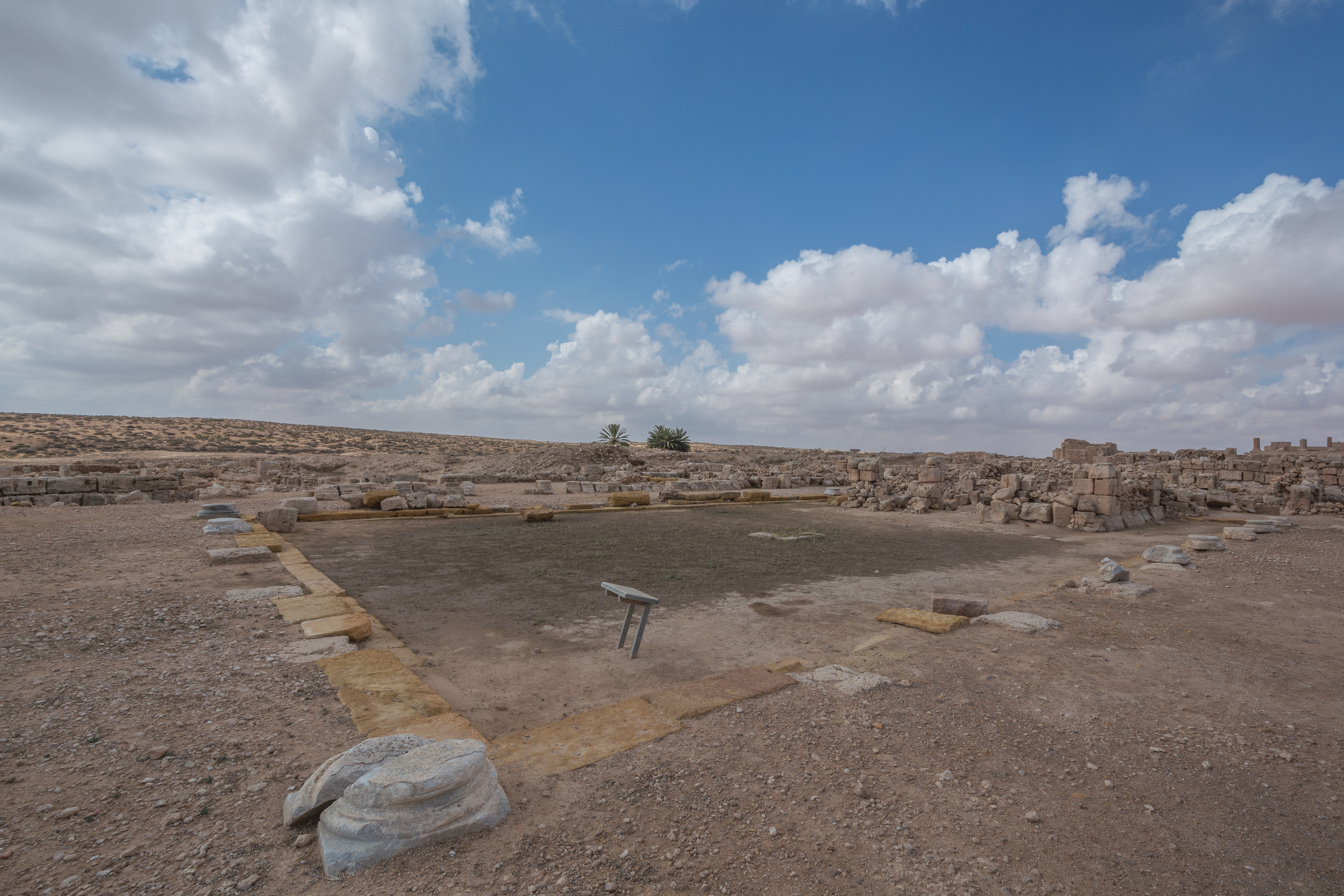
Great temple

It is a major monumental structure organized around a rectangular courtyard measuring 20 × 8.20 m, bordered on three sides by porticoes. The western side was occupied by the cella, of which only the foundations remain. The porticoes featured twenty‑two bluish‑marble column bases supporting smooth red‑limestone columns. Two white‑limestone capitals, one heavily eroded, identify the temple as Ionic, with broad volutes and a palm‑leaf motif. Fragments of a stuccoed cornice were also recovered. The temple stood on a podium built of rubble masonry bonded with coarse mortar, preserved to a height of 1.50–2 m. The plan shows a 3.30 m pronaos and a 6 m cella. The front staircase, now lost, likely spanned the entire façade. The peribolos combines ashlar masonry on the north and east with rubble on the west, where it borders the basilica street. Structural analysis indicates that the temple and this street were built simultaneously.

The monument's orientation suggests an earlier sanctuary once stood on the same site. Later urban modifications reshaped its surroundings, including the closure of the street of the baths and the creation of a large esplanade. The temple's cult remains unknown, despite the discovery of a finely carved marble female head.

=== Portico Court ===
It is an architectural complex located south of the square in front of the great temple, whose function remains uncertain. First uncovered during the 1902 excavations and re‑examined in 1906, it was initially interpreted as a market, an idea later abandoned due to lack of evidence. The structure consists of an open rectangular courtyard, measuring approximately 6.30 × 12 m, surrounded on all sides by a portico of varying width. The portico rests on sixteen stuccoed white‑limestone columns with heavy bases and Doric capitals similar to those of the judicial basilica, reflecting a design that is careful yet relatively modest. The main access is through a northern vestibule divided into three rooms opening onto the square, two of which communicate directly with the portico. The walls, built of rubble mixed with friable limestone, include limited use of ashlar masonry on the eastern side. The complex fits into a topographical context comparable to that of the nearby temples of Aesculapius and Mercury, both built on sloping ground and preceded by an intermediate portico between the square and the sanctuary.The surrounding houses, featuring narrow ventilation courtyards and lacking columns, indicate a district of modest apartment buildings intended for lower‑income residents.

=== Temple of Aesculapius ===
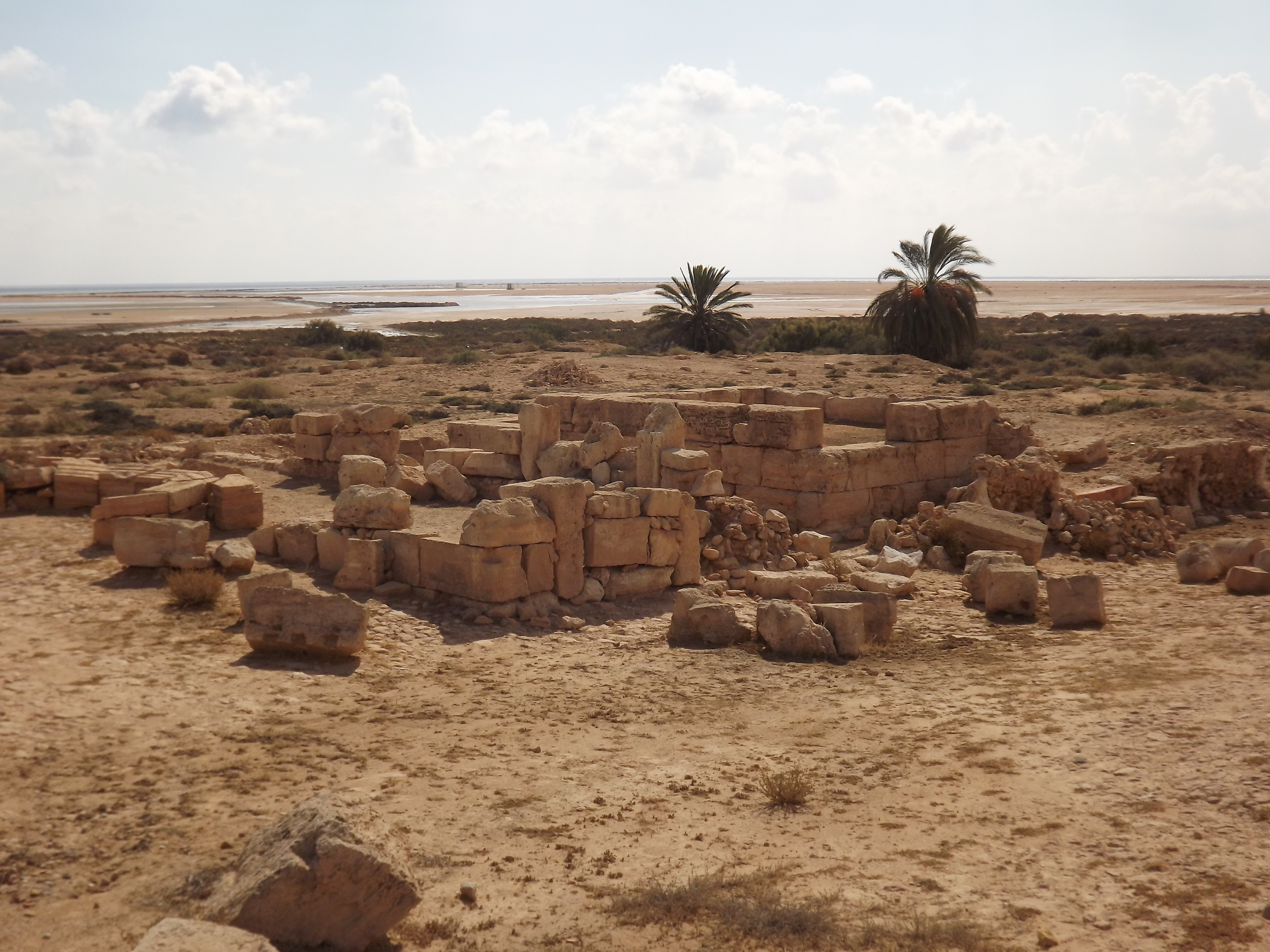
Temple of Aesculapius

It is a small sanctuary accessed from a sloping street running along the eastern side of the terrace of the porticoed square. Opposite the vestibule of this square, a staircase of four red‑limestone steps, flanked by two columns, leads to three successive landings. These stepped platforms, built with heterogeneous masonry, provide access to a rectangular structure measuring approximately 7 × 4 m. The temple consists of a cella preceded by a pronaos, constructed in well‑jointed ashlar blocks. The walls, preserved to about one metre above the surrounding ground, were levelled at the height of the temple floor. The original entrance was located on the east side, but was relocated when the adjacent street was opened. At the rear, a semicircular niche built of rubble masonry was partially destroyed by this later street construction. A major refurbishment, contemporary with modifications to the neighbouring square, is indicated by a series of grey‑limestone column drums coated in white stucco and aligned on the second landing, as well as by a cornice fragment with an Egyptian gorge profile belonging to an earlier phase of the monument.

A sculpted fragment found within the building—a bas‑relief showing part of a leg and a staff encircled by a serpent—identifies the deity worshipped as Aesculapius, assimilated in Africa to the Phoenician god Eshmoun. This cult was widespread in the region and appears on the coinage of Septimius Severus, where the god is depicted within a distyle temple, a configuration likely shared by the sanctuary at Gigthis.

=== The jetty ===
The jetty of the ancient port of Gigthis is today reduced to scattered white‑limestone blocks, partly blackened by the sea and partly embedded in silt, yet still outlining its original form. It consisted of a 17‑metre‑wide, 140‑metre‑long causeway ending in a rounded mole, now barely submerged at high tide. Although its exact arrangement is uncertain, the Gigthis jetty was adorned with a Corinthian colonnade, two capitals of which survive. Their style matches that of the forum's temple and portico, dating the structure to the early first century CE.

=== Baths ===
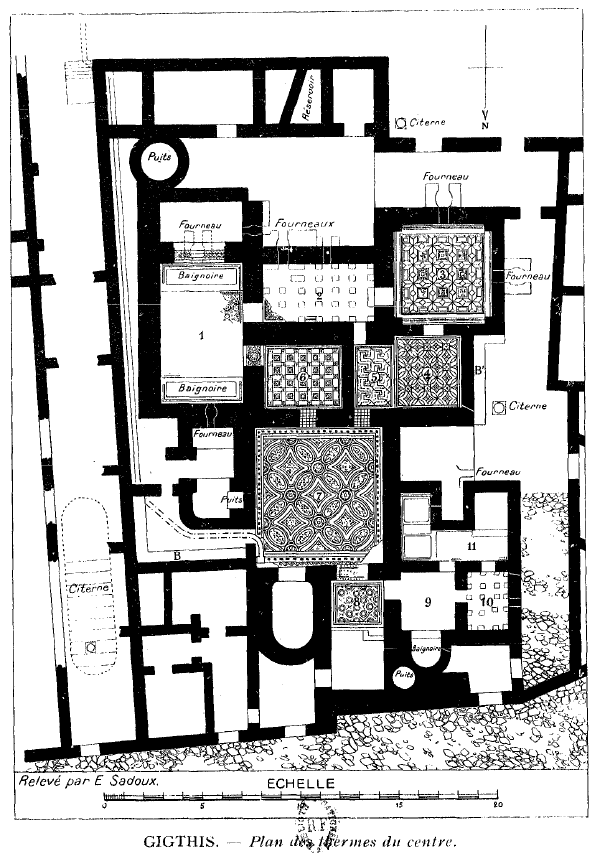
Plan des thermes de Gigthis

Two adjacent yet independent establishments form one of Gigthis's best‑preserved bath complexes, illustrating the evolution of African bath architecture from the Imperial period to late antiquity. The complex is poorly documented; the painted façade inscription survives only in fragments. Its cardinal orientation suggests a foundation before the major 2nd‑century developments. The small north‑western baths form the earliest nucleus; a larger but similar unit was later added without replacing the first, perhaps reserved for women. In the later 2nd century, a new diagonal street altered access. Afterward, a fire required major rebuilding, especially of the frigidarium's north wall. Mosaics from this phase show Severan style, and later repairs and mosaics indicate prolonged use.

The entrance is on the south side of the street, opposite a small sanctuary, is marked by column bases in red limestone. Two vestibules—one with circular‑medallion mosaics—lead to the small baths on the right and the large baths to the south. The frigidarium (9) contains a square tub supplied by a rear well; a raised platform likely supported a reservoir. The tepidarium (10) was heated by a hypocaust. The caldarium (11), with two wings and a central vestibule, had heated basins and possibly a steam room. All rooms originally had geometric mosaics.

In the large baths, the frigidarium (7), 6.50 × 7 m, preserves a complex mosaic; heterogeneous masonry and a reused Ionic capital indicate late repairs. A large tub drains into the main sewer. A bent corridor with benches likely served attendants. A nearby room contains a well similar to that of the small baths. The tepidarium (2) exposes hypocaust pillars. The caldarium (1) held rectangular heated tubs. The steam room (3), a Vitruvian concamarata sudatio, had two furnaces; three mosaic panels (Venus, Mercury, wrestlers) are in the Bardo Museum. Room 4, indirectly heated, was probably for massage. Vestibule 5 linked the heated rooms to the frigidarium.

Debris suggests an upper floor for rest and exercise. Porticoes surrounded the complex, and mud‑brick rooms likely housed slaves. Water supply was limited and depended on three wells and three cisterns, the largest 9 × 2.35 m and 3.50 m deep.

=== Western Baths‑Palaestra ===
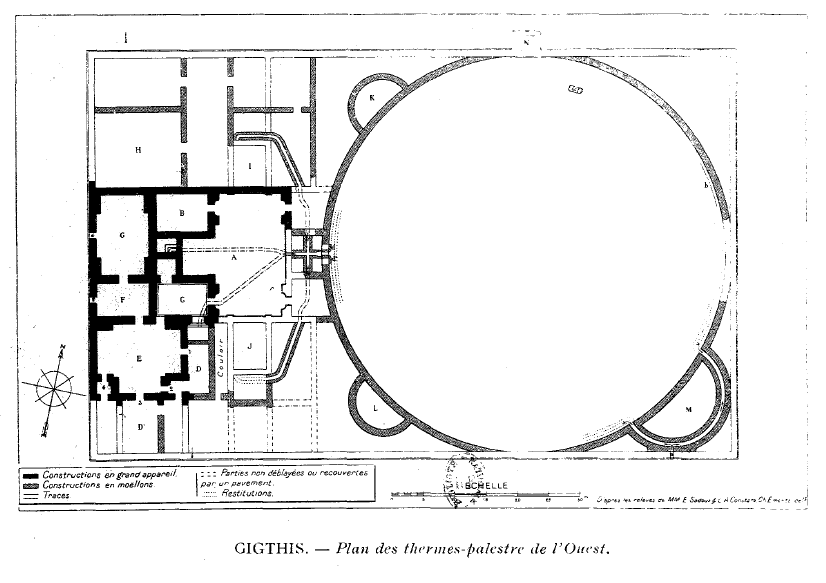
Plan of the Western Baths‑Palaestra of Gigthis

The western baths‑palaestra of Gigthis form one of the largest monumental complexes of the city, although their history remains poorly documented. Their occupation appears to have been relatively brief, as "they were built later and abandoned earlier". The complex lies 200 m west of the forum and follows a rectangular plan measuring 104 × 66 m, oriented from east‑north‑east to south‑south‑west, an orientation consistent with Vitruvius’ recommendations for bath buildings. The rectangular enclosure contained, on its western side, a suite of thermal rooms, and to the east, "a vast circular enclosure inscribed within a square 66 m on each side".

The arena, filled entirely with sand, was surrounded by a wall built of rubble masonry with ashlar bonding. Three semicircular exedrae (K, L, M) were arranged along its perimeter. Exedra M, bordered by a canal 0.60 m wide and 1.20 m deep, is interpreted as a latrine. A complex hydraulic system included several channels, notably two divergent conduits (d and d’) running along the circular enclosure and draining water from the cold pools of the baths, likely toward a sump within the arena. Vitruvius recommends the presence of exedrae beneath the porticoes of square palaestrae, but at Gigthis no exedra existed in the north‑east corner, probably due to constant sun exposure making the space impractical.

Access to the baths was through a square vestibule linking the arena to the bath pavilion. This vestibule opened into a triple antechamber leading to the central hall A (19.60 × 11.20 m), identified as the ephebeum described by Vitruvius. The hall was built of well‑cut white limestone blocks and paved with marble. Two rectangular rooms, B and C, opened symmetrically on either side of the central exedra. Room B likely corresponds to the coryceum, a storage area for athletes’ bags (3), while room C—equipped with a basin and an evacuation channel—is identified as the elaiothesium, where oil for athletes was stored.

North and south of the ephebeum were two symmetrical frigidaria (I and J), each ending in a square pool. Their arrangement matches Vitruvius’ prescribed sequence of rooms: coryceum, conisterium, frigida lavatio on the right; elaiothesium, frigidarium, iter in propnigeum on the left. To the west, the large hall H (14 × 12 m) is interpreted as a covered exercise room, possibly a sphaeristerium or palaestra.

The hot rooms E, F, and G were built over hypocausts 0.85 m high. The caldarium E contained three bathtubs heated by several furnaces, including furnace 2, whose vault was found intact. Rooms F and G received heat through openings (5 and 6) in the western wall, although this arrangement appears to be a later modification. Room G features a distinctive system of vertical grooves—0.40 m wide and 0.16 m deep—interpreted as flue‑like chimneys designed to evacuate hot air and smoke from the hypocausts.

No inscriptions or artworks were found within the monument. The structure shows no signs of violent destruction but rather those of a building "decommissioned and methodically stripped at an early date".

== Main findings ==
=== Statues ===
==== Statue of Concordia ====
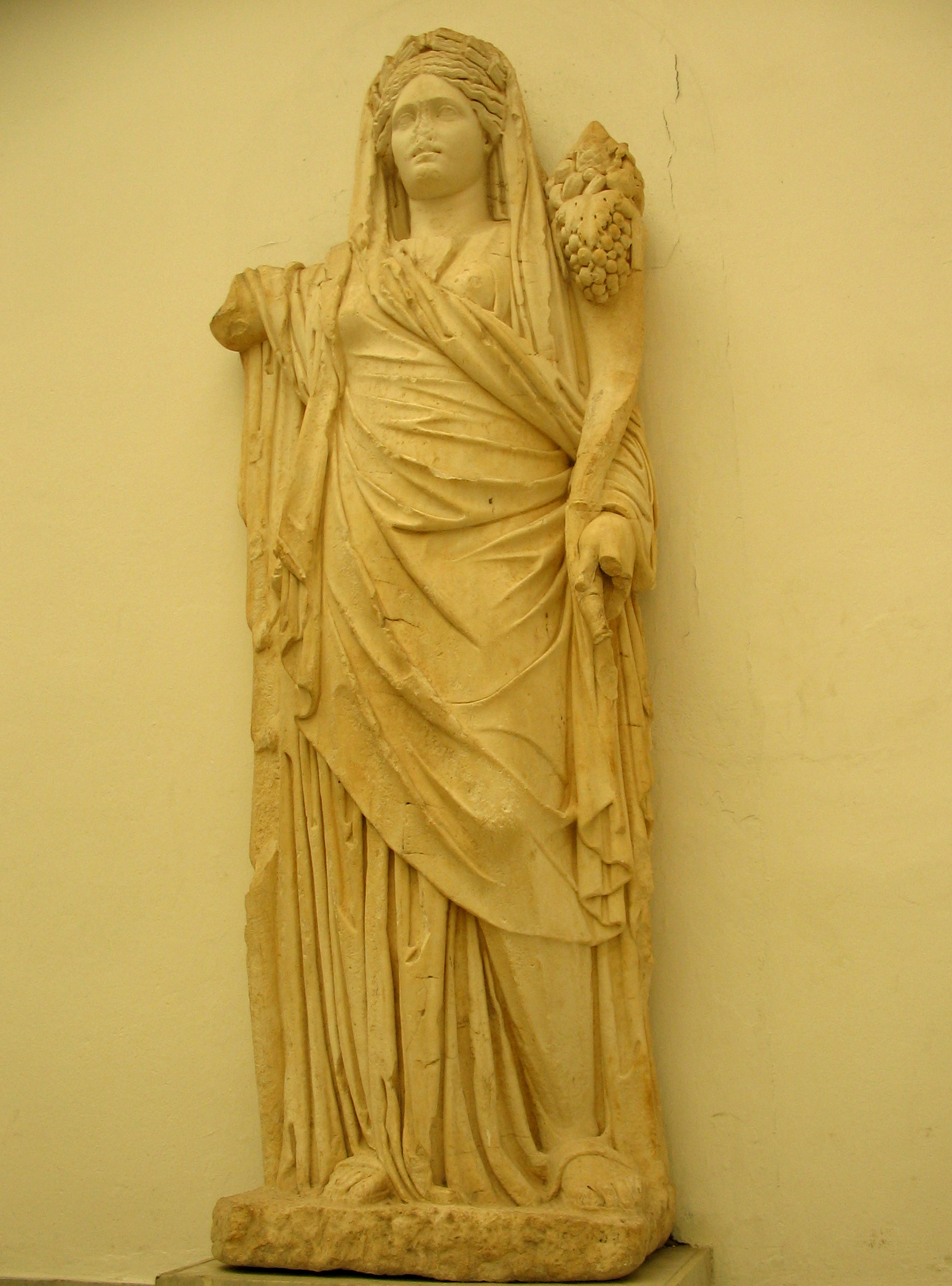
Concordia Pantea

The statue; dedicated by M. Umnidus is almost intact except that the right arm is broken at the elbow. It is made of white marble and stands 2.25 m high. The goddess is heavily draped; in her left hand she holds a cornucopia, while the right hand once held a staff, the lower part of which—touching the drapery—survives for 0.65 m. The upper part, which projected away from the body, was secured by tenons whose remains are still visible. The head is veiled and crowned with ears of grain. The workmanship is heavy, with many imperfections; the most noticeable is the insufficient length of the right arm, from elbow to shoulder.

The goddess Concordia was frequently worshipped in Africa. However, to our knowledge, no other example of a cult of Concordia Panthea is known elsewhere. The transformation of this deity into a Panthean goddess is, nevertheless, not surprising: it is simply one particular instance of the broader movement that, in Roman Africa during the second century AD, tended to produce a form of syncretism dominated by ideas of fertility and abundance.

==== Genius of Auguste ====
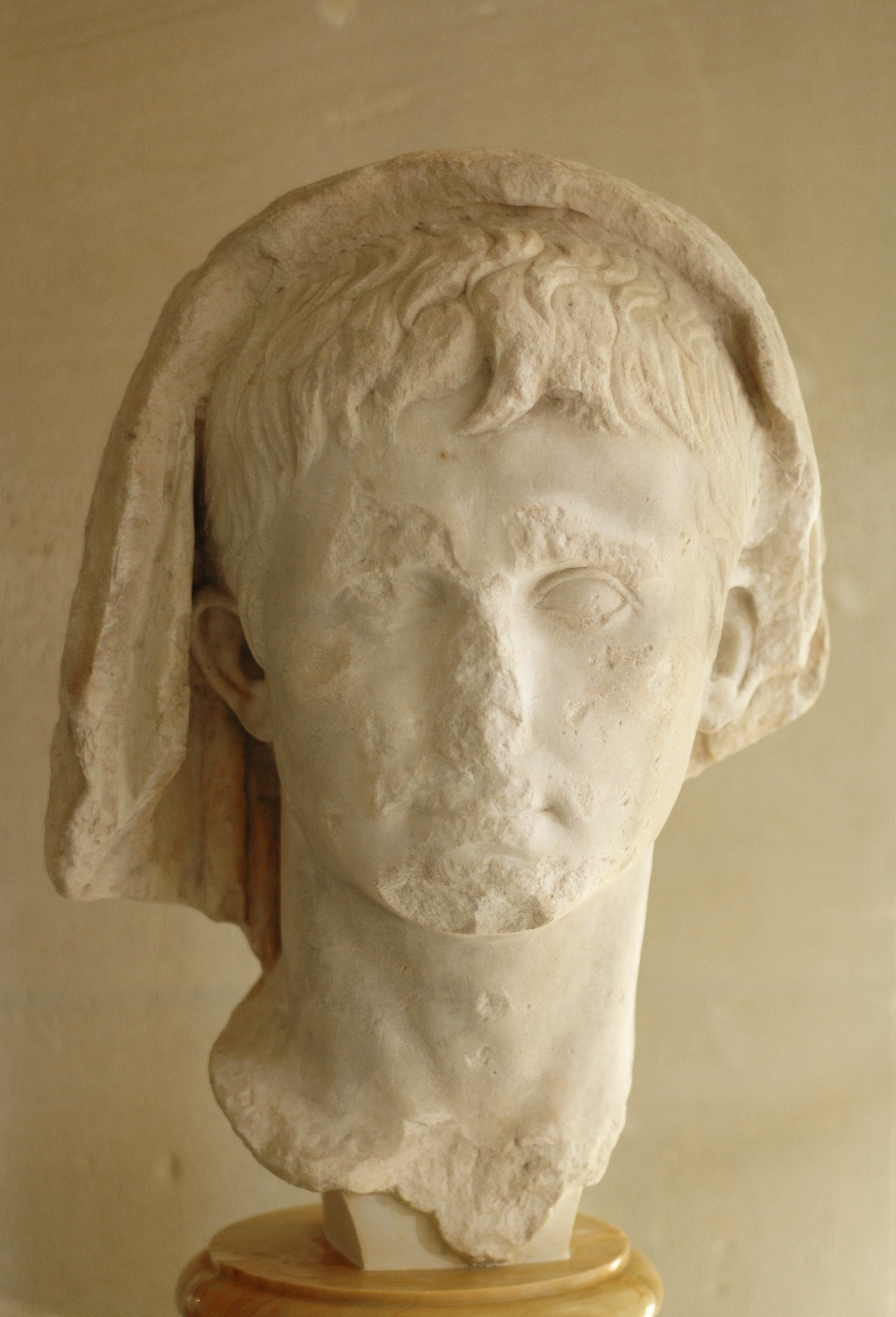
Genius of Auguste

the Genius of Augustus was represented there, as customary, with the features of the prince, dressed as a sacrificer, his head veiled by the toga. The sanctuary was therefore dedicated to the cult of the emperor's Genius—specifically the Genius of the living emperor. It is understandable that, when this cult was established on the forum of Gigthis, it was placed under the patronage of the ruler from whom it originated. The head was brought back to Paris and displayed at the National Library.

=== Alexandrian cult ===
Several archaeological finds from Gigthis attest to the presence and importance of the Alexandrian cults of Serapis and Isis. A marble bas‑relief, now preserved in the Bardo Museum, originally adorned the front of a platform near the main temple. It consisted of figures carved in shallow rounded niches and included representations associated with Egyptian religion: a crocodile head, winged female figures, a woman identifiable as Isis by her characteristic coiffure and torch, and fragments possibly depicting Anubis. These elements confirm the explicitly Egyptian nature of the ensemble.

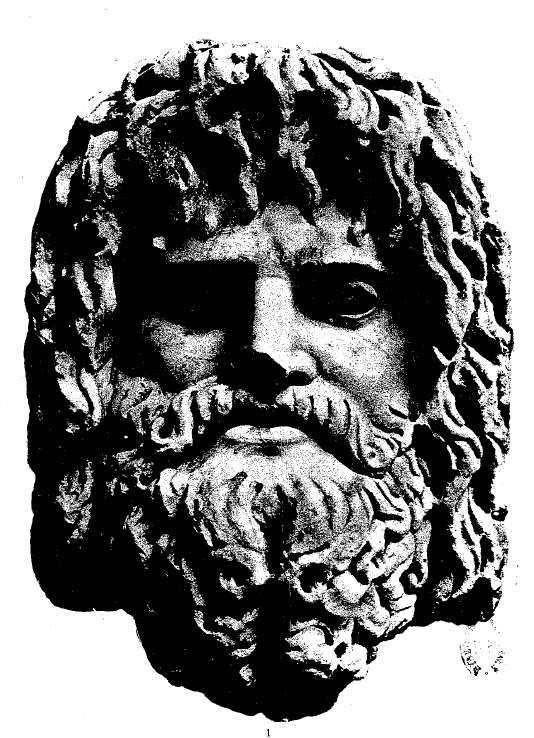
Head of Jupiter Serapis

Additional evidence comes from a sculpted head of Jupiter‑Serapis, belonging to the well‑known type created by the 4th‑century sculptor Bryaxis. Its stylistic features—long locks, shadowed eye sockets, and lightly incised pupils—suggest a date in the Antonine period. The original composition, showing Serapis seated with sceptre and Cerberus, implies that the Gigthis copy once stood on the base still visible before the temple.

A terracotta fragment from a boat‑shaped lamp, also housed in the Bardo Museum, further illustrates the cult's presence. Decorated with the bust of Serapis and the head of Isis flanked by uraei and lunar symbols, it belongs to a type known from Carthage and Pozzuoli and described by Apuleius as typical of Isis worship. It was likely part of the temple's ritual furnishings.

== Gallery ==
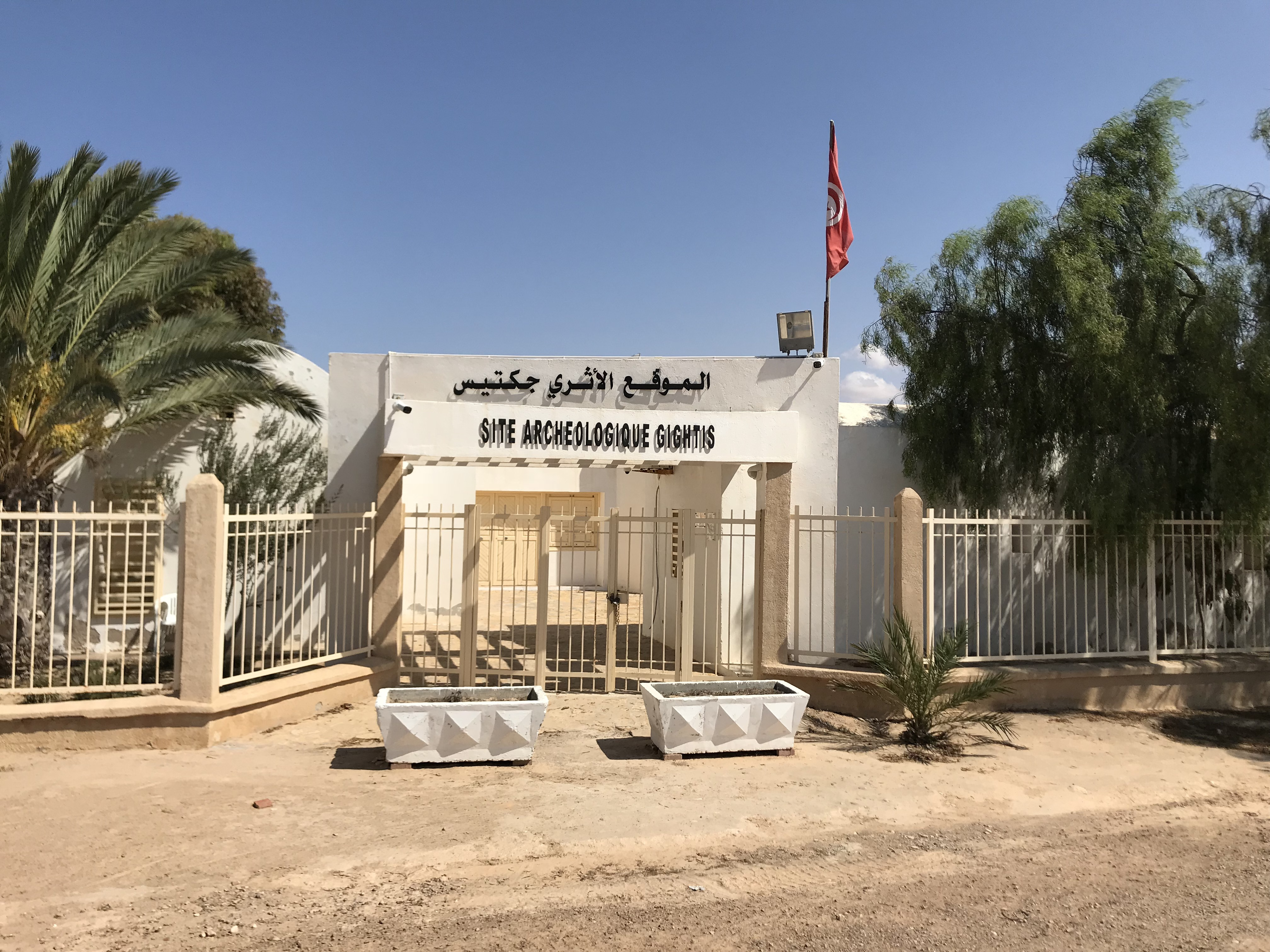
Entrance to the site

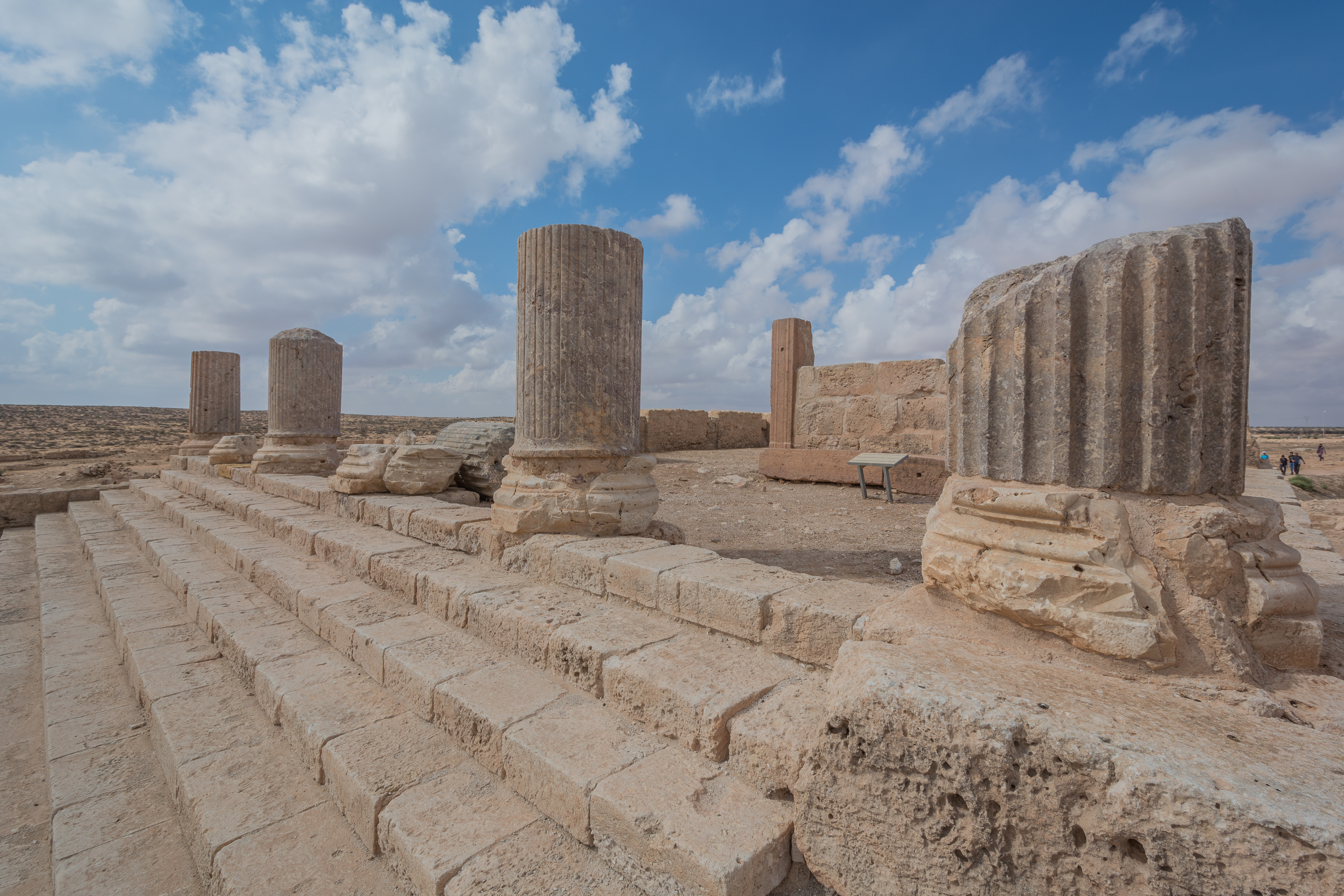
Ruins of the forum

== See also ==
- Roman Tunisia
- Punic people
- Antoninus Pius
- Leptis Magna
- Carthage

== Bibliography ==
- Guérin, Victor (1862). Voyage archéologique dans la Régence de Tunis. Vol. 1. Paris: Henri Plon. pp. 225–229.
- Reinach, Salomon; Babelon, Ernest (1886). "Fouilles exécutées a Gighthis et a Zian". Bulletin archéologique du Comité des travaux historiques et scientifiques (in French): 42–53.
- Gauckler, Paul (1901). "Séance de la comission de l'Afrique du Nord". Bulletin archéologique du Comité des travaux historiques et scientifiques: CCXXII–CCXXIII.
- Gauckler, Paul (1902). "Séance de la comission de l'Afrique du Nord". Bulletin archéologique du Comité des travaux historiques et scientifiques: CXXVI-CXXVIII & CLXXXVII-CXC.
- Constans, L. A. (1916). "Rapport sur une mission archéologique a Bou-ghara (Gigthis) (1914 et 1915)". Nouvelles archives des missions scientifiques et littéraires: 1–113.
- Constans, Leopold (1915). "Inscriptions de Gigthis (Tunisie) (suite)". Mélanges de l'École française de Rome (in French): 327–344.
- Merlin, Alfred; Poinssot, Louis. Guide du Musée du Bardo (Musée Alaoui.
- Cagnat, René (1917). "La ville antique de Gigthis, en Tunisie. L.-A. Constans, Gigthis, Étude d'histoire et d'archéologie sur un emporium de la petite Syrie". Journal des Savants (in French): 289–299.
- Constans, Léopold; Merlin, Alfred (1918). Leroux, Ernest (ed.). "Sépultures découvertes à Gigthis (Tunisie)". Bulletin archéologique du Comité des travaux historiques et scientifiques (in French). Paris: 124–133.
- Ben Taher, Sami (2004). "Quelques réflexions sur les autochtones de Gigthis à l'époque punique" (PDF). Reppal. 13. Institut National du patrimoine: 45–60.
- Grebien, Matthias (2016). "Das Macellum von Gigthis, eine Imitation der Trajansmärkte in Rom?". Sonderdruck.
- Ben Taher, Sami; Drine, Ali; Aouadi, Mekki (2024). "Fouilles stratigraphiques sous le forum romain de Gigthis : de l'étude des vestiges et du matériel céramique à l'essai d'histoire régionale". Antiquités africaines (in French). 60: 43–82.
- Benedetti, Ginevra (2024). "The Aedes Concordiae Pantheae Augustae and the "Pantheon" of Gigthis. A Possible Reading of CIL VIII 22692 (2nd c. CE)". ARYS. Antigüedad: Religiones y Sociedades (in English and Spanish). 22: 113.
- Trousset, Pol (1998). "Gigthis (Bou Grara)". Encyclopédie Berbère (in French): 3128–3134.
