= Listed buildings in Cowling, Craven =

Cowling is a civil parish in the county of North Yorkshire, England. It contains 38 listed buildings that are recorded in the National Heritage List for England. Of these, two are listed at Grade II*, the middle of the three grades, and the others are at Grade II, the lowest grade. The parish contains the village of Cowling and the surrounding countryside. Most of the listed buildings are farmhouses and farm buildings, houses and associated structures. The other listed buildings include milestones, a lime kiln, a former mill, a church, a former school and master's house, and a memorial cairn.

== Key ==
Grade	Criteria
II*	Particularly important buildings of more than special interest
II	Buildings of national importance and special interest

== Buildings ==
Name and location	Photograph	Date	Notes	Grade
Reedshaw Farmhouse and barn 53.87763°N 2.06837°W	—	1618	The barn is the older part, with the house dating from 1886. The buildings are in stone with a stone slate roof, and two storeys. In the house are double-chamfered mullion windows, with some mullions missing, and hood moulds in the ground floor. The doorways in the barn have chamfered surrounds.	II
Crag End Farmhouse; 53.88761°N 2.02273°W		Early 17th century (possible)	The farmhouse is in stone with a stone slate roof, two storeys and two bays. The doorway has a Tudor arch and moulded jambs and head. The windows are double chamfered and mullioned, one also with a transom, and they have hood moulds.	II
Former inn, Stott Fold Farm; 53.89622°N 2.05274°W	—	Early 17th century (probable)	Possibly a fragment from a former inn, later an outbuilding, in stone. It contains two cart entries, and a deeply recessed two-light double-chamfered stone mullioned window.	II
Lower Stone Head; 53.88499°N 2.07723°W	—	17th century (probable)	A farmhouse, later a private house, in stone with a stone slate roof. There are two storeys and two bays. In the left bay is a two-storey porch with coped gables and kneelers, containing a doorway with a moulded surround and a Tudor arch. On the front is a single cusped light in the ground floor and paired round-headed lights above, over which is an inscription. In the ground floor of the house are double-chamfered mullioned windows with hood moulds, and in the upper floor are square mullioned windows.	II
Lower Summer House; 53.87888°N 2.05314°W		Mid 17th century (probable)	The house is in stone with a stone slate roof and two storeys. The windows are double-chamfered and mullioned, and over the ground floor windows on the south front is a string course forming a hood mould. In the east gable end is a blocked doorway with a Tudor arched head.	II
Barns north of Lower Summer House; 53.87921°N 2.05360°W	—	17th century (probable)	The two barns are end to end, in stone, with a stone slate roof. They contain doorways with chamfered surrounds, an elliptical-arch cart entry and vents.	II
Thornesfield Farmhouse and barn 53.89022°N 2.05098°W	—	Mid to late 17th century	The farmhouse and attached barn are in stone, the house has a stone slate roof, and the roof of the barn is in asbestos. The house has two storeys, two bays, and a continuous rear outshut. On the front is a porch with gables and kneelers, and the doorway has a chamfered surround and a triangular head. There is another doorway to the left, and the other openings are double-chamfered and mullioned windows, those in the ground floor with hood moulds. The barn has quoins, outshuts, and a doorway with a chamfered surround.	II
Town End Farmhouse; 53.88336°N 2.05156°W	—	Mid to late 17th century (probable)	The farmhouse is in stone with a stone slate roof, two storeys and three bays. On the front is a porch containing a doorway with an elliptical head and a chamfered surround, above which is a chamfered niche. The windows are double-chamfered and mullioned, those in the ground floor with hood moulds.	II
The Old Dairy; 53.88086°N 2.07228°W	—	1675	Originally a barn, in Lower Bawes Edge Farm, it is in stone with a stone slate roof. A door near one corner has a doorway with a moulded surround and a Tudor arched head, and in the spandrels are the date, swords, a heart and a shield. The lintel has a long illegible inscription. The cart entry has a spiral carving at the foot of one jamb, and a corbel carved as a human face.	II
Lower Bawes Edge Farmhouse; 53.88108°N 2.07238°W		Late 17th century (probable)	The farmhouse is in stone with a stone slate roof and two storeys. It contains double-chamfered stone mullioned windows, and a doorway with a deep lintel.	II
Norwood Farmhouse; 53.90071°N 2.04373°W	—	Late 17th century (probable)	The farmhouse, later a private house, has a rendered front, and a stone slate roof, hipped towards the lane. There are two storeys and three bays. The windows are double-chamfered and mullioned, those in the ground floor with hood moulds.	II
Skythorns Farmhouse; 53.89566°N 2.06765°W	—	Late 17th century	The farmhouse, which has been altered, is in stone with a stone slate roof, and has two storeys. A five-light double-chamfered stone mullioned window remains, and at the rear is a small two-light chamfered window.	II
Stott Fold Farmhouse; 53.89660°N 2.05227°W	—	Late 17th century (probable)	The farmhouse is in stone with a stone slate roof, two storeys and three bays. Two ground floor windows have double-chamfered stone mullions, and the other windows have square mullions.	II
Moor View; 53.89413°N 2.03099°W	—	1677	The farmhouse is in stone with a stone slate roof, two storeys and five bays. In the centre is a two-storey gabled porch with an ornamental finial, containing a doorway with a chamfered surround and an embattled lintel, over which is an illegible inscription. In the upper floor in the second bay is a loading door converted into a window with an initialled and dated lintel. To the right of the porch is a string course, and the windows are double-chamfered and mullioned, with some mullions missing.	II
Stone Head; 53.88524°N 2.07925°W		1690 or earlier	The house is in stone with a stone slate roof and two tall storeys. At the left end is a gabled porch with initials over the doorway, and to the right is another doorway. In the ground floor are two chamfered mullioned and transomed windows, and the upper floor contains three double-chamfered mullioned windows. At the rear is an outshut with a round-headed window.	II
Lumb Mill House; 53.89648°N 2.02169°W	—	1696	The house is in stone with a stone slate roof. There are two storeys and three bays, and an outshut in the centre of the front facing the road. In the outshut is a doorway with a moulded surround and an initialled and dated lintel. The windows are chamfered, some with mullions, and at the rear a string course forms a hood mould over the ground floor windows.	II
Long Hill End Farmhouse; 53.87672°N 2.03998°W		1699	The farmhouse is in stone, and has a stone slate roof with gable coping and kneelers. There are two storeys and two bays. To the left is an enclosed porch with kneelers, containing a doorway with a chamfered surround and a triangular head. The lintel is initialled and dated, and above it is a dated and initialled plaque. Throughout, there are double-chamfered mullioned windows, those in the ground floor with hood moulds.	II
Long Croft and barn 53.89170°N 2.04807°W	—	c. 1700 (probable)	The farmhouse and attached barn are in stone with quoins and a stone slate roof. The house has two storeys and attics, three bays, and a gabled cross-wing projecting at the rear. In the centre is a two-storey porch, the upper storey jettied over a moulded string course. It contains a doorway with a chamfered surround, and above it is a double-chamfered window with five stepped lights and a hood mould. The other windows are chamfered with mullions.	II*
The Stubbings; 53.89184°N 2.05948°W		1700 (probable)	The farmhouse, now a ruin, is in stone with two storeys and two bays. In each floor are double-chamfered mullioned windows, and over the ground floor windows is a string course forming a hood mould. There are two doorways, one with a chamfered surround. An extension contains massive jambs to a cart entry, one of which has initials and the date.	II
Bank View and Rockwood; 53.88957°N 2.05226°W		Late 17th or early 18th century	A farmhouse and cottages, later used for other purposes, then converted into two houses. They are in stone with a stone slate roof and two storeys. Over part of the ground floor is a string course, and the windows are double-chamfered and mullioned, with some mullions missing.	II
Lower Windhill Farmhouse; 53.89283°N 2.06137°W	—	Late 17th or early 18th century	The farmhouse is in stone with a stone slate roof and two storeys. In the ground floor are two double-chamfered stone mullioned windows, one with a hood mould, and the upper floor contains four modern casement windows with chamfered surrounds. There are two doorways, one with a plain surround, and the other blocked, with a deep lintel.	II
Gamsgill; 53.89160°N 2.04172°W	—	1707 (probable)	The farmhouse is in stone, pebbledashed at the rear, with quoins and a stone slate roof with coping and kneelers. There are two storeys and two bays. On the front are two doorways, and the windows are square, with moulded surrounds and chamfered mullions.	II
Milestone at junction with Lane Ends Lane; 53.89601°N 2.02845°W		18th century	The milestone is to the south of the junction of Carr Head Lane with Lane Ends Lane. The stone stands against a wall, on the east side is inscribed a pointing hand and the distance to Settle, and on the west side is the defaced name of Haworth.	II
Carr Head Hall; 53.89476°N 2.03948°W		1750s (probable)	A large house in stone on a plinth, with rusticated quoins, a floor band, a cornice, and a hipped slate roof. There are two storeys, and the south front has five bays. In the centre is a doorway with Doric pilasters, rosettes and triglyphs, and a pediment The east front has five bays, the middle three bays canted out, and the north front contains a Doric porch, distyle in antis. The windows are sashes in architraves.	II*
Over House Farmhouse; 53.89874°N 2.05669°W	—	1764 and earlier	The house is in stone with a stone slate roof, two storeys and three bays. Over the porch is an ornamental initialled datestone. In the ground floor are large square mullioned windows, with some mullions missing, and the upper floor contains double-chamfered mullioned windows, with some missing mullions.	II
Coach house, Carr Head Hall; 53.89432°N 2.03998°W	—	Late 18th century (probable)	The coach house, later a private house, is in stone with a hipped stone slate roof. There are two storeys and a symmetrical front of three bays. In the centre is a pediment surmounted by a small bellcote, and the windows have three lights and square mullions.	II
Chapel House; 53.89616°N 2.05526°W	—	Late 18th century	Originally a minister's house, it is in stone with quoins, and a stone slate roof with kneelers. There are two storeys and two bays. The doorway has a plain surround, and the windows are square, recessed and mullioned.	II
Lime kiln 53.89327°N 2.03748°W		Late 18th century (probable)	The lime kiln is in stone and set into a steep slope. There is a semicircular plan, with an elliptical-headed entrance about 1.5 metres (4 ft 11 in) high, and with a total height of about 4 metres (13 ft). Above the entrance is a pointed relieving arch.	II
Lower Coppy Farmhouse and barn 53.86438°N 2.06958°W	—	Late 18th century	The farmhouse and attached barn are in stone, with quoins, stone slate roofs, and two storeys. The house has two bays, and contains a doorway with a flush surround and sash windows. The barn projects on the right and has an east aisle and a central segmental-headed cart entry. It contains doorways, windows, loft openings and vents.	II
Lumb Ghyll; 53.89629°N 2.02021°W	—	Late 18th century (probable)	A mill, later a house, in stone with a stone slate roof. There are two storeys, four bays, and a lower rear wing. Most of the windows had square mullions and three lights, but most mullions are missing. In the gable end is a small Venetian window.	II
Higher Stone Head Farmhouse; 53.88702°N 2.07672°W		c. 1800 (probable)	The farmhouse is in stone with a stone slate roof. There are two storeys and three bays. It contains recessed windows with square mullions.	II
Summerhouse, Carr Head Hall; 53.89460°N 2.04095°W	—	Late 18th or early 19th century (probable)	The summerhouse in the garden of the hall is in stone, with squared quoins, and a hipped stone slate roof. It contains a round-headed doorway with rusticated voussoirs, and lunette windows. On the apex of the roof is a crocketed finial.	II
Holy Trinity Church; 53.88410°N 2.04993°W		1844–45	The church, designed by R. D. Chantrell in Perpendicular style, is built in stone with a slate roof. It consists of a nave, north and south aisles, a chancel and a west tower. The tower has two stages, diagonal buttresses, a south doorway with a moulded arch, two-light bell openings, and an embattled parapet with corner crocketed pinnacles.	II
Milestone near Hey Farm; 53.88210°N 2.06469°W		19th century	The milepost is on the south side of the A6068 road. It is in cast iron, and has a triangular plan and a curved top. On the top is inscribed "Blackburn Addingham and Cocking End Road" and "Cowling", on the left side are the distances to Colne and Blackburn, and on the right side the distances to Keighley, Addingham and Ilkley.	II
Milestone near New Hall Farm; 53.89375°N 2.02412°W		19th century	The milepost is on the south side of the A6068 road. It is in cast iron, and has a triangular plan and a curved top. On the top is inscribed "Blackburn Addingham and Cocking End Road" and "Sutton", on the left side are the distances to Colne and Blackburn, and on the right side the distances to Keighley and Addingham.	II
Old Carr Head Farmhouse; 53.89751°N 2.03978°W		19th century	The farmhouse is in rendered stone, with rusticated quoins, a string course, and a stone slate roof, the gables with armorial plaques and spike finials. There are two storeys and four bays, the outer bays gabled and forming cross-wings. The two doorways have Tudor arched heads, and the windows have double-chamfered surrounds.	II
The Old Vicarage and attached hall 53.88356°N 2.05018°W	—	1884	Originally a Sunday school and schoolmaster's house, it is in stone with quoins and stone slate roofs. The house has two storeys and two bays. In the centre is a Tudor arched doorway, the windows have three lights with chamfered mullions, and all the openings have hood moulds. The former schoolroom to the left has a single storey and similar windows.	II
Snowden Memorial; 53.86946°N 2.06345°W		1937	A memorial cairn to Philip Snowden, a local and national politician. It is in mortared sandstone, and has a rectangular section. On the cairn is an inscribed black stone tablet. The ashes of Philip Snowden and his wife, Ethel, are buried in the cairn.	II
