= Holy Trinity Church, Cowling =

Church in Cowling, North Yorkshire, England

Coordinates: 53.8841°N 2.0500°W

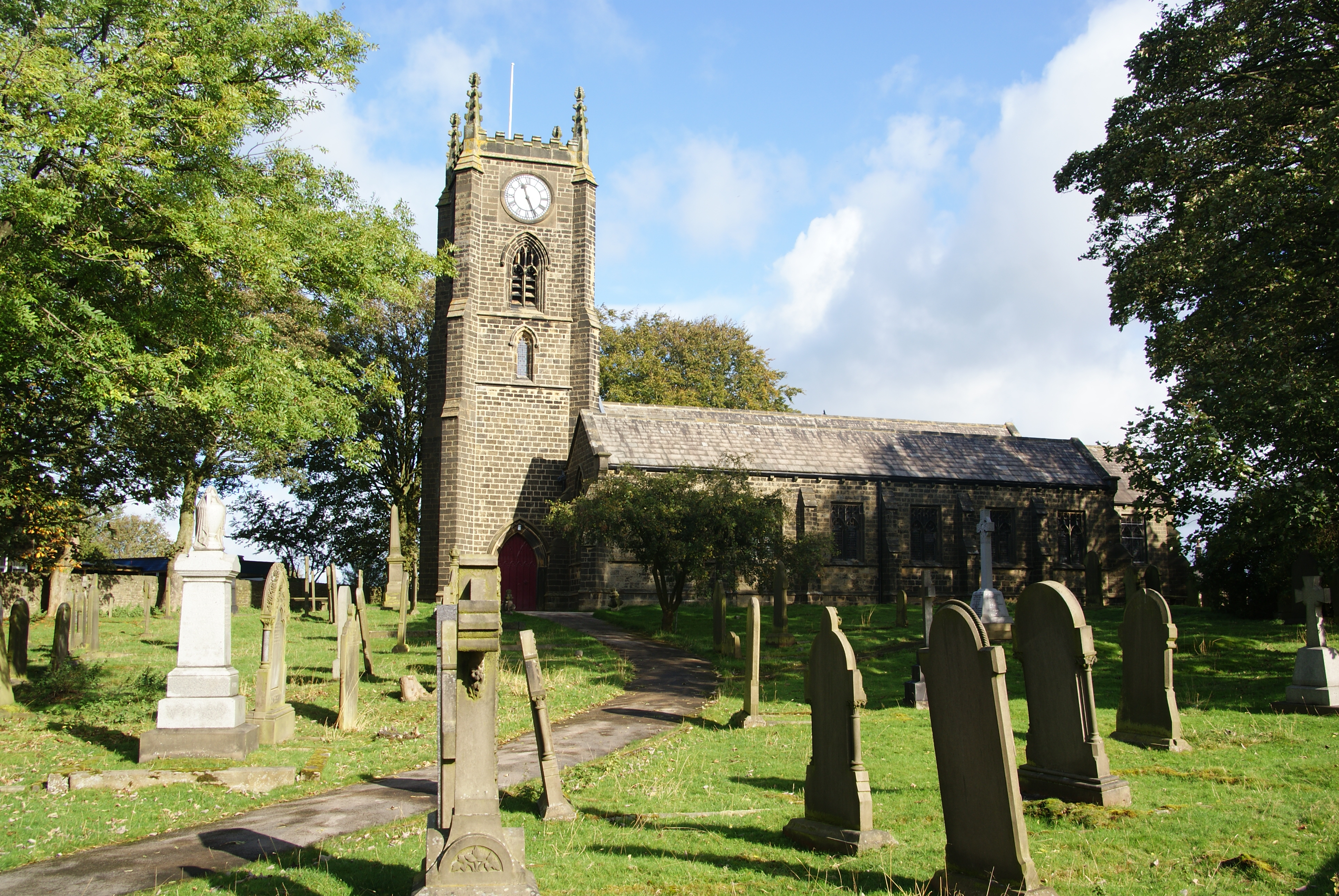
The church, in 2011

Holy Trinity Church is the parish church of Cowling, a village in North Yorkshire, in England.

Cowling lay in the parish of St Andrew's Church, Kildwick until September 1845. A church had just been completed, in the Perpendicular style, designed by R. D. Chantrell. It cost a total of just under £2,000, and soon after completion was described as "a handsome structure, on a good site, and forms a very pleasing object". In 1956, new stalls were crafted, by the workshop of Robert Thompson. It was Grade II listed in 1984.

The church is built of stone, with a slate roof. It consists of a nave, north and south aisles, a chancel and a west tower. The tower has two stages, diagonal buttresses, a south doorway with a moulded arch, two-light bell openings, and an embattled parapet with corner crocketed pinnacles. It originally had a west gallery, which was later removed.

== See also ==
- Listed buildings in Cowling, Craven
