= Long Croft =

Historic house in Cowling, North Yorkshire, England

Coordinates: 53°53′30″N 2°02′53″W

Long Croft is a historic house in Cowling, a village in North Yorkshire, in England.

The building was constructed in about 1700 as a farmhouse. The farmhouse has a parlour cross-wing, a common feature further south, but in Craven only Long Croft and Halton West Auld Hall possess one. The building has an attached barn which is at least as old and may be earlier, although it has no readily-dated features. It was little altered over the following centuries, and due to this was Grade II* listed in 1984.

The farmhouse and barn are built of stone with quoins and a stone slate roof. The house has two storeys and attics, three bays, and a gabled cross-wing projecting at the rear. In the centre is a two-storey porch, the upper storey jettied over a moulded string course. It contains a doorway with a chamfered surround, and above it is a double-chamfered window with five stepped lights and a hood mould. The other windows are chamfered with mullions. Inside, there is a baffle entry, to the side of a large fireplace, and there is a similar fireplace in the kitchen. There is a spiral staircase built of stone, and repaired in places with slate. The roof has a king post truss, while the roof in the barn is queen post.

== See also ==
- Grade II* listed buildings in North Yorkshire (district)
- Listed buildings in Cowling, Craven
