= Ickornshaw Mill =

Historic watermill in Cowling, England

Coordinates: 53.8826°N 2.0530°W

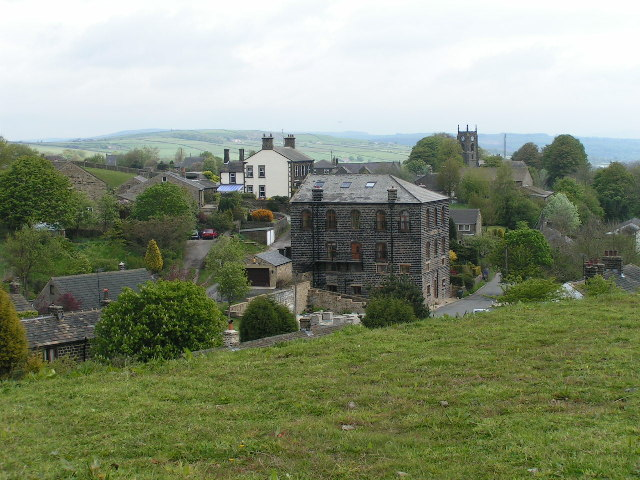
The mill, in 2005

Ickornshaw Mill is a historic watermill in Cowling, a village in North Yorkshire, in England.

The cotton mill was constructed in 1791 by John Dehane, a local clergyman, who had received a large inheritance. There was a pond at the rear which fed the waterwheel, but it was insufficient during periods of drought. In 1820, John Halstead bought the mill, and built a larger reservoir at Cowloughton Dam on Ickornshaw Moor, to feed the millpond. The dam burst in 1849, causing much damage but no deaths. The mill escaped damage and continued to operate, while the reservoir was not rebuilt.

The mill was largely destroyed in a fire in 1884, but was quickly rebuilt. Another fire in 1910 caused minor damage. By 1950, it had 200 looms, producing silk and rayon fibres.
