= Cowling, Craven =

Village and civil parish in North Yorkshire, England

Coordinates: 53°53′04″N 2°02′32″W

Cowling
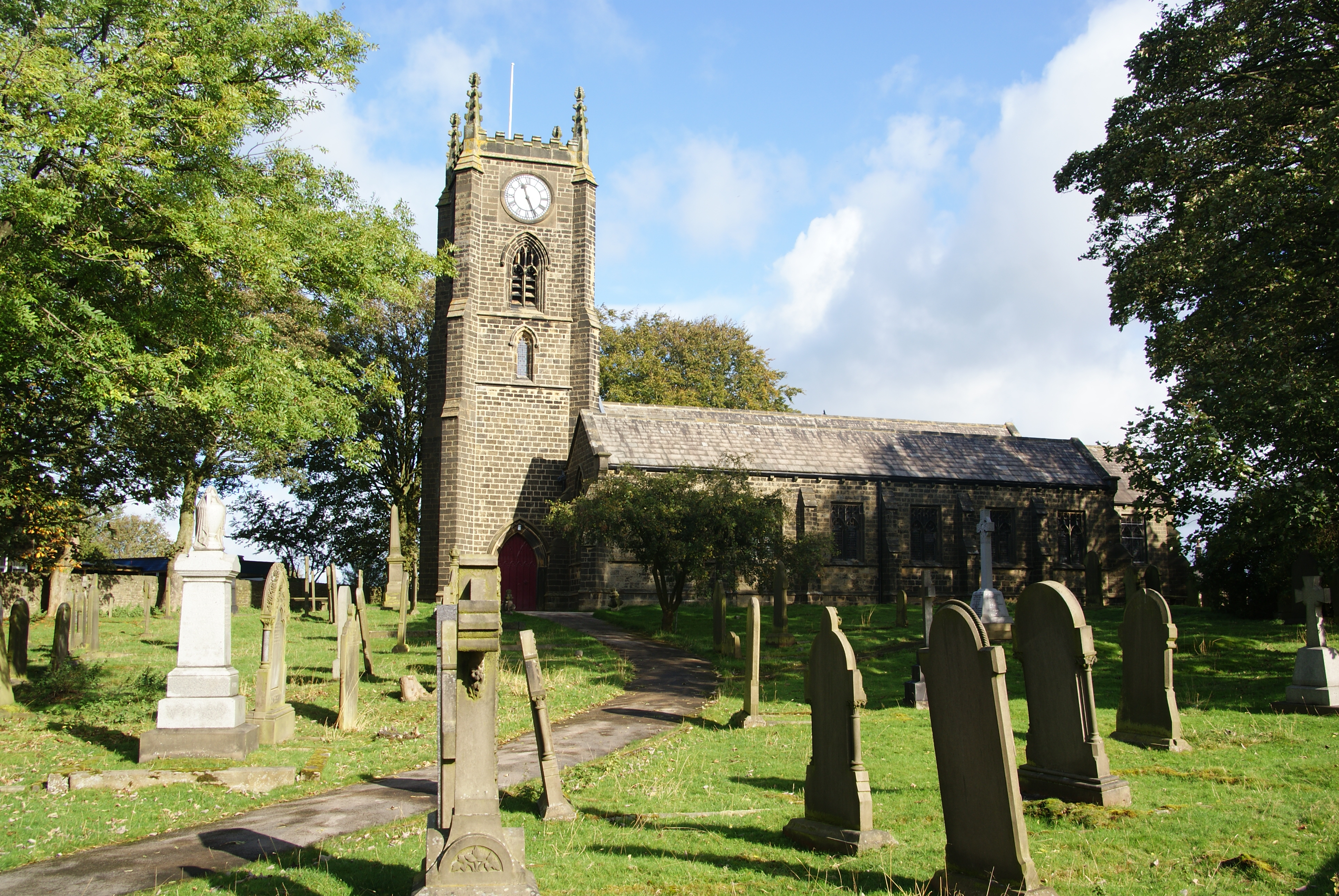
- Holy Trinity Church built in 1845

- Location within North Yorkshire
- Population: 2,355 (2011 census)
- OS grid reference: SD969429
- Civil parish: Cowling
- Unitary authority: North Yorkshire
- Ceremonial county: North Yorkshire
- Region: Yorkshire and the Humber
- Country: England
- Sovereign state: United Kingdom
- Post town: KEIGHLEY
- Postcode district: BD22
- Dialling code: 01535
- Police: North Yorkshire
- Fire: North Yorkshire
- Ambulance: Yorkshire
- UK Parliament: Skipton & Ripon

Cowling (/ˈkoʊlɪŋ/ COH-ling) is a village and civil parish in the county of North Yorkshire, England, bordering West Yorkshire and Lancashire.

Until 1974 it was part of the West Riding of Yorkshire. From 1974 to 2023 it was part of the Craven District, it is now administered by the unitary North Yorkshire Council.

The parish had a population of 2,355 in 2011.

== History ==
The village is Saxon in origin and is recorded in the Domesday Book as 'Collinge'. The name means Coll's people or tribe. At the time of the Norman conquest the main landowner was Gamel who had very large land holdings in Yorkshire. His name survives in Gamsgill on the northern edge of the village.

Several old farm buildings survive in the area around the village, most notably the grade II* listed Long Croft. There is also a small country house from the 1750s, Carr Head Hall.

Originally the village comprised three separate hamlets namely Ickornshaw, Middleton, Gill and Cowling Hill. It was only following the construction of the main Keighley to Colne road (A6068) and the building of large mills alongside the road that what is now regarded as the main village was constructed providing terraced cottage homes for the mill workers. The first mill was Ickornshaw Mill, completed in 1791. The older parts of the village faded in importance and as a result Holy Trinity Church and the primary school are located on what appears to be the outskirts of the village between Ickornshaw and Middleton, the centre of the village having moved since their construction.

The mills continued to operate and to provide the main source of local employment until the end of the 20th century but are now all closed down and their sites largely redeveloped for housing and the village hall. The village is now very much a dormitory village for those working in the surrounding towns of West Yorkshire and East Lancashire. It is the base for a licensed community radio station, Drystone Radio.

=== Famous people from Cowling ===
Philip Snowden, who served as Chancellor of the Exchequer in the first two Labour governments, was born in the village; when awarded a viscountcy in 1931, his full title was "Viscount Snowden, of Ickornshaw in the West Riding of Yorkshire". In the early 1930s, Snowden spoke in the local dialect of Cowling on a 78 rpm gramophone produced by the Yorkshire Dialect Society. Snowden's ashes were scattered on Ickornshaw Moor and there is a memorial cairn to Snowden to mark the fact that he "died in the love of his native land".

== See also ==
- Listed buildings in Cowling, Craven

== Gallery ==
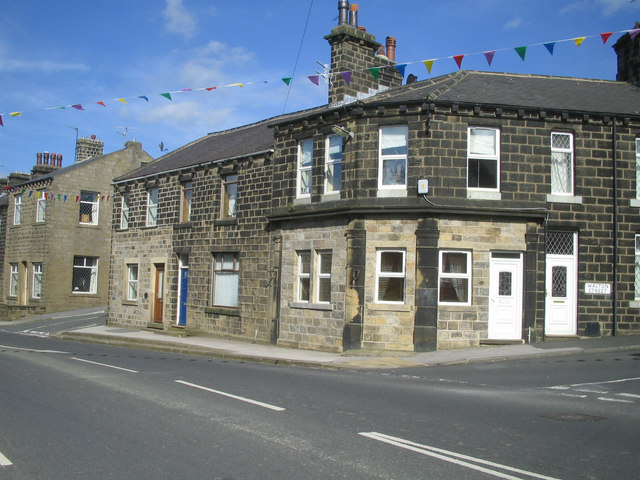
Former butcher's shop, Keighley Road, Cowling

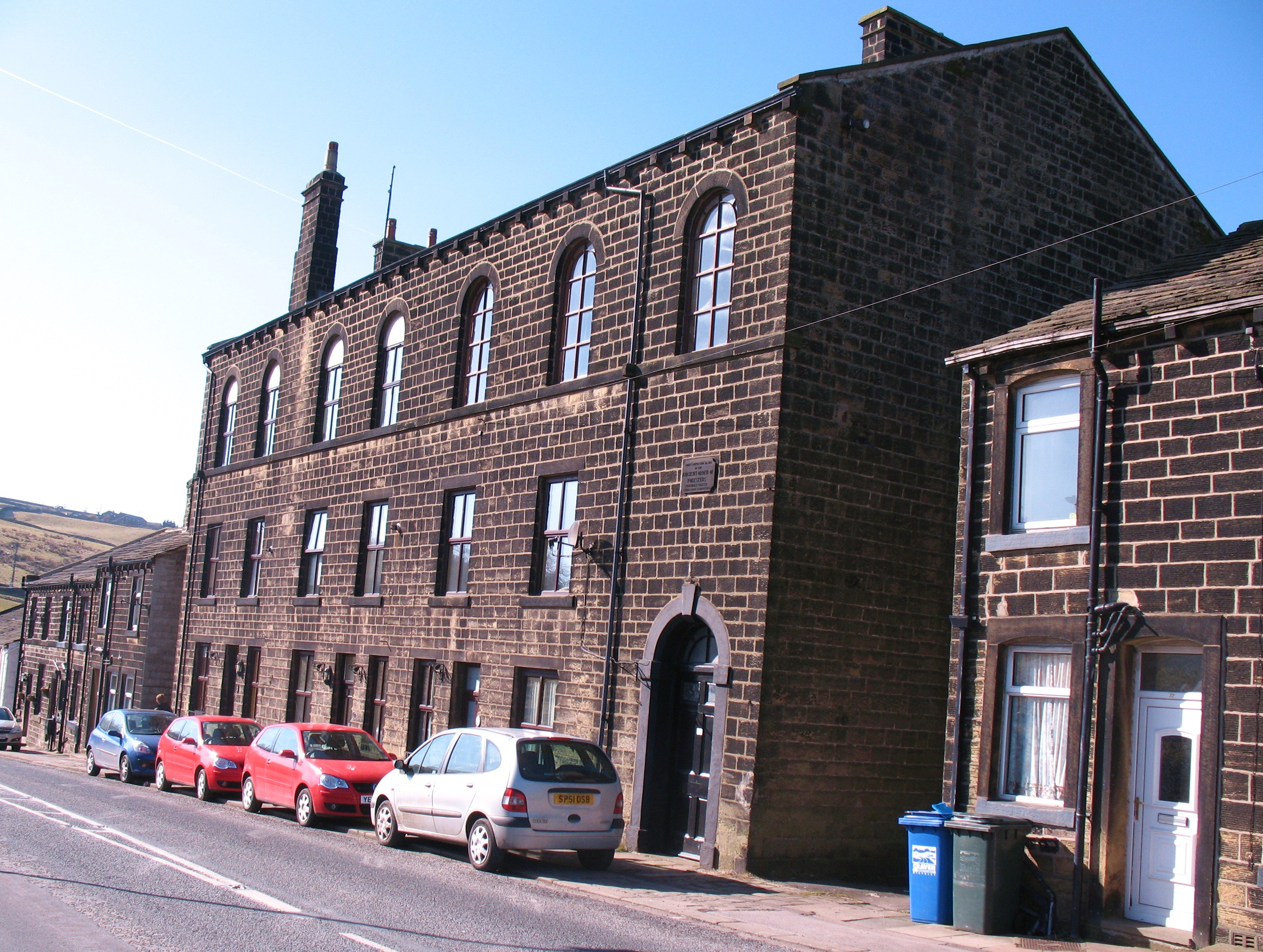
Cowling

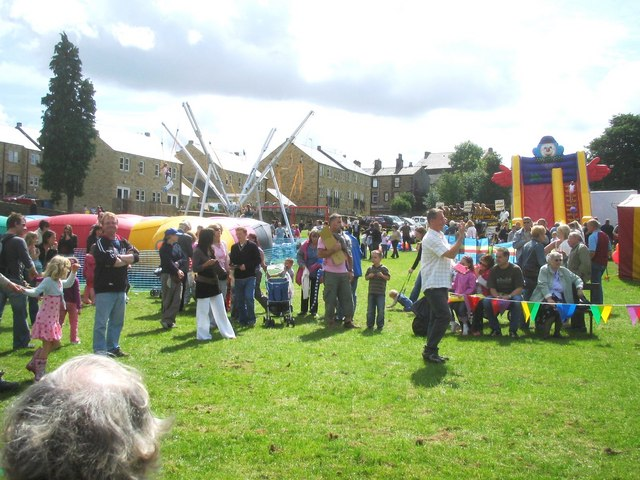
Cowling Gala, 2007

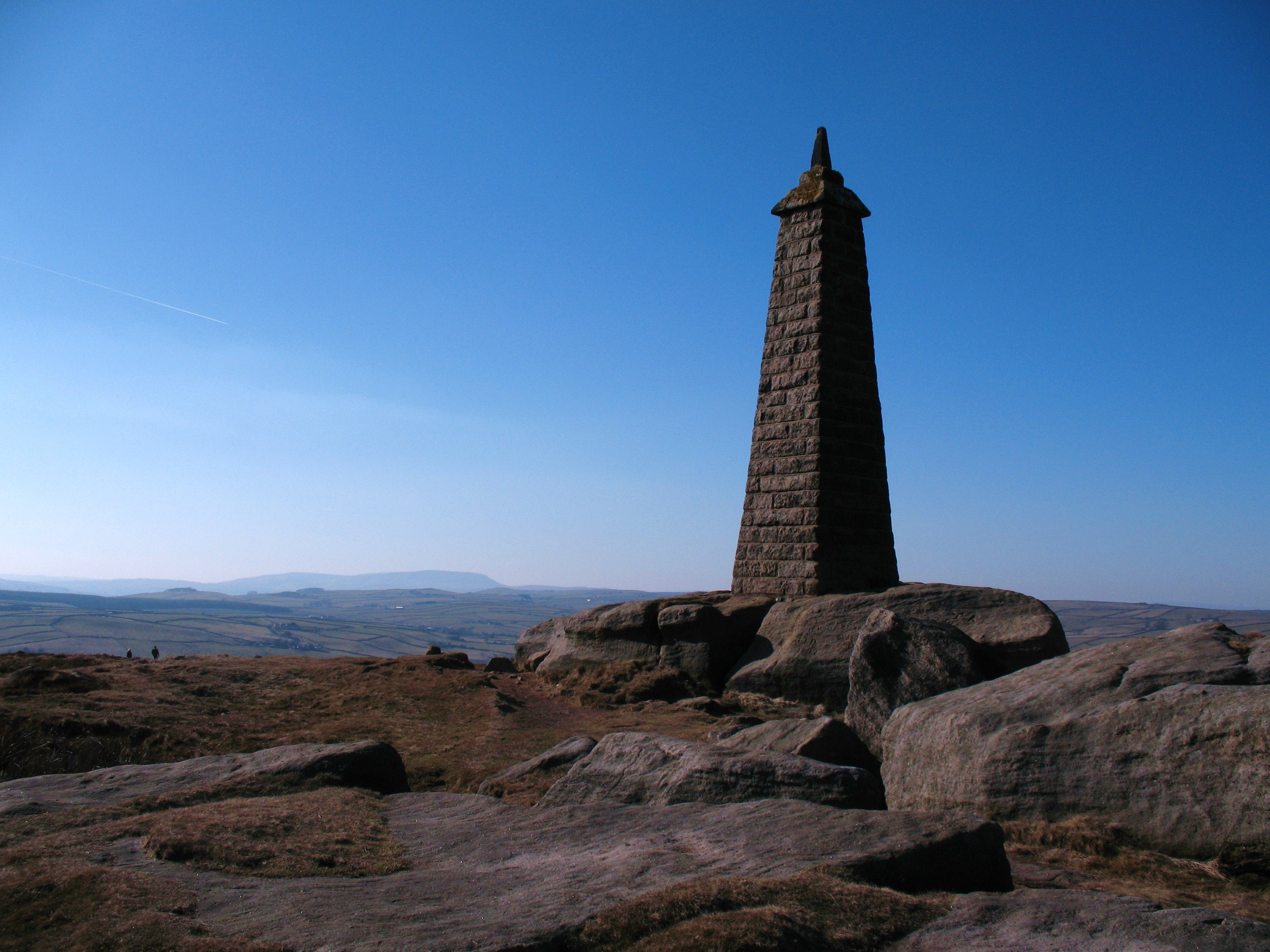
Wainman's Pinnacle, a stone obelisk near Cowling, often referred to as Cowling Pinnacle

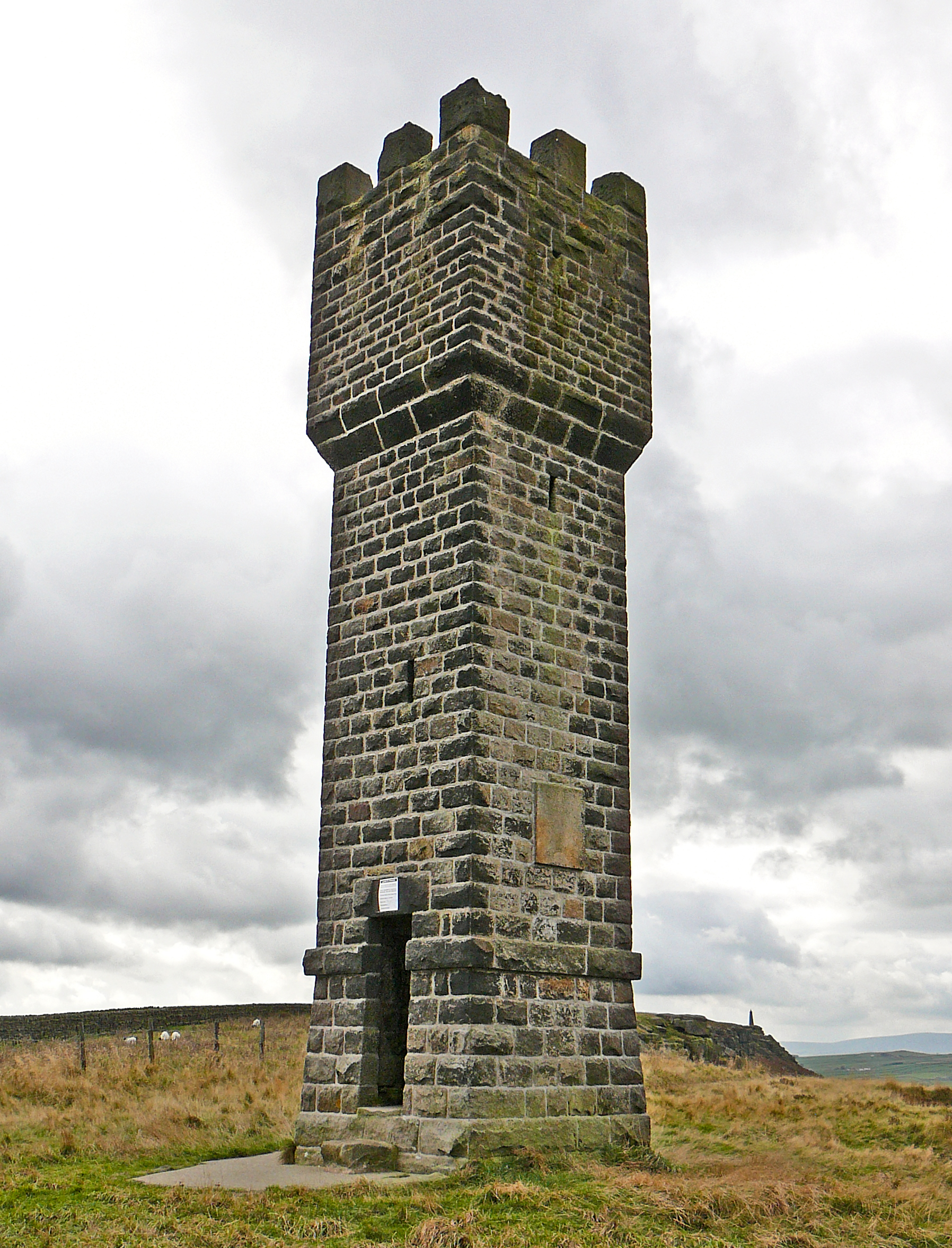
Lund's Tower, near Cowling
