= Distyle =

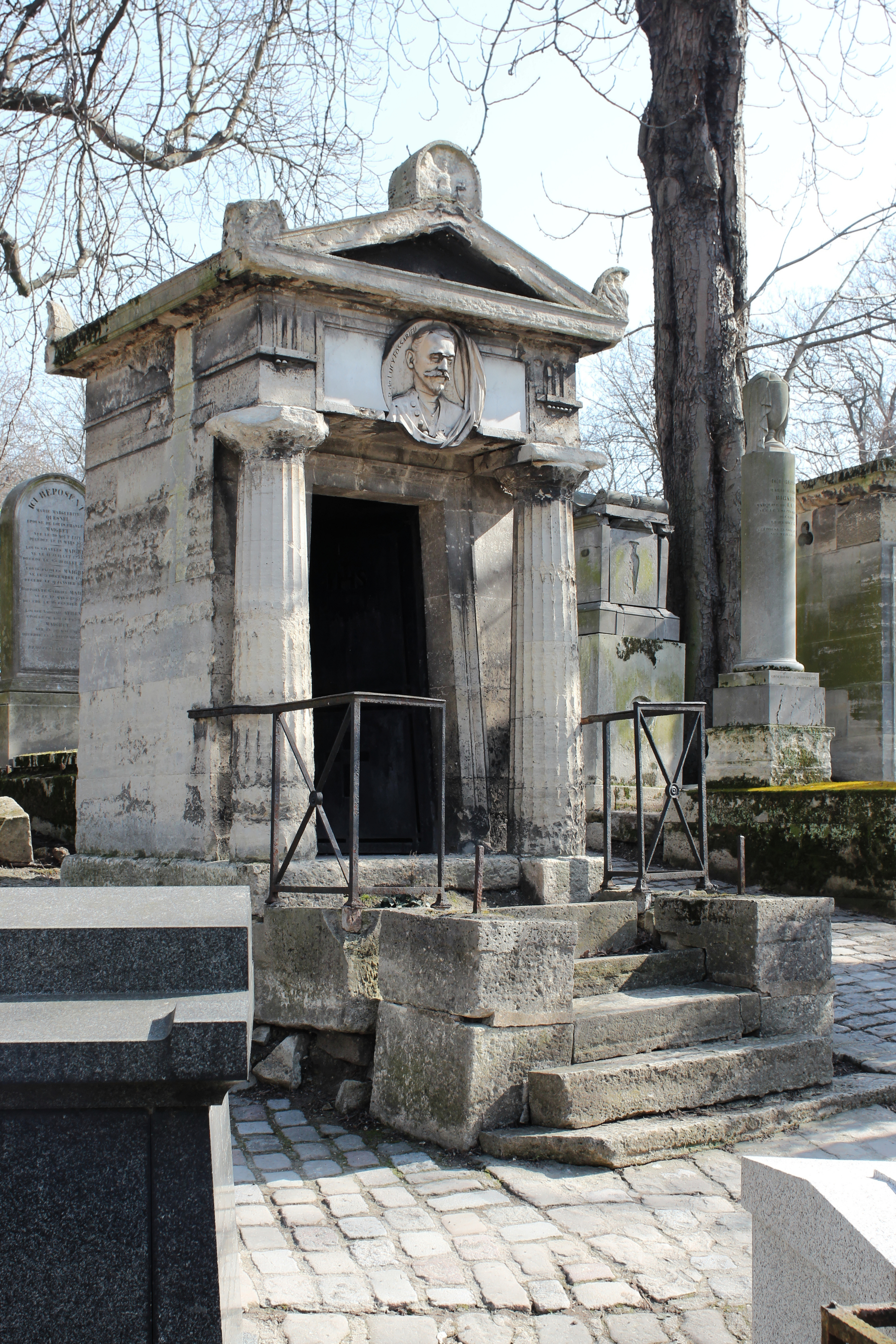
Neoclassical chapel shaped as a Roman distyle temple with Doric columns

In classical architecture, a distyle is a small temple-like structure with two columns to the sides of the entrance, forming a porch. By extension, a distyle can also mean a distyle in antis, the original design of the Greek temple, where two columns are set between two antae.

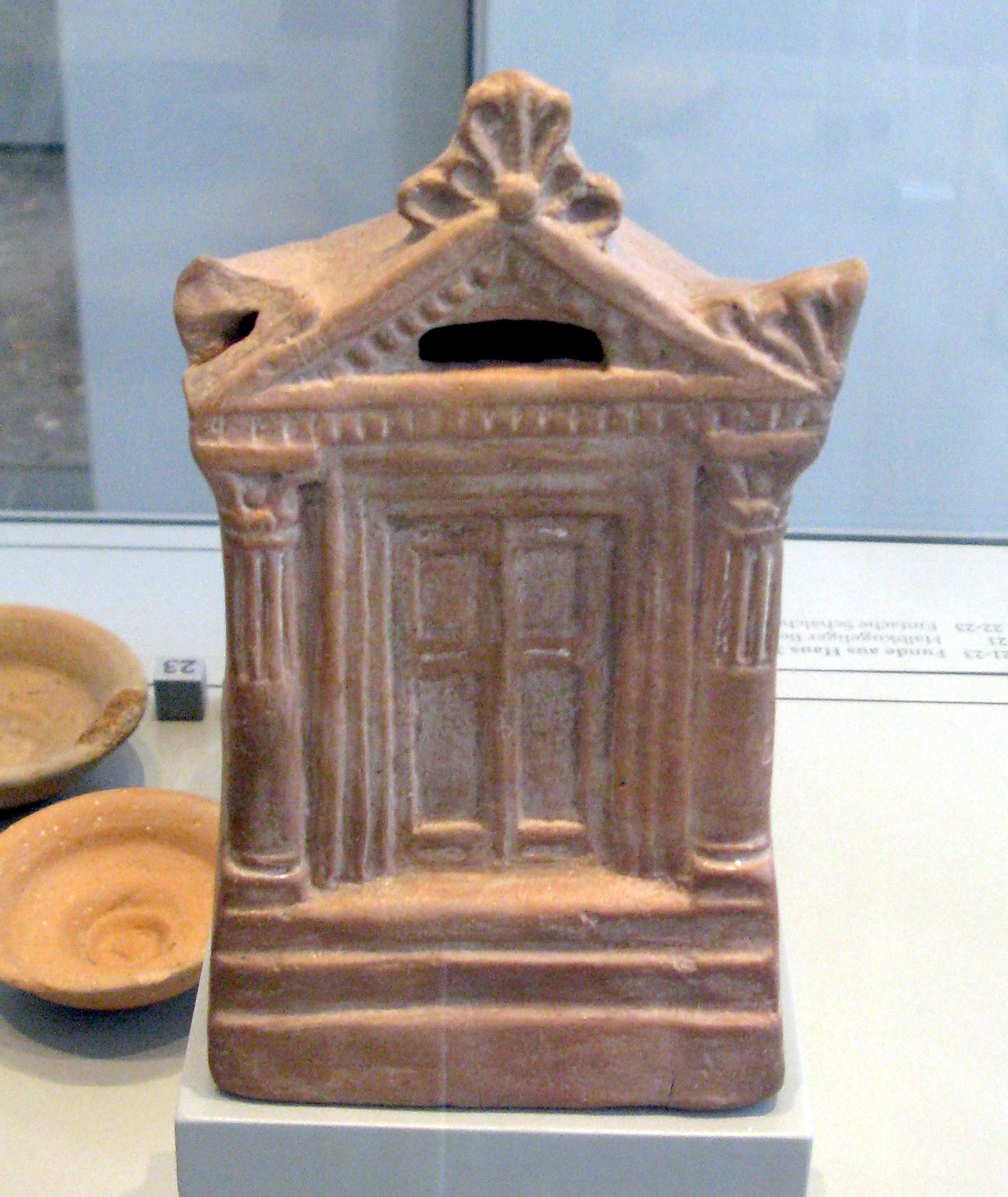
Hellenistic money box in the shape of a temple

== See also ==
- Prostyle
- Amphiprostyle
- Peristyle
