= List of places of worship in Craven =

This is a partial list of active, former and demolished places of worship in the former Craven District in North Yorkshire in England.

Most or all of Craven falls within the Archdeaconry of Richmond and Craven in the Church of England, the Skipton and Grassington circuit or the Airedale circuit in the Methodist Church, and the Keighley/Skipton deanery in the Roman Catholic Church.

== Airton-in-Craven ==
- Airton Friends' Meeting House
- Airton Wesleyan Methodist Chapel (now closed and in residential use): the chapel's Great War memorial plaque is now located in Kirby Malham St Michael's Church.

== Austwick ==
- Church of the Epiphany, Church of England

== Bentham ==
- The first Catholic church in Bentham was built in 1866.
- St Boniface Catholic Church.

== Bolton ==
- Bolton Abbey
- The Priory Church of St Mary and St Cuthbert, Bolton Abbey
- It is thought that there may have been a Saxon chapel on the site of the present Bolton Priory church.

== Bradley ==
- Bradley Methodist Chapel, formerly Bradley Primitive Methodist Chapel, built in 1897; its foundation stones were laid on 17 April 1997.
- South Brook Chapel, a Primitive Methodist chapel dating from 1835.

== Broughton ==
- The Anglican church is part of the Parish of Broughton, Marton and Thornton.

== Carleton-in-Craven ==
- Carleton in Craven Wesleyan Methodist Church. The electric lighting in the church was installed in memory of the scholars and members who gave their lives during World War I.
- Primitive Methodist Chapels: the "My Primitive Methodists" website notes the existence of two Primitive Methodist chapels in this village, one dating from 1861 and the other from 1902.
- St Mary the Virgin Parish Church

== Conistone ==
- St Mary's Church
- Former Methodist Church, now operated as a hostel used for conferences and retreats.

== Cononley ==
- Cononley Methodist Church
- St John's Church

The two churches are joined in a Local Ecumenical Partnership (LEP).

== Cross Hills ==
- South Craven Evangelical Church (SCEC), a member of the Fellowship of Independent Evangelical Churches.

== Draughton ==
- St Augustine's Church (Anglican), Low Lane, Draughton BD23 6DZ, one of the places of worship of Holy Trinity Church, Skipton.

== East Marton ==
- St Peter's Church in East Marton, formerly called Church Marton, part of the Parish of Broughton, Marton and Thornton.
- There was an earlier Saxon church in East Marton

== Embsay ==
- Bolton Priory church has its historical origins in an Augustinian priory founded at Embsay
- Embsay Methodist Church, Main Street. On 1 September 2021, Embsay Methodist Church became a class of St. Andrew's Church, Skipton. Under the Methodist Church of Great Britain's Constitutional Practice and Discipline (CPD), where the number of registered local church members falls below six over four successive quarters, the formal "local church" ceases to be recognised as such and is often treated as a "class" subject to the oversight of another Methodist Church or leader.
- St Mary the Virgin (Anglican), Kirk Lane, Embsay, BD23 6SE, part of the Benefice of Embsay with Eastby.

== Gargrave ==
- The parish church, dedicated to St Andrew, was built in 1521 and restored in 1852.
- There is thought to have been a church on the site long before this time.

== Giggleswick ==
- Church of St Alkelda
- An earlier church is believed to have existed on the site of St Alkelda's since Saxon times.
- Giggleswick School Chapel

== Glusburn ==
- All Saints Church, now a ruin. The church was erected in 1906 and closed on 1 January 1998.

== Grassington ==
- Grassington Congregational Church, Garrs Lane, a Grade II listed building dating from 1811.
- Grassington Methodist Chapel
- Grassington Primitive Methodist Chapel, opened in 1837, was part of the Grassington branch of the Primitive Methodist Church's Silsden circuit

Grassington village has never had a parish church (Church of England).

== Ingleton ==
- St Mary's Parish Church
- Ingleton Evangelical Church
- Ingleton Methodist Chapel

== Kettlewell ==
- A mediaeval church existed in Kettlewell
- St Mary's Church, Kettlewell

== Kildwick ==
- St Andrew's Church
- An earlier Anglo-Saxon church
- Kildwick, Sutton Baptist Chapel

== Kirkby Malham ==
- St Michael's Church

== Lawkland ==
- A permanent Catholic chaplaincy served by the Benedictines was established at Lawkland Hall around 1650.

== Lothersdale ==
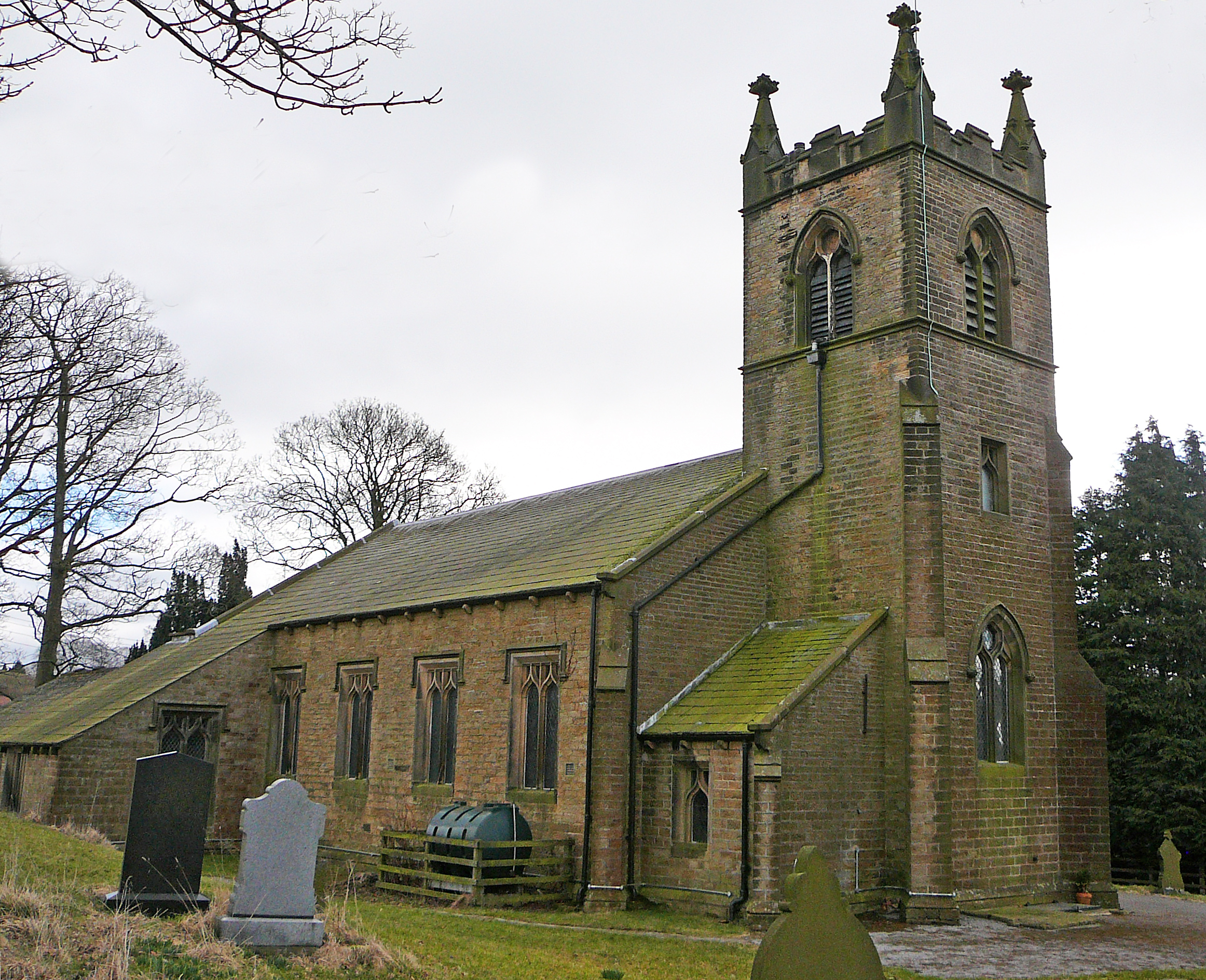
Christ Church, Lothersdale

- Christ Church

== Malham-in-Craven ==
- Malham Methodist Church and Hope Garden. The church has been a class of Bradley Methodist Church since 2022 (see Embsay above re: "classes" in the Methodist Church).
- St Helen's Chapel, a chapel of ease, was an ancient religious foundation mentioned in monastic charters from the twelfth century. It was demolished during the reformation. Archaeological digs at the site have been supported by the Ingleborough Archaeology Group.

== Settle ==
- Holy Ascension Parish Church, designed by Thomas Rickman, consecrated in 1838.
- Kingdom Hall of Jehovah's Witnesses, Kirkgate.
- Quaker Meeting House, Kirkgate
- Settle Christian Fellowship
- St John's Methodist Church
- St Mary and St Michael Catholic Church

== Skipton ==
- Part of Ermysted's Grammar School, Gargrave Road, Skipton, was originally a Knights Hospitallers' chapel.
- Skipton Castle contains the ruins of a 12th-century chapel
- Skipton Parish Church
- Skipton Baptist Church, Otley Road, Skipton. In June 1848 two members of the Baptist Village Mission, Samuel Jones and Robert Hogg, visited Skipton and began preaching in the Market Place, and in 1849 a room was obtained in Wesley Place for worship.
- St. Andrew's Methodist and United Reformed Church. The Skipton and Grassington Methodist Circuit office is based in the Church Hall.
- St Monica's Youth Centre (closed), Gargrave Road, a former convent and girls' boarding school, a grade II listed building.
- St Stephen's Catholic Church, Castle View Terrace, Skipton BD23 1NT.

== Sutton-in-Craven ==
- Sutton-in-Craven Baptist Church (or South Craven Baptist Church), serving the communities of Sutton, Glusburn, and Crosshills.
- The earliest Baptist Church in Sutton-in-Craven was established in 1711.

== Thornton-in-Craven ==
- St Mary the Virgin, part of the Parish of Broughton, Marton and Thornton.

== Threshfield ==
- St Margaret Clitherow Catholic Church, built in 1973, part of the parish of St Stephen, Skipton.
