= Broadband for the Rural North =

English internet service provider

Broadband for the Rural North Limited (B4RN)
- Trade name: B4RN - Broadband for the Rural North Ltd
- Industry: Telecommunications
- Founded: 2011
- Headquarters: Lancaster, England
- Area served: Lancashire, Cumbria, Yorkshire Dales, Northumberland, Norfolk, Cheshire
- Key people: Tom Rigg (CEO)
- Services: Internet connectivity
- Website: b4rn.org.uk

Broadband for the Rural North (or B4RN, read as "BARN") is a community-led project to bring high-speed broadband to homes and businesses in rural northern England as well as Cheshire and Norfolk. It functions as an Internet Service Provider.

All subscribers receive a FTTH gigabit (1,000 Mbps) symmetrical connection, with upload speeds matching downloads.

The company is headquartered in Melling, near Lancaster, and its Chief Executive Officer is Tom Rigg.

== Community Benefit Society ==
Founded by industry expert Barry Forde, management expert Monica Lee, and farmer Chris Conder (among others), Broadband for the Rural North Ltd was registered as a Community Benefit Society within the Industrial and Provident Societies Act on 15 August 2011. B4RN is regulated by the Financial Service Authority (Mutuals registration number 31352R).

It was formed to raise funds from the sale of shares. The Community Benefit Society can never be bought by a commercial operator and its surplus can only be distributed to the community.

== Volunteers ==
B4RN's model relies on volunteers, primarily drawn from the communities it provides broadband to. Early B4RN projects were dug by hand with volunteers earning shares through digging trenches, carrying equipment, and even supporting by making tea.

As the organisation has grown the approach has changed and more of the construction is now undertaken by staff and contractors, alongside volunteers.

Community groups and volunteers are still heavily involved, though. With the volunteers' help, B4RN has grown to an organisation with more than 11,000 customers.

== Funding ==
A B4RN project is mainly funded by three means.

1. Government Gigabit Vouchers - The UK Gigabit Voucher programme, run by DSIT (Department for Science, Innovation and Technology).

2. Investment - the shortfall in a project's build cost is raised through local community investment into Broadband for the Rural North Ltd.

3. Grants - Across the UK there are many charities and trusts that provide grants for the benefit of local residents and community groups. Many local groups apply for such funding towards their project costs.

== The B4RN Process ==
B4RN typically engages with community groups on the scale of a parish. B4RN’s model is to plan and build the network for the whole parish to ensure no one misses out, so long as they want the service and B4RN can get the relevant permissions.

Representatives of B4RN will meet locals and explain how the broadband service can be provided. If the community wants to bring B4RN to the village, then they will work together with B4RN to:

- Plan the network: Where will the cabinet go? Whose land does the network cross? How many roads, streams and hills are in the way?
- Promote B4RN to residents of the parish and encourage them to sign up for B4RN service.
- Arrange access rights across land. B4RN and the volunteers will work with landowners and farmers to enable B4RN access to dig a trench and install the cables.

Landowners provide free wayleaves for installing the network across their land while B4RN does not pay rent for the regional cabinet. This helps keeps the network overheads down. B4RN will estimate the cost of installing the network and the community group will then set about raising capital through community shares. Currently, government gigabit voucher funding is contributing significantly to the build cost, so the community only has to raise the shortfall.

Once there is sufficient demand, permissions in place, and funding secured, B4RN contractors supported by volunteers will start the installation.

The core network is connected to a cabinet, usually in the centre of a village. Larger ducts are laid from the cabinet to carry the fibre, which is sent down the duct via a process called blowing. The fibre is spliced inside an enclosure called a bullet, found inside chambers. Smaller ducts carry the fibre to each individual property. The fibre is fused at the property wall before going inside to the router.

== Geographical spread ==
As of January 2023, the B4RN network had spread to:

- Lune Valley (North Lancashire);
- North Yorkshire and the Yorkshire Dales;
- South Cumbria and the Lake District;
- Eden Valley (Cumbria)
- Allen Valleys (Northumberland)
- South Norfolk
- Cheshire

== B4RN Communities ==
The following places are either live on B4RN or planning or building the network:

Allen Valleys (Allendale Town, Catton, Spartylea, Whitfield); Arkholme; Abbeystead; Aughton; Barbon & Middleton; Bleasdale; Barrasford; Burton-in-Kendal; Burton-in-Lonsdale; Borwick & Priest Hutton; Burston & Shimpling; Capenhurst & Ledsham; Calder Vale; Cantsfield; Claughton; Chipping; Crook; Caton with Littledale; Cartmel Fell; Clapham; Capernwray; Crosthwaite; Casterton; Caton Village; Cautley; Cotterdale Dentdale; Dolphinholme; Dunsop Bridge; Firbank; Garsdale; Gressingham; Goosnargh; Grayrigg; Great Salkeld; Hornby-with-Farleton; High Bentham; Hincaster; Hutton Roof; Halton; Heversham; Ingleton; Kirkby Lonsdale; Keasden; Kirkoswald; Kirkwhelpington; Low Bentham; Lawkland, Eldroth, Wharf, Feizor & Austwick; Leck; Levens; Mallerstang; Melmerby & Gamblesby; Melling; Mungrisdale; Musgrave; Mansergh; New Hutton; Nether Kellet; Nether Wyresdale; Old Hutton; Over Kellet; Preton Patrick; Preston Richard; Quernmore; Roeburndale; Ravenstonedale; Rathmell & Wigglesworth; Sedbergh; Scole; Silverdale; Selside; Slaidburn; Stainmore; Stainton; Strickland Roger; Storth; Tatham; Tunstall; Tivetshall; Woodburn; Wennington; Whittington; Wray; Witherslack; Yealand Conyers; Yealand Redmayne.

== Recognition ==
B4RN and its volunteers have earned national recognition on several occasions.

In 2022, it was named 'Broadband Provider of the Year' and claimed the 'Community Improvement Award' at the Connected Britain Awards. B4RN were also named ‘Best Community Project’ and given the ‘Outstanding Contribution’ award by INCA.

In 2021, it was named 'Best Rural ISP' by ISPA whilst also being awarded the 'Best Community Project' by INCA.

B4RN volunteers and founders have also been individually recognised with Honours including MBEs and British Empire Medals.
