= Old Corn Mill =

Grade II listed building in Bradley, North Yorkshire, England

Coordinates: 53°56′04″N 1°59′42″W

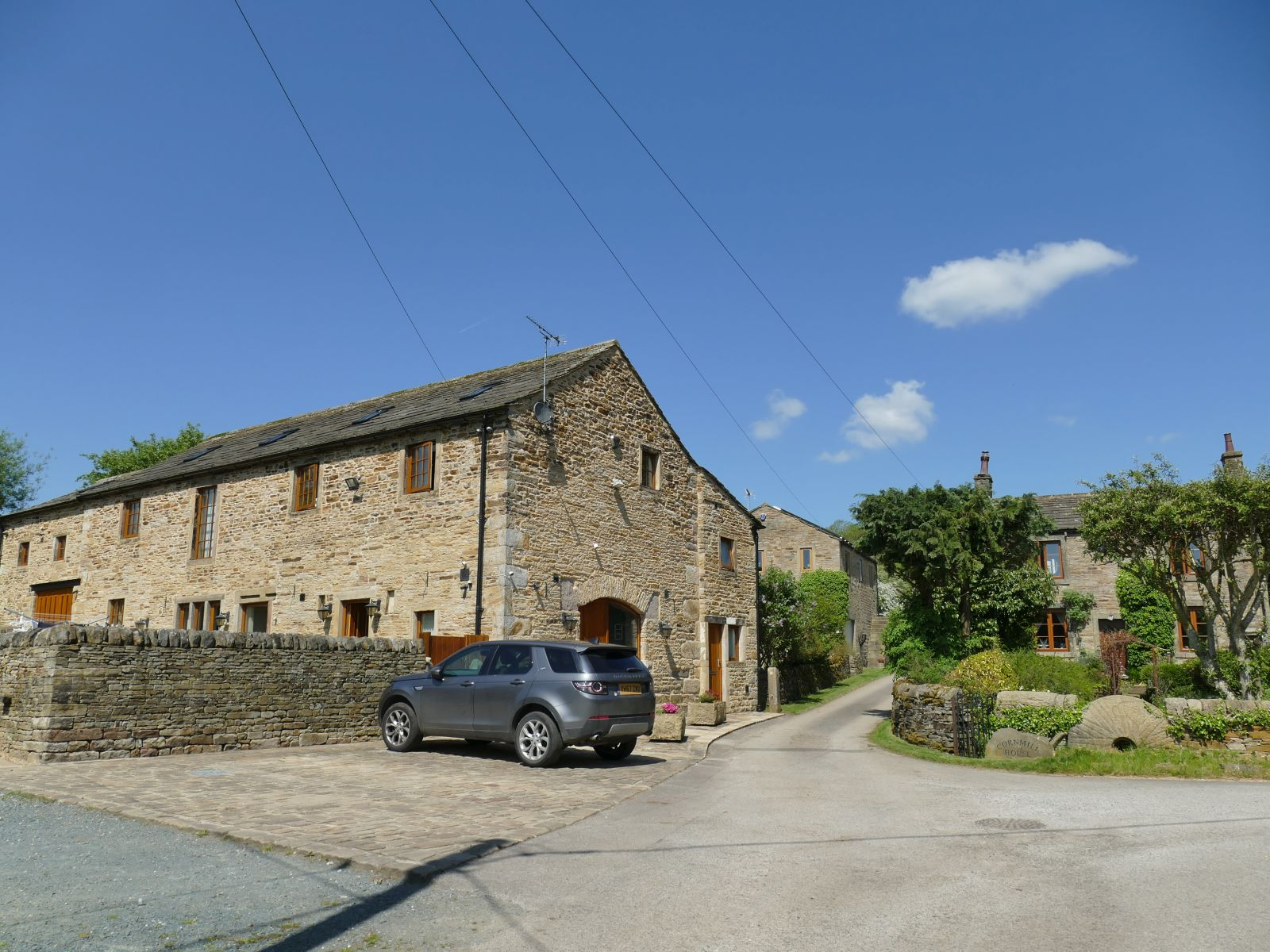
The mill in 2023

The Old Corn Mill is a historic building in Bradley, North Yorkshire, a village in England.

A watermill was first recorded in Bradley in 1314, although it is unknown whether this was on the site of the current mill. The current building is 18th century, and is depicted on a map of 1791. It was heightened, probably in the 19th century. The mill operated until about 1900, after which the ground floor was converted into a cattle shed. By the 1930s the mill's two ponds had been filled in. The building was Grade II listed in 1966, and in 2010, it was converted for residential use.

The two-storey building is constructed of millstone grit, with quoins, and roofs of stone slabs. The main block has five bays, with a two-bay extension to the northeast, an enclosed wheelhouse, and a later extension to the southeast. The openings include doorways, windows, one of which has three lights and mullions, cart entries and vents.

== See also ==
- Listed buildings in Bradley, North Yorkshire
