= Eldroth =

Village in North Yorkshire, England

Coordinates: 54.083°N 2.363°W

- Village
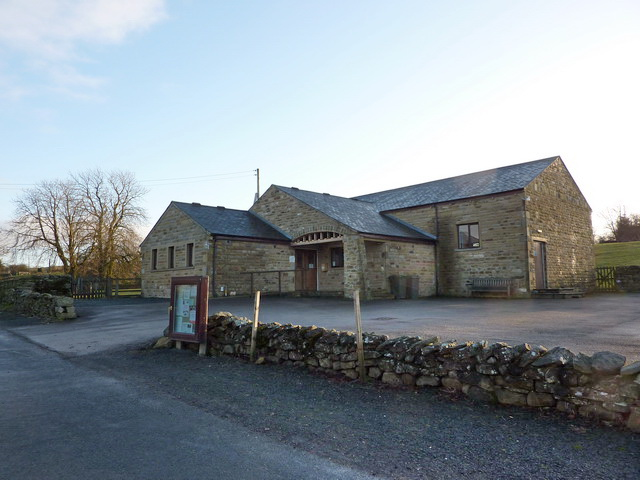
- Eldroth Village Hall

- Location within North Yorkshire
- OS grid reference: SD763652
- Civil parish: Lawkland
- Unitary authority: North Yorkshire
- Region: Yorkshire and the Humber
- Country: England
- Sovereign state: United Kingdom
- Post town: LANCASTER
- Postcode district: LA2
- Police: North Yorkshire
- Fire: North Yorkshire
- Ambulance: Yorkshire
- UK Parliament: Skipton and Ripon Constituency

Eldroth is a village in North Yorkshire, England. It is in the civil parish of Lawkland, some 3.25 miles (5.23 km) west of Settle, on a stream which is one of the tributaries of the River Wenning. The main part of Eldroth only consists of twelve buildings, but the presence of the church, marks the settlement out as a village, rather than a hamlet. Eldroth lies just within the Forest of Bowland Area of Outstanding Natural Beauty.

== History ==
Eldroth is listed as a hamlet in some sources, but the presence of a church, albeit outside and to the west of the settlement, defines it as a village. The main part of the village, which consists of twelve buildings, is some 3.25 miles (5.23 km) west of Settle, and 3.25 miles (5.23 km) south-east of Clapham. In another reference to its status as a village not a hamlet, Eldroth has a village hall. The first hall was installed just after the First World War, but it, and its 1967 replacement were huts or prefabricated buildings. A stone village hall was built and unveiled in the year 2000.

Whilst it is not mentioned specifically in the Domesday Book, some believed that the lost village of Heldetune was possibly Eldroth due to its listing among other places nearby, such as Clapham, Caton, Burton and Austwick. However, it also believed that Heldetune is Killington, west of Sedbergh. The name of the settlement is first recorded in 1338 as Ellerhowyth and means Alder hill [or] headland. It was recorded in 1580 as Elderothe, and during the 18th century was listed as Elderoth.

The village lies on a small stream known as Black Bank Syke which runs northwards to Fen Beck. This then flows westwards, being a tributary of the River Wenning, and then eventually the Lune. This places Eldroth just within the Lune catchment, whilst the land east of Eldroth, belongs to the Ribble catchment. Locally quarried stone was known as Eldroth Grit and was used in many buildings such as churches and manor houses in Eldroth, High and Low Bentham, and Newby. The stone is a Millstone Grit of the Hebden Formation.

Besides the village hall and three listed buildings (Bridge House, Park House Farmhouse, and Eldroth Hall and Eldroth Hall Cottage), the most notable structure in the village is the church. It was raised as a chapel-of-ease c. 1627, and consecrated in 1843. The main window is believed to date from the Reformation period. However, its status as a place of worship was not always respected; in 1668, one local was using it to store ale, despite objections from the vicar. At some point in the 19th century, the chapel was converted into a school, though this had ceased by the 1950s when the church was renovated. The church was again renovated in 1983, and is now part of the Benefice of Clapham with Keasden and Austwick.

Eldroth Hall has a Quaker burial ground, dedicated to the Society of Friends in 1662. George Fox himself visited Eldroth in 1669, and preached to a large gathering despite the threat of imprisonment from a nearby magistrate.

A railway was built through the village in 1850, and despite a signal box, a station was not provided. The nearest railway station is at Clapham 2.5 miles (4 km) to the north-west. The village lies just within the Forest of Bowland Area of Outstanding Natural Beauty.

== Governance ==
Historically in the wapentake of Ewcross and in the ceremonial county of the West Riding of Yorkshire, the village was moved into North Yorkshire in 1974. Prior to 1974, it was in the Settle Rural District council area as part of Lawkland civil parish. Between 1974 and 2023 it was in the Craven District, it is now administered by the unitary North Yorkshire Council.

The village is represented at Westminster as part of the Skipton and Ripon Constituency.

The census of 1841 recorded 36 people living in Eldroth. In 2011, the population of the village was listed as part of the Lawkland civil parish.
