= Airton =

Village and civil parish in North Yorkshire, England

Coordinates: 54°01′44″N 2°09′03″W

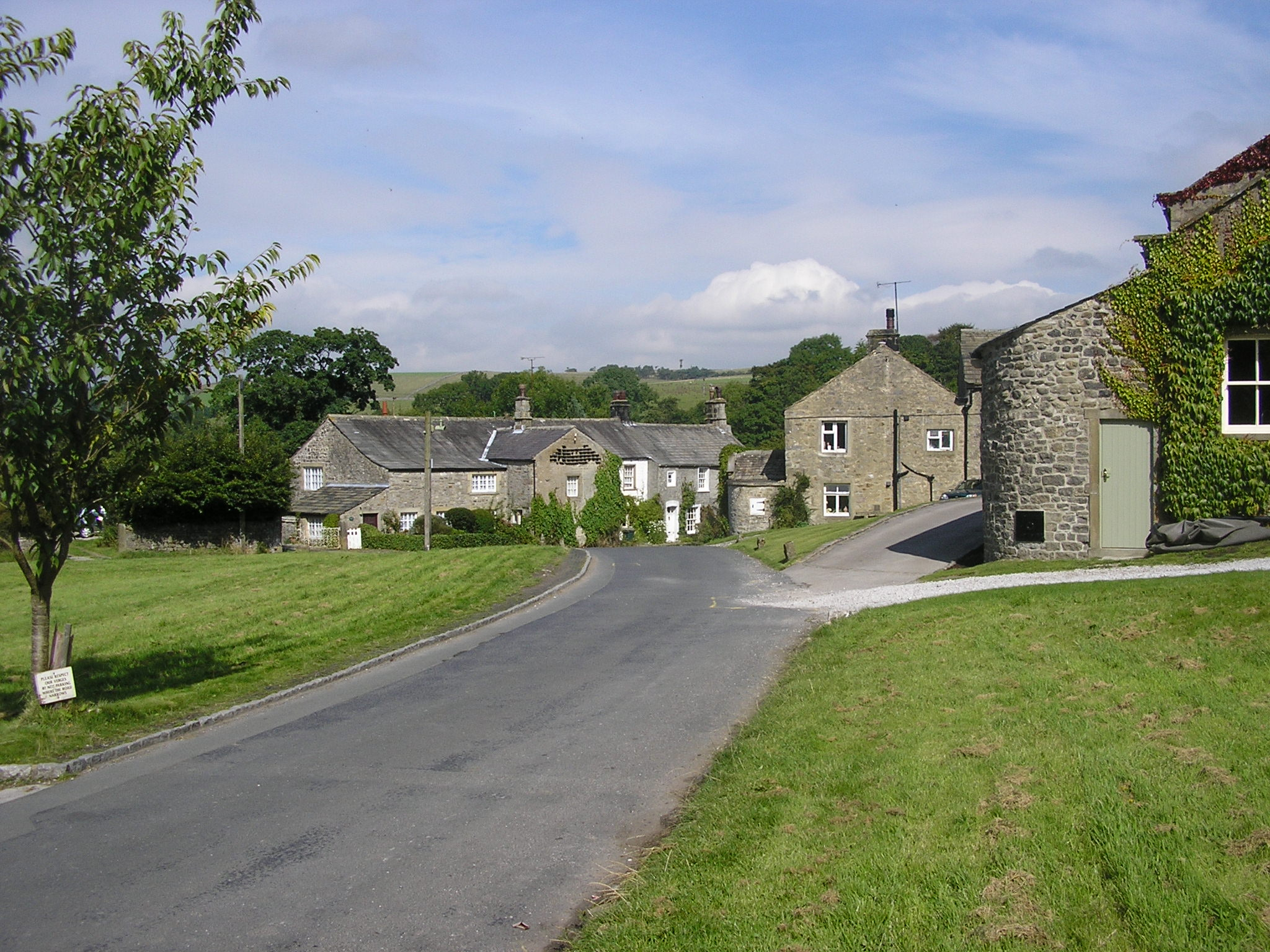
- Airton

- Location within North Yorkshire
- Population: 227 (Including Otterburn. 2021 census)
- OS grid reference: SD902592
  - London: 234 miles (377 km)
- Civil parish: Airton
- Unitary authority: North Yorkshire
- Ceremonial county: North Yorkshire
- Region: Yorkshire and the Humber
- Country: England
- Sovereign state: United Kingdom
- Post town: SKIPTON
- Postcode district: BD23
- Dialling code: 01729
- Police: North Yorkshire
- Fire: North Yorkshire
- Ambulance: Yorkshire
- UK Parliament: Skipton and Ripon

Airton (also known as Airton-in-Craven) is a small village and civil parish in North Yorkshire, England, situated 10 miles (16 km) north-west of Skipton. The village had a population of 175 according to the 2001 Census, 228 at the 2011 Census, decreasing to 227 at the 2021 Census.

Until 1974 it was part of the West Riding of Yorkshire. From 1974 to 2023 it was part of the Craven District, it is now administered by the unitary North Yorkshire Council.

== History ==
Listed as Airtone in the Domesday Book, the village takes its name from the River Aire which runs along its eastern edge. In the late 1600s a significant Quaker community developed in the village around Airton Quaker Meeting House. In use for the majority of its history, this building was restored between 2010 and 2012 and continues to host an active Quaker meeting.

Other significant buildings in Airton include a squatter's cottage on the village green, a former Methodist Chapel (now closed) and an old mill on the River Aire which is in use as a private residence. The old cotton mill was given listed status in 1989. There is no pub in the village; however there is a post office in the Farm Shop and Tea Room at Town End Farm on the road to Malham.

Airton lies in the Ecclesiastical Parish of St. Michael and All Angels, Kirkby Malham.

== Transport ==
There is a bus stop in the village with daily links to Malham and Skipton. Also, the local roads link the village to the A65.

== Tourism ==
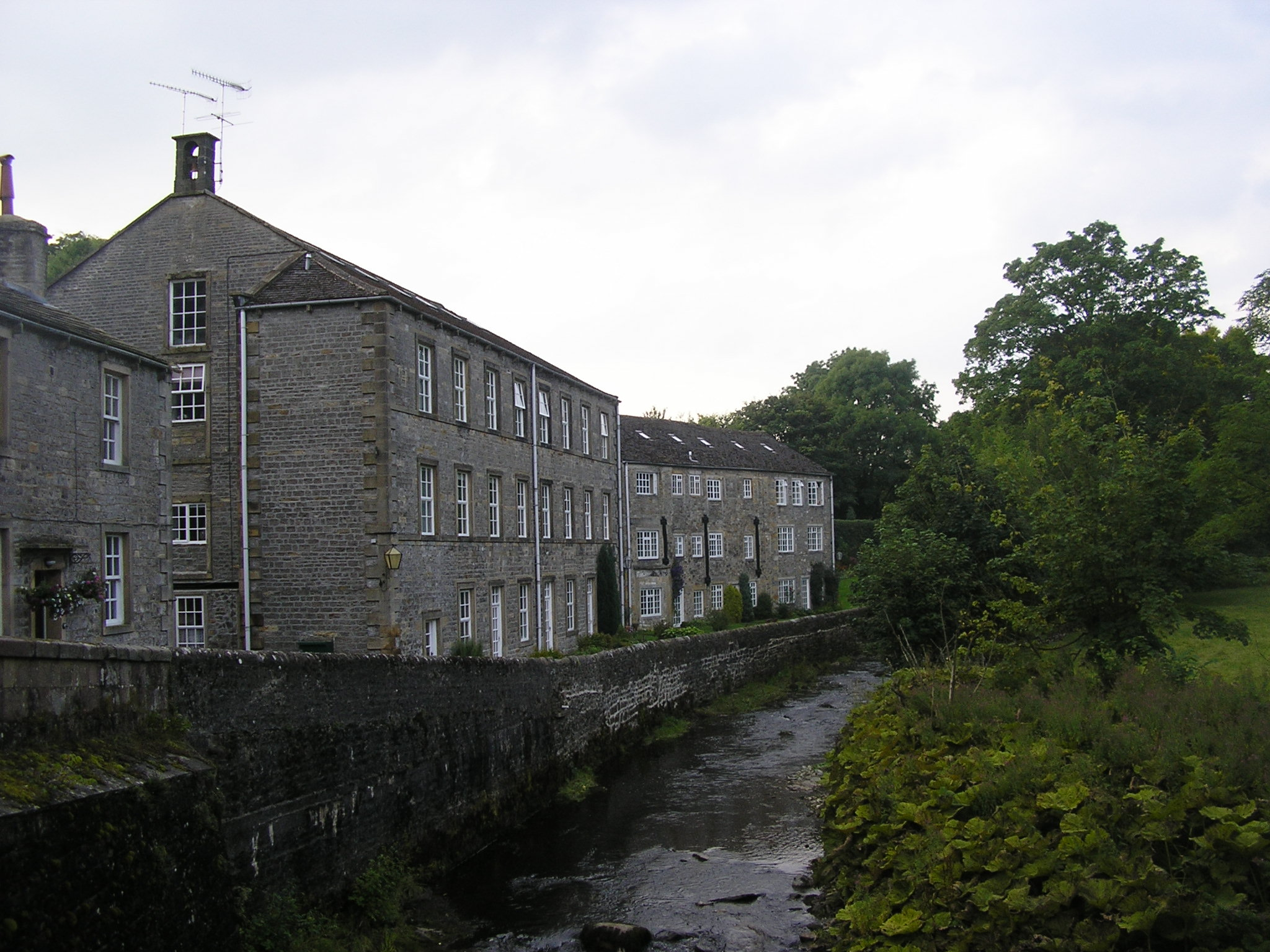
The old mill beside the River Aire

The village is in the Yorkshire Dales National Park and lies on the tourist route to Malham Cove and Malham Tarn. The Pennine Way passes around the edge of the village, alongside the river. The Way of the Roses cycle route passes through the village on the road between Settle and Grassington.

== See also ==
- Listed buildings in Airton
