= Listed buildings in Bradley, North Yorkshire =

Bradley is a civil parish in the county of North Yorkshire, England. It contains 14 listed buildings that are recorded in the National Heritage List for England. All the listed buildings are designated at Grade II, the lowest of the three grades, which is applied to "buildings of national importance and special interest". The parish contains the village of Low Bradley, the hamlet of High Bradley, and the surrounding countryside. Apart from a former watermill, the listed buildings consist of houses and cottages, farmhouses and farm buildings.

== Buildings ==
Name and location	Photograph	Date	Notes
Aisled Barn near Far Fold Farm; 53.94099°N 1.99333°W		c. 1500	The aisled barn and attached cowsheds and stable are in stone, with quoins, and roofs of sandstone slate and corrugated iron sheeting. There is a single storey and the openings include doorways, windows, and a cart entry.
College Farmhouse; 53.93206°N 1.99349°W		17th century	The farmhouse with a service building to the right is in stone with a stone slate roof. There are two storeys and three bays, and a later rear block. On the front are a doorway, and double-chamfered mullioned windows, those in the ground floor with hood moulds. The service building has an external staircase at the rear.
Moor Cottage; 53.94086°N 1.99663°W		17th century	The cottage, which was later extended to the right, is in stone with a stone slate roof, and two storeys. The doorway has a chamfered surround, and above it are scratched initials and a date. Some windows are double-chamfered and mullioned with hood moulds, and others have plain surrounds.
Aireview Farmhouse; 53.94083°N 1.99535°W		1672	The farmhouse is in stone, with quoins, and a stone slate roof with a stone ridge. There are two storeys and five bays, and a rear outshut. The doorway has altered jambs, and the windows are lattice casements with double-chamfered surrounds. Over the upper floor windows are carved initials and the date.
Cragg House; 53.94098°N 1.99737°W		1673	The house, which was extended in 1791, is in stone, with a string course forming a hood mould, and a stone slate roof. There are two storeys, a main block of two bays, and an extension to the right. On the front is a dated and initialled shield, and the windows are double-chamfered, one with a mullion remaining.
Hamblethorpe Farmhouse; 53.92608°N 1.99717°W	—	17th century	The house is in whitewashed stone with a deep M-shaped stone slate roof. There are two storeys, a continuous hood mould between the storeys, and two bays. The windows are double-chamfered and mullioned with some mullions missing.
White House and White Cottage; 53.94326°N 1.98563°W		17th century (probable)	A farmhouse to which a cottage was added in the 19th century, they are in stone and have a stone slate roof with a stone ridge. Near the centre is a two-storey porch with a triangular-headed doorway on the return, above which is a mullioned window. Most of the windows are chamfered and mullioned, and there are also modern casement windows.
Old Hall Farmhouse; 53.94083°N 1.99410°W		Late 17th century	The house is in stone with a stone slate roof, two storeys, and an L-shaped plan. On the south front is a doorway, a double-chamfered mullioned and transomed window, and sash windows. Elsewhere, there are chamfered mullioned windows with some mullions missing.
Old Hall; 53.93309°N 1.99304°W		1678	A large stone house with quoins and a stone slate roof. There are two storeys and attics, a double pile plan, and a symmetrical front with three gabled bays. The central doorway has a depressed ogee head with initials and the date. The windows are double-chamfered and mullioned with moulded hood moulds. The middle lights of the attic windows are taller and round-headed, and the hood mould is stepped over them. In the right gable end are two blocked chamfered openings, and in the left gable end are two round-headed openings with hood moulds.
Croft Farm Farmhouse and Croft Cottage; 53.93121°N 1.99418°W		17th or early 18th century	A farmhouse, and a barn converted into a cottage, in rendered brick with a stone slate roof. There are two storeys, each part has two bays, and at the rear is an outshut. In the centre of the house is a doorway with a triangular head, and the windows are double-chamfered and mullioned, those in the ground floor with hood moulds. On the outshut is an initialled and dated plaque.
Cottage attached to Ghyll Farmhouse; 53.93429°N 1.99261°W	—	17th or early 18th century	A farmhouse partly demolished and converted into a cottage, it is in stone with a stone slate roof. There are two storeys and a single bay. On each floor is a double-chamfered mullioned window with a hood mould, and the doorway has a plain surround.
Scarr House and barn 53.93262°N 1.99359°W		17th or early 18th century	The farmhouse and the barn to the left are in stone with stone slate roofs, and two storeys. The farmhouse has two bays and a central porch, over which is an arched panel with initials and a date. The windows on the front are sashes, and at the rear are double-chamfered mullioned windows with hood moulds. The barn has a cart entry with a fluted keystone and mullioned windows.
West Lane Farm; 53.93078°N 1.99528°W		17th or early 18th century	The house is in stone with quoins and a stone slate roof. There are two storeys and three bays. The doorway has monolithic jambs and an indented lintel. Most of the windows on the front are double-chamfered and mullioned, and at the rear is an iron casement window, a mullioned window and a sash window.
Old Corn Mill; 53.93456°N 1.99500°W		18th century	The corn watermill, which has been converted for other uses, is in millstone grit, with quoins, and roofs of stone slabs. There are two storeys, the main block has five bays, with a two-bay extension to the northeast, an enclosed wheelhouse, and a later extension to the southeast. The openings include doorways, windows, one of which has three lights and mullions, cart entries and vents,
