= 2010 Craven District Council election =

2010 UK local government election

Map of the results of the 2010 Craven District Council election. Conservatives in blue, independents in light grey and Liberal Democrats in yellow. Wards in dark grey were not contested in 2010.

The 2010 Craven District Council election took place on 6 May 2010 to elect members of Craven District Council in North Yorkshire, England. One third of the council was up for election and the Conservative Party gained overall control of the council from no overall control.

After the election, the composition of the council was:

- Conservative 18
- Independent 8
- Liberal Democrats 4

== Background ==
Before the election the Conservatives were one seat short of holding a majority on the council with 15 seats. 9 seats were contested in the election with the Conservatives standing in all 9, compared to 7 Liberal Democrats, 4 Labour, 3 independents and 1 from the Youth Party. 2 sitting councillors, Manuel Camcho and Stephen Butcher stood down from Bentham and Gargrave and Malhamdale wards respectively, while Carl Lis stood as a Conservative after having been a councillor before the election as an independent, and before 1998 as a Liberal Democrat.

== Election result ==
The results saw the Conservatives make 3 gains, including in Bentham and Settle and Ribblebanks wards. The third gain came in Ingleton and Clapham ward, where Carl Lis, who had held the seat as an independent before the election, was elected as a Conservative. The gains meant the Conservatives won 6 of the 9 seats contested, compared to 2 independents and 1 Liberal Democrats. Due to the general election being held at the same time overall turnout was over 75%, with the lowest being over 68% in Sutton-in-Craven.

Craven local election result 2010
Party	Seats	Gains	Losses	Net gain/loss	Seats %	Votes %	Votes	+/−
Conservative	6	3	0	+3	66.7	44.0	7,437	-11.0
Independent	2	0	2	-2	22.2	20.2	3,425	+10.0
Liberal Democrats	1	0	1	-1	11.1	28.2	4,763	+0.8
Labour	0	0	0	0	0.0	5.3	900	-2.1
The Youth Party	0	0	0	0	0.0	2.3	395	+2.3

== Ward results ==
Aire Valley with Lothersdale
Party	Candidate	Votes	%	±%
Liberal Democrats	Mark Wheeler	1,024	47.3	+23.8
Conservative	Gemma Harling	917	42.3	−20.7
Labour	Duncan Hall	226	10.4	−3.1
Majority		107	5.0	
Turnout		2,167	74.5	+28.8
Liberal Democrats hold		Swing		

Bentham
Party	Candidate	Votes	%	±%
Conservative	Linda Brockbank	893	42.3	−7.5
Liberal Democrats	Barry Hymer	619	29.3	+29.3
Independent	Victoria Hindle	598	28.3	−21.9
Majority		274	13.0	
Turnout		2,110	70.4	+23.9
Conservative gain from Independent		Swing		

Gargrave and Malhamdale
Party	Candidate	Votes	%	±%
Conservative	Alan Sutcliffe	1,169	62.2	−8.2
Liberal Democrats	Stephen Walpole	709	37.8	+8.2
Majority		460	24.5	−16.3
Turnout		1,878	75.7	+28.6
Conservative hold		Swing		

Glusburn
Party	Candidate	Votes	%	±%
Independent	Philip Barrett	1,499	67.7	+8.8
Conservative	Wendy Clark	481	21.7	−19.4
Labour	Vincent Keirle	233	10.5	+10.5
Majority		1,018	46.0	+28.2
Turnout		2,213	70.3	+27.5
Independent hold		Swing		

Hellfield and Long Preston
Party	Candidate	Votes	%	±%
Conservative	Helen Firth	743	59.2	−2.0
Liberal Democrats	Judith Mason	513	40.8	+40.8
Majority		230	18.3	−4.1
Turnout		1,256	70.9	+26.5
Conservative hold		Swing		

Ingleton and Clapham
Party	Candidate	Votes	%	±%
Conservative	Carl Lis	1,342	58.6	+37.2
Liberal Democrats	Mark Christie	749	32.7	+32.7
Labour	Christine Rose	198	8.7	+8.7
Majority		593	25.9	
Turnout		2,289	72.3	+25.6
Conservative gain from Independent		Swing		

Penyghent
Party	Candidate	Votes	%	±%
Conservative	Richard Welch	680	61.3	+1.8
Liberal Democrats	Gwendalyn Jessop	430	38.7	−1.8
Majority		250	22.5	+3.4
Turnout		1,110	75.4	+25.6
Conservative hold		Swing		

Settle and Ribblesbanks
Party	Candidate	Votes	%	±%
Conservative	David Staveley	810	42.1	−22.2
Liberal Democrats	David Heather	719	37.4	+15.0
The Youth Party	Simon Lord	395	20.5	+20.5
Majority		91	4.7	−37.2
Turnout		1,924	71.7	+26.4
Conservative gain from Liberal Democrats		Swing		

Sutton-in-Craven
Party	Candidate	Votes	%	±%
Independent	Stephen Place	1,328	67.3	+2.4
Conservative	Gillian Quinn	402	20.4	−14.7
Labour	James Black	243	12.3	+12.3
Majority		926	46.9	+17.2
Turnout		1,973	68.1	+29.5
Independent hold		Swing		
