= Listed buildings in Airton =

Airton is a civil parish in the county of North Yorkshire, England. It contains 16 listed buildings that are recorded in the National Heritage List for England. Of these, one is listed at Grade II*, the middle of the three grades, and the others are at Grade II, the lowest grade. The parish contains the village of Airton and the surrounding countryside. Most of the listed buildings are houses, cottages, farmhouses and farm buildings, and the others include a Friends' meeting house and associated structures, a former mill and manager's house, a limekiln and a telephone kiosk.

== Key ==
Grade	Criteria
II*	Particularly important buildings of more than special interest
II	Buildings of national importance and special interest

== Buildings ==
Name and location	Photograph	Date	Notes	Grade
Garris Croft and Tatham Cottage; 54.02786°N 2.15180°W	—	17th century	Two houses in stone with a stone slate roof and two storeys. Tatham Cottage on the right has a doorway with a chamfered surround, and windows with chamfered surrounds, two with mullions, and at the rear are two three-light mullioned and transomed windows. Garris Croft has a doorway with a plain surround, and contains sash windows.	II
Vipoint House and Airton Cottage; 54.02797°N 2.15029°W		1666	The house, which was later extended, is in stone with a stone slate roof. It has two storeys and an irregular plan. The doorway has an elliptical head, a chamfered surround, a lintel carved with initials and the date, and a hood mould. Above it is a two-light window with a chamfered surround and a moulded hood mould, and tiers of pigeon holes. The windows are of various types; some have chamfered surrounds, some have mullions and some have hood moulds.	II
Ellis Cottage and Ellis House; 54.02908°N 2.14950°W		1696	A house later divided into two houses, it is in stone with a stone slate roof. There are two storeys, a range of four bays, and a projecting gabled cross-wing on the left. The cross-wing contains two small windows with chamfered surrounds, a fixed light above, and over that is a dovecote. The right two bays of the main range project, and each part contains a doorway with a chamfered surround, the right doorway with a slightly pointed lintel with initials and the date. The windows are either sashes, or have fixed lights. On the right return is a massive external chimney stack.	II
Airton Quaker Meeting House, archway and bench 54.02884°N 2.14947°W		1700	The meeting house is in limestone and sandstone on a plinth of boulders, with quoins and stone slate roofs. It has a rectangular plan, and consists of a large meeting room, a smaller meeting room and a gallery. The doorway has chamfered jambs, and a basket-arched lintel with a dated and initialled panel, above which is a flat stone canopy on shaped brackets. The windows are mullioned with two lights. Adjoining the meeting house is a stone archway with chamfered jambs and lintel. Facing the front is a long stone bench, and at the northeast end is an opening into the burial ground flanked by square stone piers with chamfered tops.	II*
The Nook, The Barn, and burial ground walls, Airton Quaker Meeting House; 54.02874°N 2.14942°W	—	Early 18th century	The warden's cottage for the meeting house and an attached stable and hayloft, later converted into a cottage and a hostel. They are in limestone and sandstone with stone slate roofs. They have two storeys, and are set at right angles. The cottage has a porch, quoins and an ogee-moulded cornice, and a moulded coped gable with ogee-moulded kneelers. The burial ground is enclosed by mainly drystone walls, coped with flat stones or boulders.	II
Eastern Barn, Town End; 54.02773°N 2.15259°W		18th century (probable)	The barn, which has been converted for residential use, is in stone with a stone slate roof and two storeys. On the front is a segmental-arched cart entry, into which a modern doorway has been inserted, and there are two outshuts with slate roofs.	II
Western Barn, Town End; 54.02763°N 2.15309°W		18th century (probable)	The barn is in limestone with a stone slate roof. On the south front are two segmental-arched cart entries, one with an illegible plaque above it, and two outshuts, one with rounded corners, and the other taller, under a catslide roof.	II
Rose Mount; 54.02819°N 2.15195°W		Late 18th century	A house in stone with a stone slate roof and two storeys. There are two doorways, the right one with a chamfered surround and the traces of a date, and the windows are a mix of casements and sashes.	II
Kirk Syke Farmhouse and barn 54.02042°N 2.15560°W	—	c. 1800	The farmhouse and attached barn are rendered and have a slate roof. The farmhouse has two storeys and three bays. It contains a doorway with a plain surround, and most of the windows are recessed with three lights and mullions. The barn has quoins, and a catslide roof over a porch and an outshut. There is a small opening with a carved lintel.	II
Riverside Cottage; 54.02899°N 2.14859°W		Early 19th century	A mill manager's house, later a private house, it is in stone with a stone slate roof. There are two storeys and three bays. The doorway has a plain surround and a flat hood, and the windows are sashes with plain surrounds.	II
The Green; 54.02869°N 2.15035°W		Early 19th century	A small house in stone with a stone slate roof. There are two storeys and two bays. The doorway and the windows, which are sashes, have plain surrounds.	II
The Manor House; 54.02840°N 2.15062°W		Early 19th century	The house is in stone with a stone slate roof. There are two storeys and four bays. The openings have plain surrounds, the windows are sashes, and the doorway has a flat hood on cut consoles.	II
Ormsgill Green; 54.03476°N 2.19972°W		Early to mid 19th century	The house is in stone with a stone slate roof. There are two storeys and an L-shaped plan, with ranges of three and four bays. The doorways have plain surrounds, and in the west range is an arched cart entry.	II
River Walk; 54.02922°N 2.14882°W		1836	A corn mill, later a cotton spinning mill, subsequently converted into flats, it is in stone, with rusticated quoins, and a stone slate roof with coped gables and kneelers. There are three storeys, eight bays on the front facing the stream, and seven on the front at the rear. In the south gable end are loading doorways converted into windows, and on the gable apex is a bellcote. On the upper floor of the rear is a loggia of round-headed arches using the jambs of former windows.	II
Limekiln, Ormsgill Green; 54.03490°N 2.20037°W		19th century (probable)	The visible part of the limekiln consists of a stone arch in a relieving wall, coped with larger stones, and a curved upper wall also in stone.	II
Telephone kiosk 54.02816°N 2.15035°W		1935	The K6 type telephone kiosk was designed by Giles Gilbert Scott. Constructed in cast iron with a square plan and a dome, it has three unperforated crowns in the top panels.	II
