= Listed buildings in Lawkland =

Lawkland is a civil parish in the county of North Yorkshire, England. It contains 18 listed buildings that are recorded in the National Heritage List for England. Of these, one is listed at Grade I, the highest of the three grades, and the others are at Grade II, the lowest grade. The parish is rural and does not contain any settlement of significant size. The most important building in the parish is Lawkland Hall, which is listed at Grade I, and the others include farmhouses, farm buildings, a bridge, and five parish boundary stones.

== Key ==
Grade	Criteria
I	Buildings of exceptional interest, sometimes considered to be internationally important
II	Buildings of national importance and special interest

== Buildings ==
Name and location	Photograph	Date	Notes	Grade
Lawkland Hall and walls 54.08875°N 2.34320°W		Late 16th century	A large house that has been extended through the centuries, in stone with a stone slate roof. It consists of a hall range with two storeys and three bays, a projecting gabled wing on the left with two storeys and one bay, a projecting right gabled wing with three storeys and one bay, and a two-storey service wing to the right. The central doorway has a moulded surround and a decorated lintel, and above it is a coat of arms. The windows are mullioned and transomed, some with hood moulds, and to the right on both floors is a small circular window. In the centre of the roof is a dormer with a coped gable, kneelers and ball finials. The left wing has ball finials to the kneelers, and the right wing has crocketed finials to the kneelers and a cross finial on the apex. Running from the east and west of the hall are garden walls about 2.5 metres (8 ft 2 in) high.	I
Middle Birks Farmhouse; 54.08094°N 2.40397°W	—	1633	The farmhouse is in stone with eaves modillions and a roof of stone slate and slate. There are two storeys and four bays. The right-hand bay contains a wagon entrance. On the front is a gabled porch, its entrance with a chamfered and moulded surround, and a decorated lintel. Above this is a decorated and initialled datestone, and a hood mould which continues over the flanking single-light windows. Most of the other windows are mullioned, with some mullions missing, and some with hood moulds.	II
Butterfield Gap Farmhouse; 54.06769°N 2.36438°W	—	17th century	The farmhouse, which was refronted in the 18th century, is in stone with a stone slate roof. There are two storeys and two bays. In the centre is a porch with a slate gable, and a doorway with a limewashed moulded surround, and a decorated lintel. The windows are mullioned, and some mullions are missing.	II
Eldroth Hall and Cottage; 54.08272°N 2.36221°W		Mid 17th century	The farmhouse and cottage are in stone with a stone slate roof. There are two storeys, the house has an L-shaped plan and three bays, and recessed on the left is a lower two-bay wing. The doorway has a moulded surround, and the windows are mullioned, some with hood moulds.	II
Israel Farmhouse; 54.06531°N 2.38670°W		17th century	The farmhouse is in stone with eaves modillions and a stone slate roof. There are two storeys and three bays. On the front is a doorway with a plain surround and sash windows. At the rear is a doorway with a chamfered surround, mullioned windows, sash windows and a central round-headed stair window.	II
Bank End Farmhouse; 54.09322°N 2.34559°W	—	1673	The farmhouse is in limewashed stone with painted stone dressings, shaped eaves modillions, and a stone slate roof with gable coping and a shaped kneeler on the right. There are two storeys and three bays. The doorway has a plain surround and a basket-arched lintel, and the windows are mullioned. At the rear is a porch, and a doorway with a moulded surround, and a decorated lintel with the date and initials, and a round-headed stair window with moulded imposts and an imitation keystone.	II
Bank Barn; 54.09042°N 2.34342°W	—	Late 17th century	The barn is in stone on a partial plinth, with a stone slate roof, and six bays. The wagon entrance has a chamfered surround and a basket-arched lintel. On the side are three massive stone corbels carved with a 'V'. Elsewhere, there are casement windows, vents, and slate string courses. In the right return are mullioned windows.	II
Park House Farmhouse; 54.08228°N 2.36149°W	—	Late 17th century	The farmhouse is in limewashed stone on a partial plinth, with a stone slate roof. There are two storeys, three bays, and a rear wing. The central doorway has a plain surround and a gabled slate hood. The ground floor windows are mullioned, with some mullions missing, and in the upper floor are sash windows.	II
Ravenshaw Farmhouse; 54.06803°N 2.37069°W	—	Late 17th to early 18th century	The farmhouse is in limewashed stone with painted stone dressings and a stone slate roof. There are two storeys and two bays. The central doorway has a plain surround, the windows are mullioned, and they contain casements.	II
Low Lanshaw Farmhouse; 54.09153°N 2.37870°W	—	1726	The farmhouse is in stone with shaped eaves modillions and a stone slate roof. There are two storeys, three bays, and a rear wing. In the centre is a gabled porch, its opening with a moulded surround, a lintel with a dated and initialled imitation keystone, moulded gable coping, and a ball finial with a moulded base. The windows are casements with plain surrounds. On the wing is an inscribed tablet.	II
Bridge House; 54.08209°N 2.35710°W	—	Mid 18th century	The farmhouse, which incorporates earlier features, is in stone with a stone slate roof. There are two storeys and two bays, with the gable end facing the road. The central doorway has a plain surround, and the windows are mullioned, those at the rear dating from the 17th century.	II
Harden Bridge; 54.10577°N 2.36506°W		Mid 18th century (probable)	The bridge, which was widened in about 1840, carries a road over Austwick Beck. It is in stone, and consists of two segmental arches. The bridge has a raked plinth, recessed voussoirs, triangular cutwaters, pilasters and coped parapets.	II
Crow Nest; 54.09691°N 2.33725°W	—	Late 18th century	The farmhouse is in stone with eaves modillions, two storeys and four bays. The doorway has a moulded surround, a rectangular fanlight and a hood on console brackets, and the windows are sashes. At the rear is a doorway with a chamfered surround and a segmental-arched lintel.	II
Boundary stone at SD 74768 66110; 54.09032°N 2.38730°W		Early 19th century (probable)	The parish boundary stone is a slab about 1 metre (3 ft 3 in) high and 1 metre (3 ft 3 in) wide. It has a pointed top and chamfered arrises. The stone is inscribed with the names of the parishes, which are separated by a V-shaped groove.	II
Boundary stone at SD 77931 67472; 54.10266°N 2.33899°W		Early 19th century (probable)	The parish boundary stone is a slab about 1 metre (3 ft 3 in) high and 1 metre (3 ft 3 in) wide. It has a pointed top and chamfered arrises. The stone is inscribed with the names of the parishes, which are separated by a V-shaped groove.	II
Boundary stone south of Field House; 54.10089°N 2.34636°W		Early 19th century	The parish boundary stone is a slab about 1 metre (3 ft 3 in) high and 1 metre (3 ft 3 in) wide. It has a pointed top and chamfered arrises. The stone is inscribed with the names of the parishes, which are separated by a V-shaped groove.	II
Boundary stone southeast of Lane End House; 54.08196°N 2.32581°W	—	Early 19th century	The parish boundary stone is a slab about 1 metre (3 ft 3 in) high and 1 metre (3 ft 3 in) wide. It has a pointed top and chamfered arrises. The stone is inscribed with the names of the parishes, which are separated by a V-shaped groove.	II
Boundary stone southeast of Blaithwaite Farmhouse; 54.07759°N 2.33491°W		Early 19th century	The parish boundary stone is a slate slab about 60 centimetres (24 in) high. The upper surface is angled, and the stone is inscribed with the name of the parish.	II
