= Lawkland =

Civil parish in North Yorkshire, England

Coordinates: 54°05′35″N 2°20′43″W

- Location within North Yorkshire
- Population: 231 (2011 census)
- OS grid reference: SD775662
- Civil parish: Lawkland
- Unitary authority: North Yorkshire
- Ceremonial county: North Yorkshire
- Region: Yorkshire and the Humber
- Country: England
- Sovereign state: United Kingdom
- Post town: LANCASTER
- Postcode district: LA2
- Police: North Yorkshire
- Fire: North Yorkshire
- Ambulance: Yorkshire

Lawkland is a civil parish in North Yorkshire, England, near the A65 and 4 miles (6.4 km) west of Settle. It lies within the Forest of Bowland Area of Outstanding Natural Beauty but was not part of the ancient Forest or the Lordship of Bowland. There is no Lawkland village as such although there are clusters of farms and dwellings around Lawkland Green and Eldroth.

In 2014 those parts of Lawkland parish north of the A65 (including the hamlet of Feizor) were transferred to Austwick parish. Lawkland parish gained those parts of Austwick parish south of the A65. Lawkland does not have a parish council but does have an annual parish meeting.

The grade I-listed Lawkland Hall lies in the parish, at the centre of a 545 acres (221 ha) estate.

Until 1974 it was part of the West Riding of Yorkshire. From 1974 to 2023 it was part of the Craven District, it is now administered by the unitary North Yorkshire Council.

== See also ==
- Listed buildings in Lawkland
