= Lawkland Hall =

Building in Lawkland, North Yorkshire, England

Coordinates: 54°05′19″N 2°20′36″W

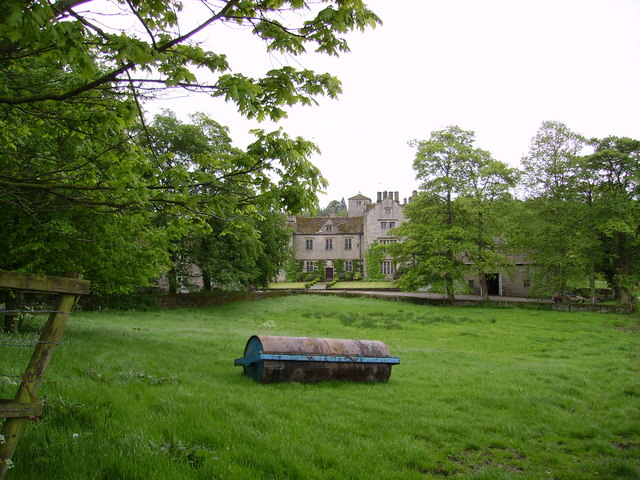
The building, in 2006

Lawkland Hall is a historic building in Lawkland, a village in North Yorkshire, in England.

The oldest section of the building is the west wing, built in the late 16th century for the Yorke family. In 1572, it was bought by the Ingleby family, who in the late 17th century added the hall, east wing and service wing. The house was altered in the mid 18th century, and modernised by J. N. Ambler in the 1920s. The house and 545 acres (221 ha) estate were put up for sale in 2023 for £5.6 million. At the time, the house had nine bedrooms and four reception rooms, while the grounds contained two three-bedroom cottages, Lawkland Hall Farm, woodland, shooting grounds and a pond. The building, along with its garden walls, has been grade I listed since 1958.

The hall is built of stone with a stone slate roof. It consists of a hall range with two storeys and three bays, a projecting gabled wing on the left with two storeys and one bay, a projecting right gabled wing with three storeys and one bay, and a two-storey service wing to the right. The central doorway has a moulded surround and a decorated lintel, and above it is a coat of arms. The windows are mullioned and transomed, some with hood moulds, and to the right on both floors is a small circular window. In the centre of the roof is a dormer with a coped gable, kneelers and ball finials. The left wing has ball finials to the kneelers, and the right wing has crocketed finials to the kneelers and a cross finial on the apex. Running from the east and west of the hall are garden walls about 2.5 metres (8 ft 2 in) high.

Inside the house, there is panelling from the late 1600s and early 1700s, which has been rearranged. There is a late 17th century staircase in the hall, moved from elsewhere, an early-20th century bathroom including a sunken bath, a late 16th century spiral stone staircase in the tower, and a former chapel on the second floor, with a chimney flue rearranged to resemble a priest hole.

== See also ==
- Grade I listed buildings in North Yorkshire (district)
- Listed buildings in Lawkland
