= Airton Quaker Meeting House =

Building in Airton, North Yorkshire, England

Coordinates: 54°01′44″N 2°08′58″W

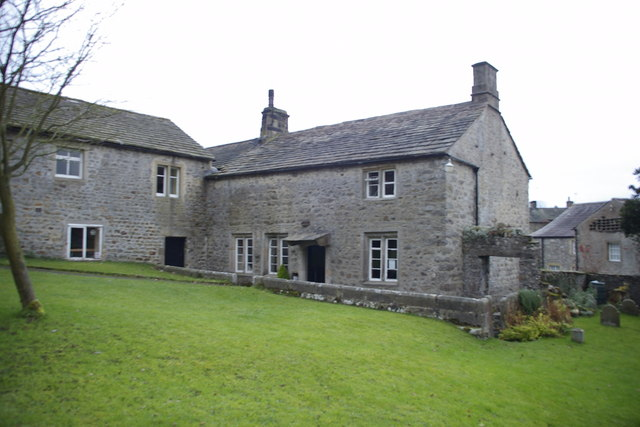
The building, in 2007

The Airton Quaker Meeting House is a historic religious building in Airton, a village in North Yorkshire, in England.

As a vernacular building, the origin of the meeting house is uncertain. The National Churches Trust argues that it was purpose-built in the early 1600s as a meeting house for the Seekers, an early group of religious dissenters. By the time of the English Civil War, the land on which the building stands was owned by John Lambert, a military commander who was sympathetic to the new Quaker movement. George Fox may have preached in Airton in 1652, while another Quaker leader, Gervase Benson, definitely preached in the village by 1658, in what he described as a "barn-like building". A Quaker community became established in the village, with the first recorded burial in 1663, and regular meetings by the end of the decade.

The building appears to have originally been a cruck barn In about 1694, the building was reconstructed, the work being funded by William Ellis, a local linen manufacturer. The building thereafter served as a Quaker meeting house; it is unclear whether it was the barn mentioned by Benson, but if its history is as given by the National Churches Trust, it is the oldest surviving Quaker meeting house.

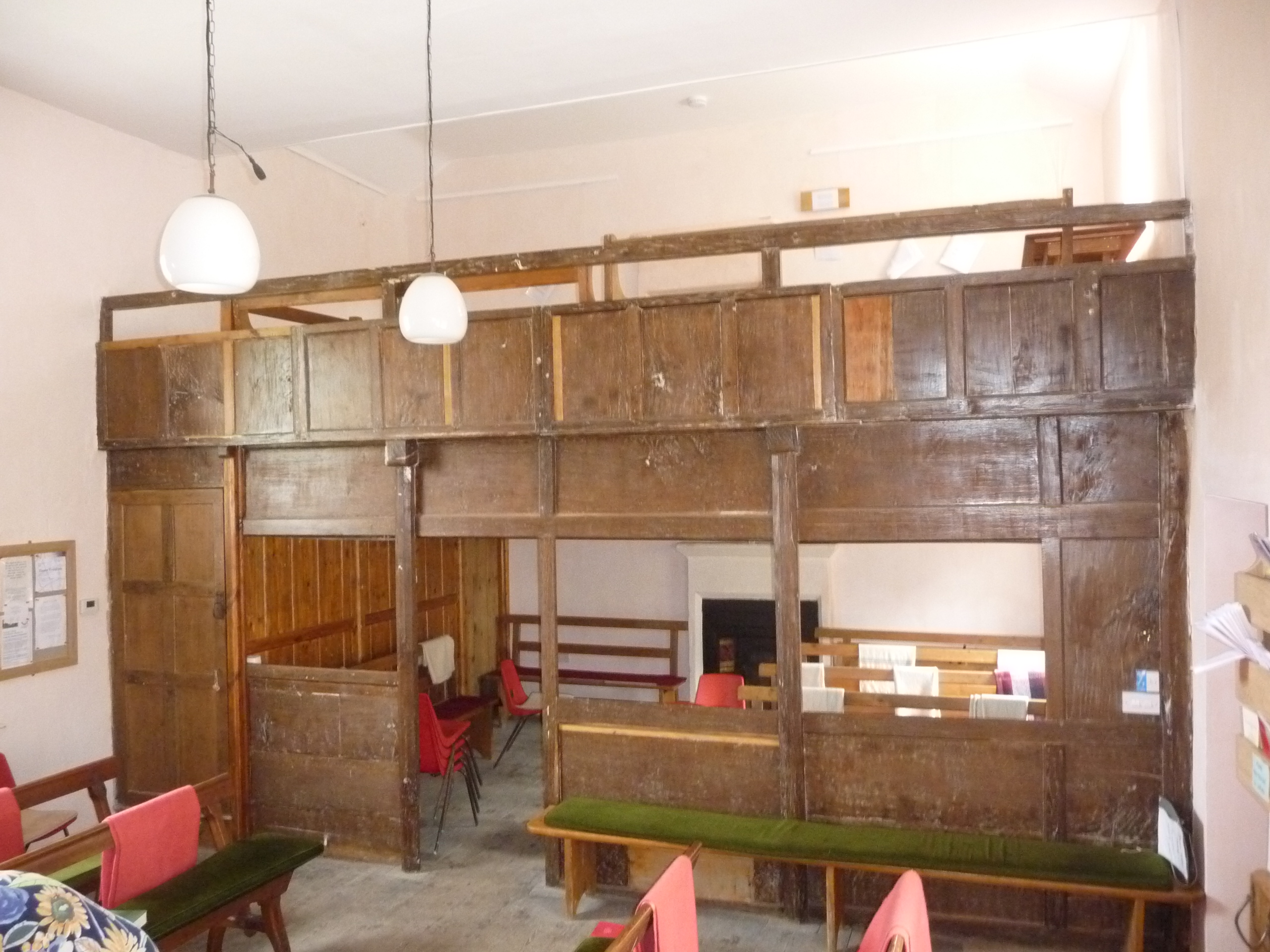
Gallery of the meeting house

In 1700, William Ellis and his wife Alice bought the building from Lambert for £31, and the door lintel was inscribed with the date to commemorate the transaction. The building was repeatedly altered over the following centuries, but retained its basic form. Regular worship continued until World War II, when two evacuee families were housed in the building. After the war, meetings were held only twice or three times a year, and the building fell into disrepair. By 2000, part of the roof had collapsed, and the walls were cracked, allowing damp in. Local Quakers decided to reinstate regular meetings, and gradually restored the building.

The building was Grade II listed in 1958, and was upgraded to Grade II* in 2020.

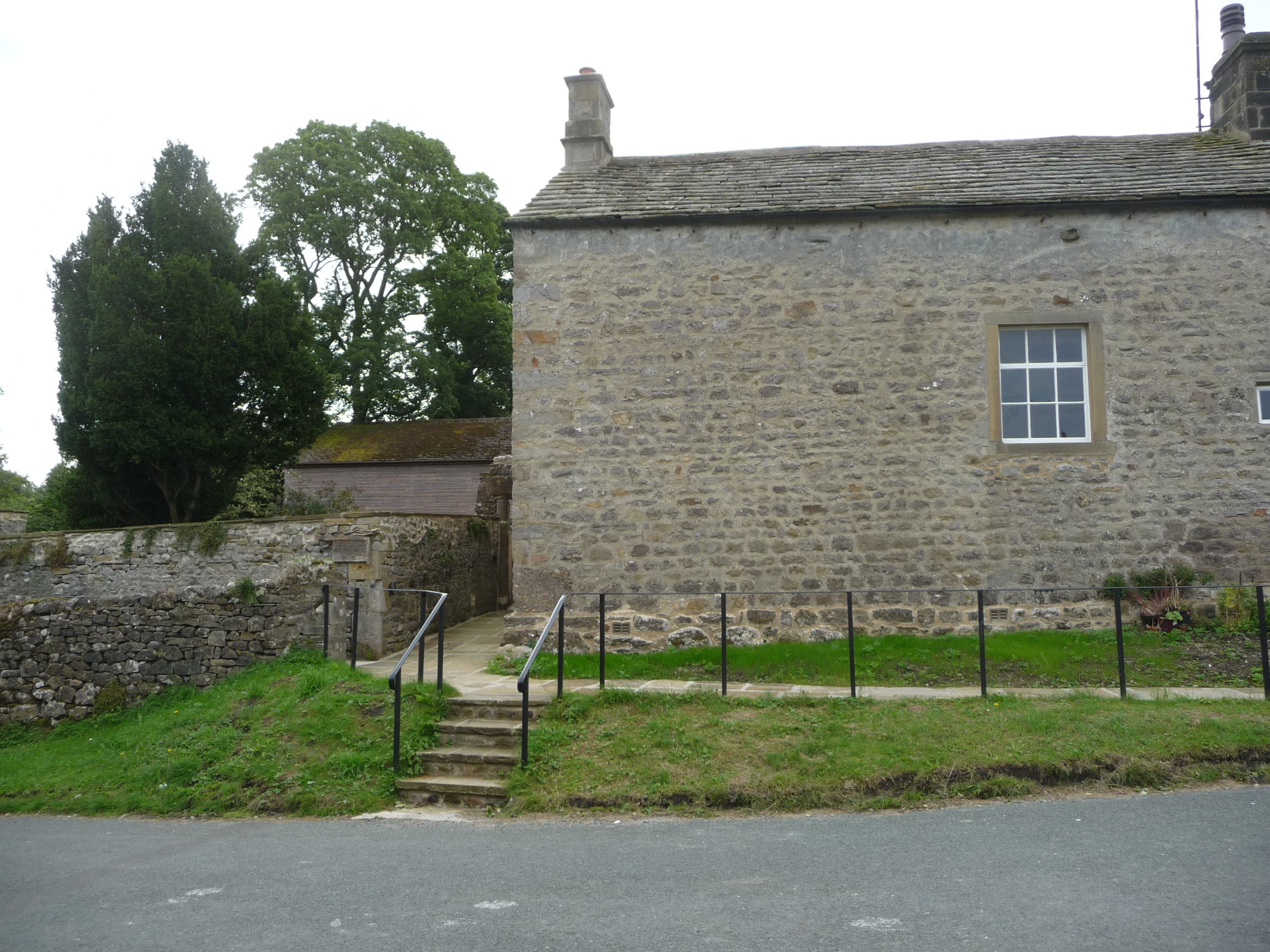
North-west view of the building

The building is constructed of limestone and sandstone rubble, on a plinth of boulders, and has a slate roof. It is rectangular in plan, and is divided into a main meeting room and a smaller room, originally the women's meeting room. The two are separated by a timber partition, with a gallery above, reached by steps, the structure appearing to date from around 1700. There is a cottage attached. The south-east windows appear to date from the early 18th century, and a large one on the north-west side is 19th-century. On the north-east side is a chimney stack, with two early 18th century fireplaces. Inside, there is a long stone elders' bench, which is likely to date from the 1690s.

There is a rubblestone archway attached to the north-east wall, which is included in the meeting house's listing. Also attached is the early 18th century warden's house, now named The Nook. Beyond the house is a former barn and hayloft, and there is also a burial ground, with rubblestone walls. These are listed at grade II, with the house and barn.

== See also ==
- Listed buildings in Airton
