= Bradley, North Yorkshire =

Village in North Yorkshire, England

Coordinates: 53°55′57″N 1°59′52″W

Bradley
- Location within North Yorkshire
- Population: 1,244 (2011)
- OS grid reference: SE002485
  - London: 185 mi (298 km) SSE
- Civil parish: Bradleys Both
- Unitary authority: North Yorkshire
- Ceremonial county: North Yorkshire
- Region: Yorkshire and the Humber
- Country: England
- Sovereign state: United Kingdom
- Post town: KEIGHLEY
- Postcode district: BD20
- Dialling code: 01535
- Police: North Yorkshire
- Fire: North Yorkshire
- Ambulance: Yorkshire
- UK Parliament: Skipton and Ripon

Bradley is a village in North Yorkshire, England. It is situated between Skipton and Keighley, approximately 1/2 mile (800 m) from the A629 and 2 miles (3 km) from the nearby town of Skipton. Bradley is divided into two parts, the hamlet of High Bradley and the village of Low Bradley, known collectively as Bradleys Both although traditionally the village used to be named Bradley Ambo.

Until 1974 it was part of the West Riding of Yorkshire. From 1974 to 2023 it was part of the Craven District, it is now administered by the unitary North Yorkshire Council.

== History ==
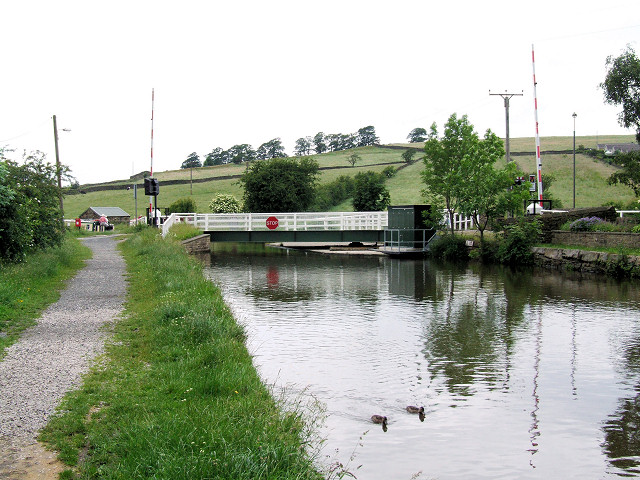
The automated swing bridge across the Leeds and Liverpool Canal

The name Bradley derives from the Old English brādlēah meaning 'broad wood or clearing'.

The Leeds and Liverpool Canal passes through the village. The Bradley section of the canal was completed in 1775. Upon entering the village there is a swing bridge crossing the Leeds and Liverpool Canal. A coal business was eventually established on the left of the swing bridge, complete with a wharf and weighbridge, while a coal stay and canal wharf occupied a large area to the right. Coal barges pulled by boat were a regular sight.

Bradley Mill constructed in the 1860s was renovated into 28 homes in 2005, developed by Novo Homes.

The primary school, Bradleys Both Community Primary School, was built in 1914. The name derives from the fact that the village is divided into two parts – Low Bradley and High Bradley.

On 22 April 2007, a Polish war memorial was unveiled by the canal, in memory of seven Polish airmen who died when their plane crashed near Skipton in 1943.

=== Industry ===
In the past, quarrying supplied slate and stone for building materials but most of the villagers were engaged in hand looming and wool combing in their own homes.

In the mid-1860s, industry started to develop in Bradley in the form of spinning and weaving mills. Weaving was carried out at Rose Shed Mill, which was redeveloped into Browns Court in the late 1990s.

== See also ==
- Listed buildings in Bradley, North Yorkshire
