= Craven District =

Geographic area in North Yorkshire, England

Craven
- Shown within North Yorkshire
- Coordinates: 53.95°N 2.02°W
- Sovereign state: United Kingdom
- Constituent country: England
- Region: Yorkshire and the Humber
- Ceremonial county: North Yorkshire
- Admin. HQ: Skipton

Government
  - MPs: Julian Smith

Area
  - Total: 454.59 sq mi (1,177.39 km^{2})

Population (2021)
  - Total: 57,090
  - Density: 125.6/sq mi (48.49/km^{2})
- Time zone: UTC+0 (Greenwich Mean Time)
  - Summer (DST): UTC+1 (British Summer Time)
- ONS code: 36UB (ONS); E07000163 (GSS)
- Ethnicity: 97.4% White; 1.8% S.Asian (2011)
- Website: cravendc.gov.uk

Craven was a non-metropolitan district in the west of North Yorkshire, England, centred on the market town of Skipton. The name Craven is much older than the modern district and encompassed a larger area. This history is also reflected in the way the term is still commonly used, such as by the Church of England.

From 1974 until 2023, the name Craven was used for a separate local government district, formed originally as the merger of Skipton urban district, Settle Rural District and most of Skipton Rural District; all were historically in the West Riding of Yorkshire. Since 1 April 2023, the area has formed part of the new North Yorkshire Council unitary authority. The population of the Local Authority area at the 2011 Census was 55,409; it comprised the upper reaches of Airedale, Wharfedale, Ribblesdale, and includes most of the Aire Gap and Craven Basin.

== History ==
Craven: “The exact extent of it we nowhere find”

— Thomas Cox, 1730

Craven has been the name of this district throughout recorded history. Its extent in the 11th century can be deduced from The Domesday Book but its boundaries now differ according to whether considering administration, taxation or religion.

=== Toponymy ===
The derivation of the name Craven is uncertain, yet a Celtic origin related to the word for garlic (craf in Welsh) has been suggested as has the proto-Celtic *krab- suggesting scratched or scraped in some sense and even an alleged pre-Celtic word cravona, supposed to mean a stony region.

In civic use the name Craven or Cravenshire had, by 1166, given way to Staincliffe. However, the church archdeaconry retained the name of Craven.

=== Prehistory ===
The first datable evidence of human life in Craven is c. 9000 BC: a hunter's harpoon point carved out of an antler found in Victoria Cave. Most traces of the Mesolithic nomadic hunters are the flint barbs they set into shafts. Extensive finds of these microliths lie around Malham Tarn and Semerwater. Flint does not occur in the Dales, the nearest outcrop is in East Yorkshire. On higher ground microliths are found near springs at the tree line at 500 m (1,600 ft) indicating campsites close to the open hunting grounds. The valley woodlands were inhabited by deer, boar and aurochs, the higher ground was open grassland that fed herds of reindeer, elk and horse. No permanent settlements have been found of that age, hunting here was seasonal, returning to the plains in winter.

Neolithic farmers permanently settled in Craven, bringing domesticated livestock and used those stone axes to clear woodlands, probably by slash-and-burn, to increase areas for grazing and crops.

Neolithic stone axes made from prized Group VI (Great Langdale and Scafell Pike area) greenstone have their quarry of origin in Langdale in central Cumbria. Archaeologists, when mapping the distribution of finds of these axe heads, saw lines radiating from Langdale along the valleys of the Yorkshire Dales, suggesting, to them, a trading network whereon itinerant pedlars or travelling salesmen practised merchandising. However, it has been proposed that such economic activity is a projection of the 21st century CE onto the people of the 38th century BCE; a culture whose world view we may never understand. New methods of spatial analysis show that the location of axe heads coincides only with areas of higher population density, wherein the movement of greenstone items would have occurred very slowly, over many centuries, through local exchange between neighbours, or as spiritual gifts. The map of finds of Langdale axe heads shows only that Neolithic settlements extended along the valleys over a long period of time.

=== Roman occupation ===
In the first century the Romans, having trouble controlling the Brigantes in the Yorkshire Dales, built forts at strategic points. In Craven one fort, possibly named Olenacum, is at Elslack 53°56′27″N 2°06′58″W. Through this fort passes a Roman road linking two other forts: Bremetennacum at Ribchester Lancashire and another at Ilkley Yorkshire. Archaeologists describe the road as running north-east up Ribblesdale about 0.6 miles (1 km) east of Clitheroe, then bending eastwards near 53°53′35″N 2°20′29″W, then about 0.6 miles (1 km) north of Barnoldswick to pass into Airedale through the low 144 m (472 ft) pass near Thornton-in-Craven.

=== Anglo-Saxon ===
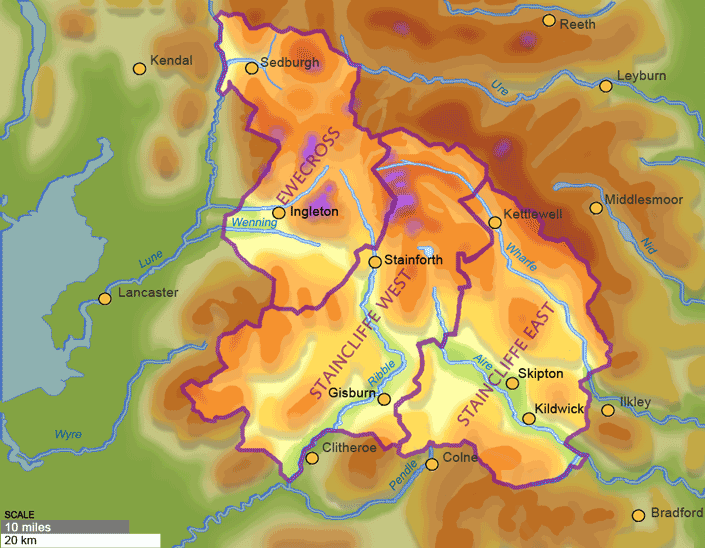
Map of the Wapentakes c. 1000 AD

To collect the Danegeld in 991–1016 the Anglo-Saxons divided their territory into tax districts. The Wapentakes of Staincliffe and Ewcross covered the region we call Craven but also areas beyond it such as the Forest of Bowland in Lancashire; and Sedbergh in Cumbria to the North. The Church was still using these areas in the 16th century.

=== Norman Conquest ===
The farmlands were progressively taken from the Anglo-Scandinavian farmers and given by the King to selected Normans. The previous and subsequent landowners were recorded in the Domesday Book along with the area of the ploughland.

==== The Domesday Book ====
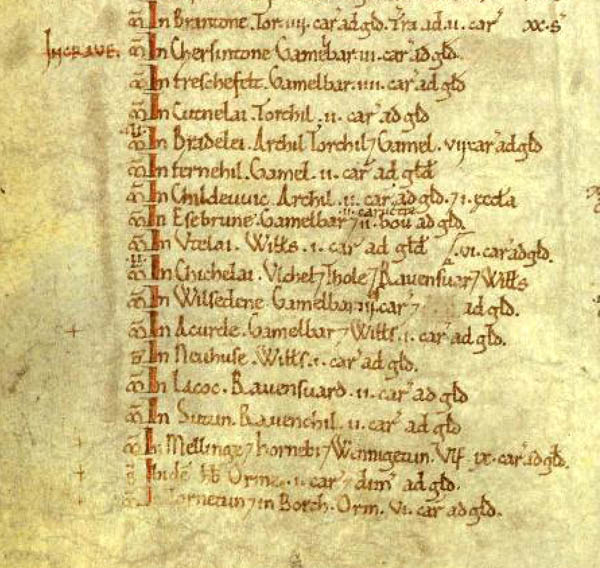
The Domesday Book, on folio 301v, lists the arable land In Craven

The Great Domesday Book of 1086 did not use the later Wapentake district names in this part of England, as it usually did, but instead used the name Craven. The Book included lands further west than any later description: Melling, Wennington and Hornby on the River Lune in Lonsdale and even Holker near Grange over Sands in Cumbria.

The historic northwestern boundary of Craven is much disputed. One faction declares that before the Norman Conquest the North of England from coast to coast was administered from York as the southern Earldom of Northumbria or Earldom of York (not to be confused with the northern Earldom of Northumbria based at Bamburgh). By 1086 the Normans had designated only one county in the North of England and that was Yorkshire. One may assume thereby that the Norman Yorkshire of 1086 was much the same as the Earldom of York of 1065; and the Domesday Book supports this. However the opposing faction proposes that Norman Yorkshire was smaller, much as it was up till 1974, and that Amounderness, Cartmel, Furness, Kendale, Copeland and Lonsdale were attached to it in the Domesday Book merely for administrative convenience.

Also the Domesday Book does not describe the width of Craven at all, for only arable land was noted. Ploughing is a minor part of Craven agriculture, and cultivators then had been reduced by the Harrying of the North. Most of Craven is uncultivable moorland and the valley bottoms are usually boggy, shady frost-hollows, with soils of glacial boulder clay very heavy to plough. So ploughing was limited to well-drained moderate slopes. The higher slopes are so full of rock debris that grazing cattle still is the primary living in Craven, with some sheep marginal. Because grazing land was not tallied in the Domesday Book the full areas of the estates of the manors can only be induced

The areas of ploughland were counted in carucates and oxgangs: one carrucate being eight oxgangs and one oxgang varying from fifteen to twenty acres. This vagueness comes from an oxgang signifying the land one ox could plough and that varied with the heaviness of the local soil. A carucate was the area that could be managed with team of eight oxen.

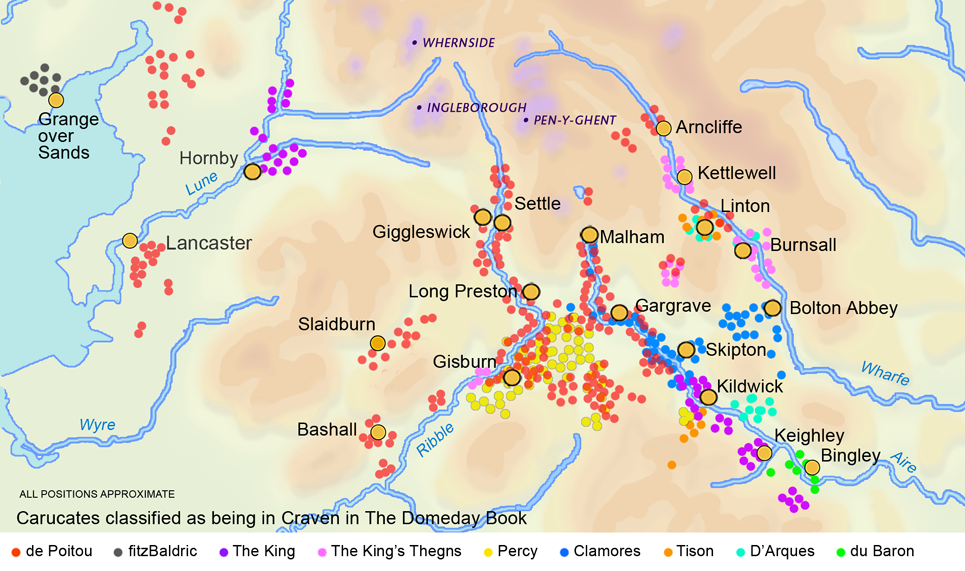
The Domesday Book of 1086 lists the lands in Craven ascribed to various Norman Lords

In 1086 Roger of Poitou was Tenant-in-chief of the western side of Craven: Ribblesdale and the Pendle valley. In 1092 he was granted also Lonsdale to defend Morecambe Bay against Scottish raiding parties.

Soon after Henry I of England's succession to the crown in 1100 arose a rebellion of men with a variety of grievances. Several Yorkshire lords were involved and suffered confiscation of their estates. In Craven these were Roger the Poitevin, Erneis of Burun and Gilbert Tison. The King conducted a reorganization of Yorkshire by establishing men more skilled in government. Shortly after 1102 the castleries in Cravenshire were divided between the House of Romille and the House of Percy. The King was clearly intent that Cravenshire should retain a compact structure for he added-in estates from his own demesne. The result was two partially interwoven castleries incorporating nearly all the land in Craven. The Percy estates were mainly concentrated in Ribblesdale with their castle at Gisburn while the Romilles dominated upper Wharfedale and upper Airedale with their fortress at Skipton Castle.

==== 14th century ====
Craven was still suffering from Scottish raiders; for example in 1318 they severely damaged churches as far south as Kildwick.

In 1377, in the form of Poll Tax records, the earliest surviving detailed statistics of Craven were collected. From them we can compare the income brackets of various occupations, and the relative worth of villages. The records list every hamlet and village using the wapentake system. The Wapentakes of Staincliffe and Ewcross cover Craven but also areas beyond such as Sedbergh to the North. Young King Richard II had commanded that poll tax to pay off the debts he had inherited from the Hundred Years' War. Its first application in 1377 was a flat rate and the second of 1379 was a sliding scale from 1 groat (4p pence) to 4 marks. However, the third tax of 1381 of 4 groats (1 shilling) and up was applied corruptly and led to the Great Rising of 1381.

==== 16th century ====
The Deanery of Craven had similar boundaries to the Wapentake of Staincliffe and so included the following areas which are not in the modern secular district of Craven:

- A large part of what is now the City of Bradford, namely the parishes Keighley, Addingham, and the Silsden and Steeton with Eastburn parts of the parish of Kildwick. However all of Bingley and part of Ilkley, though never part of Staincliffe Wapentake, were within Craven and are also now within Bradford. (They were in the upper division of the Wapentake of Skyrack.)
- The northern section of the modern Lancashire District of Ribble Valley, including Gisburn in Craven, and the Bowland Forest parishes of Bolton by Bowland, Slaidburn and Great Mitton, the latter including Waddington, West Bradford, and Grindleton. (Sawley, while not technically in the old Deanery, is also in this geographical area.)
- The north-eastern section of the modern Lancashire district of Pendle, including Barnoldswick, Bracewell, and the part of the old parish of Thornton in Craven which includes Earby and Kelbrook

==== 17th century hearth tax ====
These valuable records also define the area by wapentakes. This tax was introduced by the government of Charles II at a time of serious fiscal emergency, and collection continued until repealed by William and Mary in 1689. Under its terms each liable householder was to pay one shilling for each hearth within their property, due twice annually at the equinoxes, Michaelmas (29 September) and Lady Day (25 March). The Yorkshire records of all three ridings are now completely transcribed, analyzed and available free online

=== History of agriculture ===
==== Sheep ====
The hills and slopes of Craven are greatly involved in the history of sheep particularly in the history of wool. After 5000 BC the Neolithic farming movement introduced domesticated sheep, but the Roman occupation of Britain introduced advanced sheep husbandry to Britain and made wool into a national industry. Craven was made accessible by major roads from Ribchester up Ribblesdale and from York through Ilkley. The extent of a Roman villa farm excavated at Gargrave implies it practiced grazing on nearby moorland. By 1000 AD England and Spain were recognized as the pinnacles of European sheep wool production. About 1200 AD scientific treatises on agricultural estate management began to circulate amongst the Cistercian monasteries in the Yorkshire dales. These indicated the way to greatest profit was to produce wool for export.

“The famous monasteries under the steep, wooded banks of Yorkshire dales began the movement that in the course of four or five hundred years converted most of North England and Scotland from unused wilderness into sheep-run.”

— George MaCaulay Trevelyan, 1926

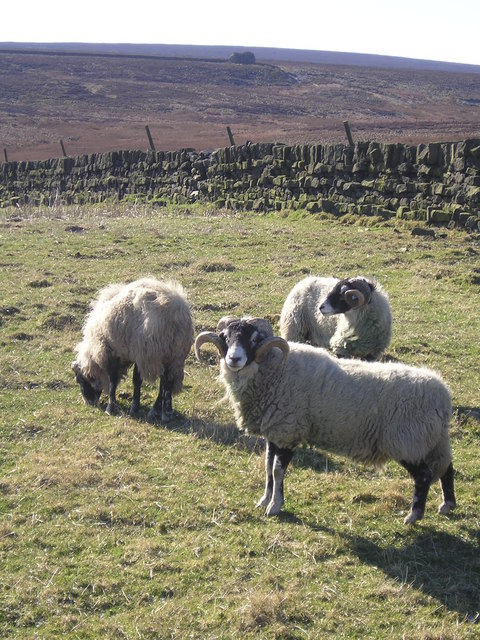
The mediaeval monasteries converted unused wilderness into sheep farms

Fountains Abbey strongly affected Craven in upper Wharfedale, Airedale and Littondale. In 1200 the Abbey owned 15,000 sheep in various locations and traded directly with Italian merchants. On the limestone fells it held extensive sheep runs managed by granges located at valley heads to access both the moors and the rough pasture of valley sides. Many granges developed into hamlets. The Fountains' sheep administrative centre was at Outgang Hill, Kilnsey. By 1320 Bolton Priory's flock at Malham was about 2,750 and it built extensive sheep farm buildings there. Accounts show that a quarter of its cheese was sheep's cheese, and that most of the Priory's came from wool sales. It also developed fulling, sorting and grading into industries. Feudal Lords began to imitate monastic management methods for their own estates and in 1350 when the Black Death killed off half the rent-paying farmers they had the bailiffs substitute sheep-pasture for tillage. The export of wool to the Flanders looms, and the concurrent growth of cloth manufacture in England, aided by Edward III's importation of Flemish weavers to teach his people the higher skill of the craft, made demand for all the wool that English flocks could supply. As the profitability of wool further increased some landowners converted all arable land into sheep pasture by evicting whole villages. Over 370 deserted medieval villages have been unearthed in Yorkshire. Henry VIII in 1539 suppressed the Monasteries and sold Littondale and the Bolton Priory's estates in lower Wharefedale and Airedale to Henry Clifford, 1st Earl of Cumberland and Lord of Skipton. By 1600 the wool trade was the primary source of tax revenue for Queen Elizabeth I. Britain's success made it a major influence in the development and spread of sheep husbandry worldwide.

In more modern times the Industrial Revolution brought factory production of wool cloth to towns further down Airedale and many Craven families, made redundant by agricultural machinery, moved south to work in the worsted mills. However, in 1966 the price of wool fell by 40% due to the increased popularity of synthetic fibres. Farmers complain it now costs more to shear a sheep than you can get for its wool and the result is reduced flocks. Although the tough wool of hill sheep is still used for carpet weaving, sheep breeding is now mostly for lambs to sell on for fattening for meat in low pastures.

==== Forestry ====
The small surviving areas of ancient woodland in the area have high biodiversity value. However, the Pennines are now notably lacking in trees despite archaeological evidence showing 90% was woodlands before human settlement. Palynology indicates the decline in trees coincided with the increase in grasses in Neolithic times caused by direct clearance for pasture and by overgrazing.

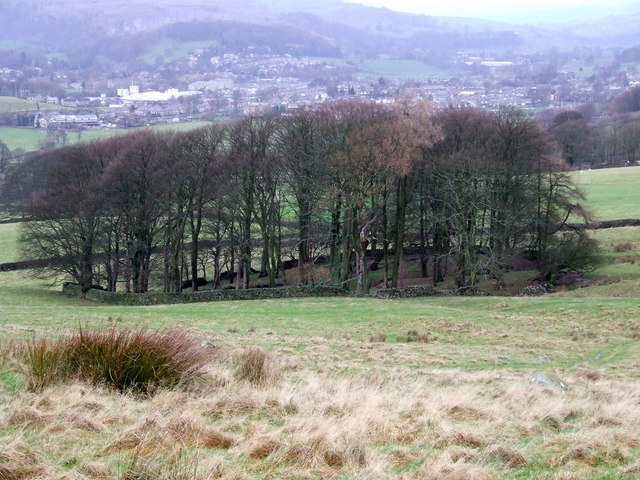
Woodland, for it to endure, must be enclosed to protect its re-growth from grazing

Since sheep are grazers, not browsers, they do not affect mature trees, but they devour all their seedlings. With a much narrower face than cattle, they crop plants very close to the ground and with continuous grazing can overgraze land rapidly. Ancient Common Grazing rights made it impossible to grow trees, even for fuel, because coppicing requires enclosure to protect regrowth from sheep, and the rights deny enclosure.

From 2002 to 2008, a Yorkshire Dales National Park programme encouraged sheep farmers to switch uplands livestock from sheep to cattle since they do not graze so intensively. Traditional breeds such as Blue Greys and Belted Galloways can survive the harsh winters and live off the rough grasses just as well as sheep. Until December 2013, The National Park's Farming and Forestry Improvement Scheme offered grants to help farming, forestry and horticultural businesses become more efficient, more profitable and resilient whilst reducing the impact of farming on the environment.

Since 1968, some moorland has been reforested by the Forestry Commission. Since 2005, the collection of indigenous seeds and propagation produced saplings for planting schemes that began in 2010. Between 2007 and 2013 The Dales Woodland Restoration Programme funded the creation of 450 hectares of new native woodland, almost all on privately owned land.

==== Cattle ====
In the 16–17th century Craven prized Longhorn cattle both for beef and their high butterfat milk that makes fine cheeses

In the 16th and 17th centuries Longhorn cattle prevailed in Craven. Good quality bulls were bought communally to improve the livestock on the common land beside each village. In the 18th century they crossbred with Shorthorns; fully grown crossbreeds weighed 420 lb (190 kg) to 560 lb (250 kg).

Some graziers of the Craven highlands also visited Scotland, for example Oban, Lanark and Stirling, to purchase stock to be brought down the drove roads to the cattle-rearing district. In the summer of 1745 the celebrated Mr Birtwhistle had 20,000 head driven from the northernmost parts of Scotland to Great Close near Malham, a distance of ca 300 miles (483 km).

In 1818 the Craven Heifer, bred for meat on the Bolton Abbey estate remains to this day the largest and fattest cow of her age ever shown in England, weighing 2,496 lb (1,132 kg).

In modern times dairy farming has predominated and after the 1970s Holstein Friesians became the most popular breed weighing ca 1600 pounds (725 kg).

==== Crops ====
Pollen analysis shows that the peak of arable agriculture in Craven was 320–410 AD, but outbreaks of pestilence in the 6th century and in the 7–8th century resulted in a shift away from ploughing to grazing. However, the Anglo-Saxon Chronicle records the Danish Viking settlers "were engaged in ploughing and making a living for themselves." Cultivation lynchet terraces and ridge-and-furrow fields of the Middle Ages are visible alongside many villages particularly in Wharfedale and Malhamdale and tithe records show they grew crops of oats, barley and wheat and in rotation, beans and peas. However, the wool boom of the 16th century caused most arable land to be turned into pasture. In the 18th century miller's records show they had to import wheat to grind and sell as flour but the farmers still grew oats for it formed the principle article of their subsistence, some made into bread and puddings but mostly cooked as oatcakes.

“We were browt up on haverbreead and cheese”

— Mr J Postlethwaite, 1940

==== Administration ====
In the 18th century the national Board of Agriculture commissioned a survey of agriculture in the region, with a view of improving it. It was published in 1793 as General view of the Agriculture of the West Riding of Yorkshire, a 140-page book detailing every factor. The wide variety of soil composition resulted in tithes ranging from 6 shillings up to 3 pounds per acre and farms leasing from 50 to 500 pounds per year. It details by parish quantities of cattle and crop produced, their rotation and market value. The report recommended more wheat and turnips; more sheep and of better breed; criticized poor drainage and design of farm buildings and taught principles of farm management.

Average wages then paid to employees were 12 pounds per annum with victuals and drink; and to temporary labourers 2 shillings and sixpence per day with beer. Hours of work in winter were "dawn till dark" and in harvest time "six till six, with one hour for dinner and another for drinking". The author shows concern for their virtue and welfare.

=== Craven Museum ===
Craven Museum opened in 1928 and is dedicated to the history of the Craven district. Housed in Skipton Town Hall since 1973, the museum holds artefacts relating to Craven from prehistory to present day, including geological, archaeological, industrial and agricultural collections.

== Government ==
=== Parliamentary constituency ===
Since 1983 Craven has been in the Parliamentary constituency of Skipton & Ripon. This constituency is considered one of the safest seats in England with a long history of Conservative representation. The Member of Parliament (MP) was: John Watson 1983 to 1987; David Curry 1987 to 2010; Julian Smith since 2010.

=== Local authority ===
In July 2021 the Ministry of Housing, Communities and Local Government announced that in April 2023, the non-metropolitan county of North Yorkshire would be reorganised into a unitary authority. Craven District Council, the other district councils and North Yorkshire County Council were abolished on 1 April 2023 and their functions were transferred to a new single authority for the non-metropolitan county of North Yorkshire.

== Previous local authorities ==
=== Former County Council ===
North Yorkshire County Council administered an area of 8,654 square kilometres (3,341 mi^{2}), the largest county in England. It was a non-metropolitan county that operated a cabinet-style council in Northallerton. The 72 councillors therein elected a council leader who appointed up to 9 councillors to form an executive cabinet. NYCC Elections – 2017 results

==== District divisions ====
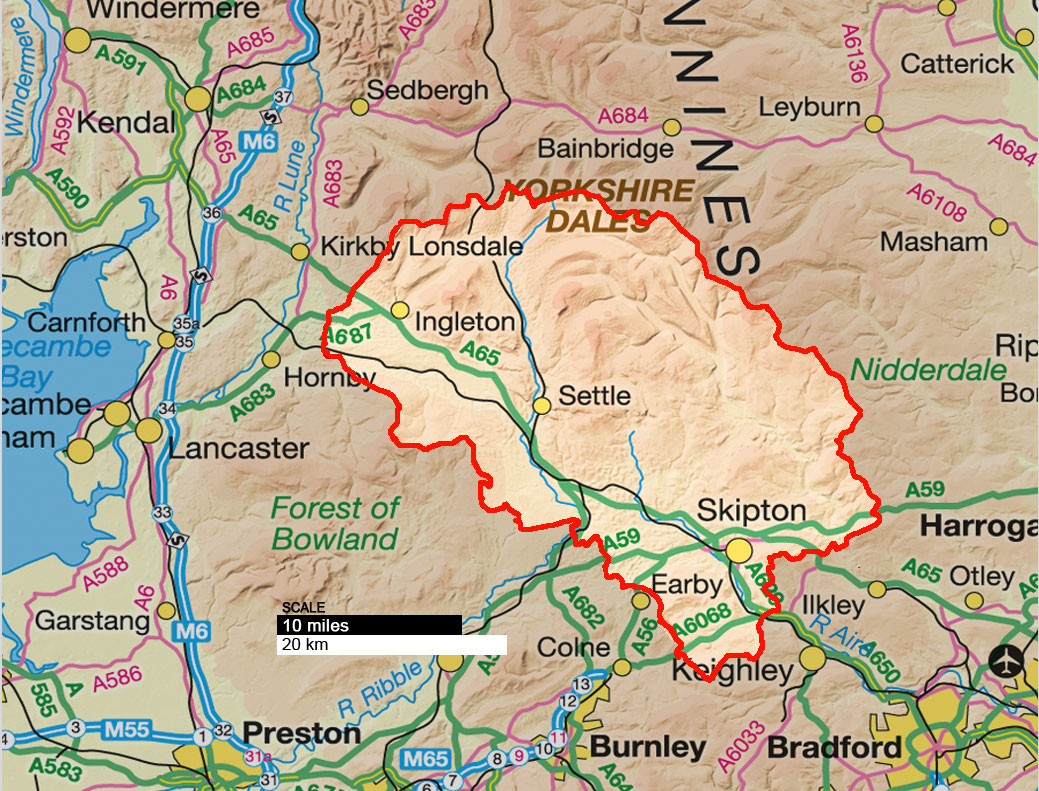
The Craven Local Government District 1974–2023

Craven, for representation on North Yorkshire County Council, was divided into seven divisions and each returned one councillor.

1. Airedale
2. Mid-Craven
3. North Craven
4. Ribblesdale
5. Skipton East
6. Skipton West
7. South Craven

=== Former District Council ===
Logo of former District Council

Elections to Craven District Council were held in three out of every four years, with one third of the 30 seats on the council being elected at each election. Since the first election to the council in 1973 the council had alternated between periods when no party had overall control and times when the Conservatives had a majority, apart from a 2-year period between 1996 and the 1998 election when the Liberal Democrats had a majority. After no party had a majority since 2001, the Conservatives regained overall control at the 2010 election and held it until abolition in 2023.

==== District council wards ====
There were 76 Civil Parishes in Craven.

They were grouped into 19 wards. The Wards were represented by 30 councillors; eight wards by one councillor and eleven by two councillors..

The wards were:

1. Aire Valley with Lothersdale Ward : Parishes of Bradleys Both, Cononley, Farnhill, Kildwick, Lothersdale (two councillors)
2. Barden Fell Ward : Parishes of Appletreewick, Barden, Beamsley, Bolton Abbey, Bordley, Burnsall, Cracoe, Draughton, Hazlewood-with-Storiths, Halton East, Hetton, Rylstone, Thorpe.
3. Bentham Ward : Parishes of Bentham and Burton-in-Lonsdale (two councillors)
4. Cowling Ward : Parish of Cowling.
5. Embsay with Eastby Ward : Parish of Embsay with Eastby.
6. Gargrave and Malhamdale Ward : Parishes of Airton, Bank Newton, Calton, Coniston Cold, Eshton, Flasby-with-Winterburn, Gargrave, Hanlith, Kirkby Malham, Malham, Malham Moor, Otterburn, Scosthrop, Stirton-with-Thorlby (two councillors)
7. Glusburn Ward : Parish of Glusburn and Cross Hills (two councillors)
8. Grassington Ward : Parishes of Grassington, Hebden, Hartlington, Linton.
9. Hellifield and Long Preston Ward : Parishes of Hellifield, Long Preston, Nappa, Swinden.
10. Ingleton and Clapham Ward : Parishes of Austwick, Clapham-cum-Newby, Ingleton, Lawkland, Thornton-in-Lonsdale. (two councillors)
11. Penyghent Ward : Parishes of Giggleswick, Horton-in-Ribblesdale, Stainforth.
12. Settle and Ribble Banks Ward : Parishes of Halton West, Langcliffe, Rathmell, Settle, Wigglesworth (two councillors)
13. Skipton East Ward : Parish of Skipton (two councillors)
14. Skipton North Ward : Parish of Skipton (two councillors)
15. Skipton South Ward : Parish of Skipton (two councillors)
16. Skipton West Ward : Parish of Skipton (two councillors)
17. Sutton-in-Craven Ward : Parish of Sutton-in-Craven (two councillors)
18. Upper Wharfedale Ward : Parishes of Arncliffe, Buckden, Conistone-with-Kilnsey, Halton Gill, Hawkswick, Kettlewell-with-Starbotton, Linton, Threshfield.
19. West Craven Ward : Parishes of Broughton, Carleton, Elslack, Martons Both, Thornton-in-Craven.

=== Allied organisations ===
Craven District Council allied with other organizations:

- North Yorkshire County was a two tier local authority area, with NYCC being the top and Craven District Council the bottom tier. Whilst CDC was responsible for providing some services NYCC was responsible for others.
- The Leeds City Region is the economic area comprising Craven, Harrogate, York, Bradford, Leeds, Selby, Calderdale, Kirklees, Wakefield and Barnsley. LCR members work together in fields such as transport, housing and spatial planning.
- North Yorkshire Strategic Partnership is a partnership of public sector, private sector and voluntary organizations in Craven working together to meet the needs of the communities.
- North Yorkshire Children's Trust, part of the NYSP, represents all those agencies that working with children and young people across the county. NYCT promotes the five national Every Child Matters outcomes for children.
- York and North Yorkshire Cultural Partnership brings together a number of Yorkshire agencies that bring the benefits of culture to quality of life and economic regeneration. This partnership is working together to deliver the York and North Yorkshire Cultural Strategy 2009–2014.
- Welcome to Yorkshire works to improves what the region has to offer tourists.

== Alternate uses of Craven ==
=== West Craven ===
In the 1974 government reorganization of the shire districts, some towns were lost to Lancashire, but because of cultural history some of them, all now part of the borough of Pendle, came to be known as West Craven: Barnoldswick, Earby, Sough, Kelbrook, Salterforth and Bracewell and Brogden. (Other more westerly parts of Craven that became parts of Ribble Valley in modern Lancashire, such as Gisburn, are not normally referred to as part of West Craven.)

=== Archdeaconry of Craven ===
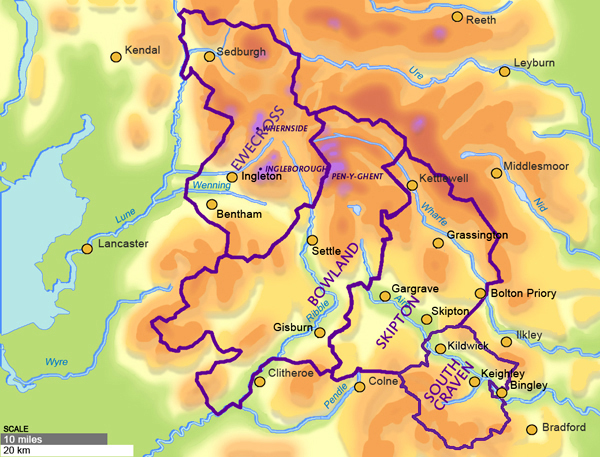
The Archdeaconry of Craven is much larger than civic District of Craven

The Anglican Church Archdeanry number 542 is named Craven and has four Deaneries: Ewecross, Bowland, Skipton and South Craven. Ecclesiastic Craven is much larger than the civic District of Craven; in particular northern Ewecross is in Cumbria county, lower South Craven is in West Yorkshire, and south-west Bowland is in Lancashire county. The Church of England has considered changing their boundary of Bowland to match that of civic Lancashire

=== Deanery of South Craven ===
The Deanery of South Craven is much bigger than the council election division of South Craven, as the Deanery of South Craven comprises the following parishes: Cononley, Cowling, Cross Roads cum Lees, Cullingworth, Denholme, East Morton, Harden, Haworth, Ingrow, Keighley (St Andrews), Kildwick, Newsholme, Oakworth, Oxenhope, Riddlesden, Silsden, Steeton with Eastburn, Sutton-in-Craven, Thwaites Brow, Utley and Wilsden. The Civic boundaries also contrast in that only Bradley, Cowling, Kildwick and Sutton-in-Craven are in North Yorkshire; the other 16 are in West Yorkshire.

==== South Craven and Wharfedale ====
South Craven is in the Archdeaconry of Bradford, and on 1 January 2017 The Church of England put into effect a redrawing of the map of its subdivisions of the Bradford Episcopal Area by geographic re-grouping This geographic departmentalization into four new deaneries is an effective mind map, whereby South Craven is now grouped by regional geography with similar parishes so they can work together more effectively.

"We needed to create a new deanery structure, as two of our existing deaneries had been divided across different episcopal areas and were significantly smaller than the others"

— Rt. Revd Toby Howarth, Bishop of Bradford, 2017

Whereas South Craven was previously grouped with "Ilkley and Keighley" it is now adjoined to Wharfedale as South Craven and Wharfedale. The Deanery of South Craven and Wharfedale now includes: Addingham; St John Ben Rhydding; Burley Woodhead; St John the Evangelist, Cononley with Bradley; Cowling; Ilkley All Saints; St Margaret Ilkley; Kildwick; Christ Church Lothersdale; St John the Divine, Menston; St James Silsden; and St Thomas Sutton-in-Craven.

== Towns ==
The largest town in Craven is Skipton. Other major population centres in the region include High Bentham, Settle, Grassington. The expanded villages of Sutton-in-Craven, Cross Hills and Glusburn are now considered one urban conglomerate.

== Geography ==
Craven comprises the upper reaches of Airedale, Wharfedale, Ribblesdale and the river Wenning of Lonsdale.

=== Topography ===
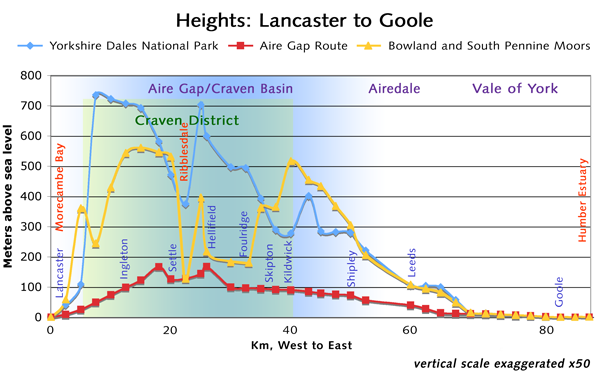
Cross-section of the topography of England, coast to coast. In red is shown the altitudes of the valley called the Craven Basin or the Aire Gap. In particular the A683 from Lancaster on the tidal waters of the Irish Sea, via Ingleton on the A65 to Skipton and then on any major road beyond to Goole where the River Ouse is tidal from the North Sea. This Craven Basin or Aire Gap contrasts with the heights of the mountains of the Yorkshire Dales National Park to the north marked in blue, and also contrasts with the heights of the Forest of Bowland and the South Pennine Moors to the south marked in yellow.

Craven is a group of valleys. Through Craven the River Aire and River Wharfe flow east to the North Sea; and the River Ribble and River Wenning flow west to the Irish Sea.

To Craven's north stand limestone mountains of up to 736 m (2,415 ft) above mean sea level and to its south lie bleak sandstone moors, that above 275 m (902 ft) grow little but bracken.

Transport can find the Pennines a formidable barrier for roads can be blocked by snow for several days. However, Craven makes a sheltered passageway with low passes.

=== Natural vegetation ===
At the end of the last ice age, ca 11,500 years ago, plants returned to the bare earth and archaeological palynology can identify their species. The first trees to colonize were willow, birch and juniper, followed later by alder and pine. By 6500 BC temperatures were warmer and woodlands covered 90% of the dales with mostly pine, elm, lime and oak. On the limestone soils the oak was slower to colonize and pine and birch predominated. Around 3000 BC a noticeable decline in tree pollen indicates that Neolithic farmers were clearing woodland to increase grazing for domestic livestock, and studies at Linton Mires and Eshton Tarn find an increase in grassland species in Craven.

On poorly drained impermeable areas of millstone grit, shale or clays the topsoil gets waterlogged in Winter and Spring. Here tree suppression combined with the heavier rainfall results in blanket bog up to 2 m (7 ft) thick. The erosion of peat ca 2010 still exposes stumps of ancient trees.

“In digging it away they frequently find vast fir trees, perfectly sound, and some oaks...”

— Arthur Young, 1771

Vegetation in the Pennines is adapted to subarctic climates, but altitude and acidity are also factors. For example, on Sutton Moor the millstone grit's topsoil below 275 m (902 ft) has a soil ph that is almost neutral, ph 6 to 7, and so grows good grazing. However, above 275 m (902 ft) it is acidic, ph 2 to 4, and so can grow only bracken, heather, sphagnum, and coarse grasses such as cottongrass, purple moor grass and heath rush. However dressing it with lime produces better quality grass for sheep grazing. Such is named marginal upland grazing. This suggests that early pastoral farming on millstone grit soil flourished in areas where lime was most easily available.

== Demography ==
- The population is increasing and growing older. By 2020 Craven's population is projected at 63,400, an increase of 14.2% (2006 based sub-national population projections ONS)
- 95.6% of the Districts population is white British, with ethnic minority (BME) groups making up 4.4% (Mid Year 2006 Population Estimates, Experimental Statistics ONS).
- Young people aged 19 and under make up 22% of the population, those aged 20 to 64 make up 56%, and those aged 65 and over 22% (Mid Year 2008 Population Estimates, ONS)
- 17.23% of the population consider themselves to have a long-term limiting illness or disability (2001 Census Statistics ONS).

== Economy ==
Businesses by industrial sector in 2008
Sector	Quantity	%
Manufacturing	213	7.2
Construction	369	12.5
Distribution, Hotels and Restaurants	972	32.8
Transport and Communications	157	5.3
Banking, Finance and Insurance	760	25.6
Public Admin, Education and Health	271	9.1
Other	221	7.5

Economic forecasts for 2010 show that the Craven District's diverse economy, measured in Gross Value Added (GVA), is worth £1.14 billion ($1.87 billion) Since 1998 the value of the District's economy has grown by 45%. Craven hosts a variety of small businesses – 72% employ less than four people. Businesses that employ above 50 employees (2.2%) are mostly in the south of the District.

- The visitor economy sector has the largest number of businesses.
- The banking, finance and insurance sector has experienced significant growth since 2003 mainly through the Skipton Building Society group.
- Agriculture and land-based industries form a significant part of the District's economy, particularly within the remoter areas.
- Manufacturing has declined since 2003 but is still a key sector: Major manufacturers are Systagenix Wound Management.

=== Traditional mainstays ===
==== Agriculture ====
The business of agriculture revolves around the market towns of Craven:

The market days of Craven
Market town	Street market	Farmers	Crops auction	Cattle auction	Other livestock
Bentham	Wed	1st Sat	–	Wed: primestock	1st Tues: dairy, sheep, seasonals
Ingleton	Fri	inactive	–	–	–
Settle	Tues	2nd Sun	–	–	–
Gisburn	–	–	Thur: hay and straw	Thur: prime, dairy, sheep	1st and 3rd Sat: breeding, store
Grassington	inactive	3rd Sun	inactive	inactive	inactive
Skipton	Mon Wed Fri Sat	1st Sat	Mon: crops and produce	Mon: prime, dairy, sheep	1st and 3rd Wed: store, pedigree

AHDB, the national Agriculture and Horticulture Development Board, issues regional reports with constant updates on agricultural output:

- CATTLE: For example, at Skipton Auction Mart on one day 108 cattle were sold including 55 prime steers, 53 heifers, 2 young bulls and 21 older heifers (July 2011). In June 2013 the top price by weight was 185.5p/kg for two Aberdeen Angus-cross heifers at £1,075 ($1,681) per head.
- SHEEP: For example, at Skipton Auction Mart in one day 985 lambs and 278 ewes/rams were sold (July 2011). In June 2013 the top price by weight for lambs was 240.8p/kg at £94 ($147) per head); rams fetched a top price of £79.50 ($124) per head and sheep averaged £47.10 ($73) per head.
- SHEEP DOGS auctions for working dogs are held seasonally at Skipton and Bentham. The world record price was broken in 2011 with £6,300 ($10,270) for Dewi Fan and again in May 2016, when Cap was sold at Skipton for £16,000.
- DAIRY: Traditionally Craven milk is mostly sold as cheese. North Yorkshire in 2008 had 649 holdings with 71,518 dairy cows aged over 2 years. Average annual milk yield is 7,406 litres/cow. Wholesale production of milk for all of North Yorkshire 2009/10 was 488,894,588 litres.

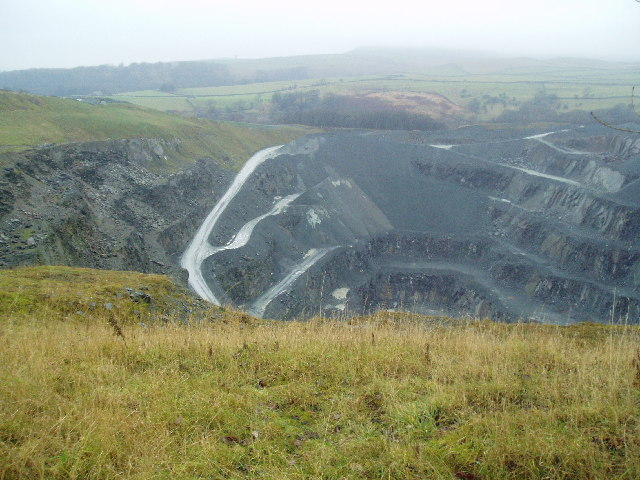
Quarry near Ingleton

Two thirds of Craven lie within the Yorkshire Dales National Park where traditional landscape preservation is required.

==== Quarrying ====
Silurian gritstone is quarried along the North Craven Fault above Ingleton and in Ribblesdale. Lower Carboniferous Great Scar Limestone is quarried in those areas and also near Grassington. Carboniferous reef limestone is quarried around Skipton.

=== Employment ===
Employment by occupation
Occupation	%
Sales and customer service	6
Personnel services	7
Process: Plant	8
Administration	10
Elementary	12
Professional occupations	12
Associate Professionals	12
Skilled Trades	16
Managers and senior officials	17

Employees by industrial sector 2008
Sector	Quantity	%
Agriculture	362	1.4
Manufacturing	2,602	9.8
Construction	1,759	6.6
Distribution, Hotels and Restaurants	7,383	27.8
Transport and Communications	781	2.9
Banking, Finance and Insurance	7,522	28.3
Public Administration, Education and Health	5,357	20.1
Other	825	3.1

In 2008 there were 26,591 employed; 22% were self-employed. In 2010 each Full Time Equivalent (FTE) employee contributed £40,311 to the District's economy, representing an increase in productivity of 21.9% since 1998; an annual increase of 1.8%. The value of output per capita (estimated to be £19,703) has increased by 32% since 1998.

== Transport ==
There are no motorways in the area. It was shown by a national detailed Land Use Survey by the Office for National Statistics in 2005, that Craven has the least proportion of land taken up by roads of any district in England: 0.7%. This compared with a maximum of over 20% in four London boroughs and the City of London.

=== Passes ===
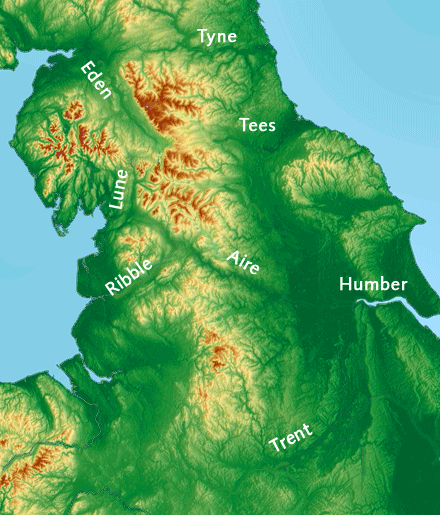
The central Pennines can be easily traversed by low passes: * Airedale to Ribblesdale 144 m (472 ft) near Barnoldswick. * Airedale to Pendle Water 165 m (541 ft) near Colne. * Ribblesdale to Lonsdale 166 m (545 ft) near Settle.

Transport can find the Pennines a barrier on occasion when some roads are blocked by snow for several days. Craven is of great significance to the North of England for by its topography it provides low-altitude passes through "the backbone of England". They were especially significant for the railway and canal builders. The lowest passes through the Pennines are:

- The Airedale to Ribblesdale pass near Barnoldswick is 144 m (472 ft) at Thornton-in-Craven 53.93413°N 2.16276°W
- The Airedale to Ribblesdale pass near Settle is 160 m (525 ft) just East of Hellifield 54.00000°N 2.16667°W a point labelled Aire Gap on some maps.
- The Airedale to Pendle Water pass near Colne is 165 m (541 ft) at Foulridge 53.8768°N 2.176420°W also sometimes called Aire Gap.
- The Ribblesdale to Lonsdale pass near Settle is 166 m (545 ft) at Giggleswick Scar 54.074167°N 2.318056°W

The nearest alternative pass through the Pennines is Stainmore Gap (Eden-Tees) to the North, but that is not in Craven's league for it climbs to 420 m (1,378 ft) and its climate is classed as sub-arctic in places.

The nearest low-level routes across the country are over 62 miles (100 km) away: the 228 m (748 ft) Tyne Gap to the north, or the A619 road in Derbyshire to the south.

=== Main routes ===
- A59 road: York, Harrogate, Skipton, Barnoldswick, Clitheroe, Preston, Liverpool
- A65 road: Ilkley, Skipton, Settle, Ingleton, Kendal
- A629 road: Skipton, Keighley, Halifax, Huddersfield, Rotherham
- A56 road: Earby, Colne, M65 motorway, Burnley, Manchester, Chester
- Train: Skipton railway station to Leeds on the Airedale Line
- Train: Skipton railway station to Morecambe on the Leeds–Morecambe line
- Train: Settle railway station to Carlisle or Leeds on Settle–Carlisle line

==== A59 York–Liverpool ====
The A59 road runs along the southern edge of Airedale to Ribblesdale. It runs about 0.62 miles (1 km) north of a disused Roman road through Craven that took the lowest pass through Thornton-in-Craven.

==== A56 Skipton–Chester ====
The route now known as the A56—-M65 first developed c. 1773–1816 as the Leeds and Liverpool Canal to carry heavy industrial goods like masonry stone, limestone, and coal. The planned route into Ribblesdale was via a lower level pass but the Industrial Revolution in Nelson and Colne made it seem more profitable to change their route to Foulridge near Colne despite it being the highest pass.

==== A629 and A65 Keighley–Kendal ====
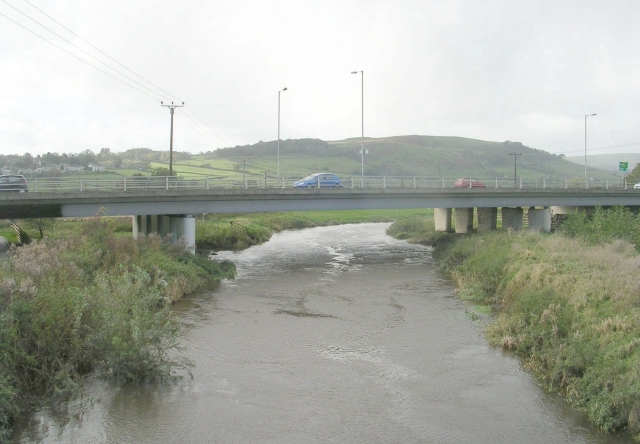
The new A629, built 1968–88, bypasses Kildwick village

The route of the A65 road is perhaps the oldest for it follows a Neolithic trade route for stone axes from central Cumbria. By the 18th century the principal exports were cattle and most imports came on ninety pack horses from Kendal. The cost of that for heavy goods was prohibitive so the textile industrialist of Settle campaigned that the road from Keighley to Kendal be made passable to wheeled vehicles and in 1753 the Keighley and Kendal Turnpike Trust was founded. By 1840 passenger stagecoaches ran daily but in 1878 Parliament abolished all Turnpikes and set up County Councils; and the management of the main roads was transferred to them.

By 1968 traffic had so increased in volume that it necessitated the rebuilding of the A629 and A65. The Skipton northern bypass of 1981 cost £16.4 million. The Kildwick bypass was completed in 1988.

== Education ==
=== Educational attainment ===
The proportion of the working age population with high levels of educational attainment is above the national average, and 40% of the District's residents have managerial and professional occupations. Also Lantra's Landskills offers workshops in efficiency and profitability in agriculture, horticulture and forestry with up to 70% funding. Craven is covered in Farm Business Support and Development and Yorkshire Rural Training Network. Yet from 2004 to 2009 there was generally a decline in attainment of about 12% and the number of people in the District with no qualifications increased by 1.8%. Such people have reduced employment options, however Craven College in Skipton is one of the largest Further Education Colleges in North Yorkshire and provides an outreach service to rural areas.

=== Museums ===
Craven Museum & Gallery in Skipton is one of three museums in the district. It has obtained funding to deliver various projects:

- The Phoenix Project; delivered in partnership with the three other museums in Craven increased accessibility of collections.
- The Archaeology in the Landscape project, targeting young people, families and the disadvantaged, delivers events, workshops, demonstrations and education programmes to 3,460 young people and over 17,000 adults.
- The Young Archaeologists Club programme delivered museum education to approx 3,000 students 2009–2010.

As part of the projects above Craven Museum & Gallery staff worked with both the Museum of North Craven Life, The Folly in Settle and the Grassington Folk Museum.

=== Arts ===
Craven District supports arts through music, theatre, dance, literature, visual arts and festivals. Funding from the Arts Council England (Yorkshire) alone totalled £435,811 between 2006 and 2009. Grants from other sources including the Gulbenkian Fund and Esme Fairburn Trust totalling well over an additional £160,000. A new exhibition gallery was opened in 2005 at Craven Museum & Gallery, Skipton, which now hosts a programme of exhibitions each year.

== Media ==
In terms of television, the district is covered by BBC Yorkshire and ITV Yorkshire broadcast from the Emley Moor TV transmitter. However, north western parts of the district including Settle is served by BBC North West and ITV Granada which broadcast from the Winter Hill TV transmitter.

BBC Local Radio for the district is served by BBC Radio York on 104.3 FM and BBC Radio Lancashire on 104.5 FM. County-wide commercial station are Greatest Hits Radio Yorkshire (formerly Stray FM) on 107.8 FM and community based stations are Drystone Radio on 103.5 FM and Dales Radio (covering Settle and Ingleton) on 104.9 FM.

The district's local newspaper is the Craven Herald & Pioneer.

== Sport ==
Craven Council opened the Craven Pool and Fitness Centre in 2003 and extended it in 2007. The Centre reached the semi-finals in the Best Semi Best Sports Project category of The National Lottery Awards. The Craven Active Sports Network develops opportunities for participation in sport and active recreation, sourcing funding for a variety of projects throughout the District, totalling over £14.5 million in 2001–2011. The National Sport Unlimited Scheme, delivering a programme of sporting activity to 1,205 young people and teenagers, brought in £45,000 of external funding.

== Notable people ==
In 1665 Lady Anne Clifford, 14th Baroness de Clifford, owned and restored Skipton Castle.

In 1548 William Craven of Appletreewick was born to a modest family in Appletreewick near Skipton. At age 14 he was sent to London to apprentice to a Watling Street tailor. He qualified in 1569 and made such a fine impression that in 1600 he was made Alderman of Bishopgate; in 1603 he was knighted by James I and in 1610 he was chosen Lord Mayor of London. He is sometimes referred to as "Aptrick's Dick Whittington" suggesting that the story of Dick Whittington is based on his life. William made benefactions to Craven, founding the school in Burnsall.

One of William's sons, John Craven, founded the famous Craven Scholarships at Oxford and Cambridge Universities and in 1647 left many large charitable bequests to Craven towns including Burnsall and Skipton.

In 1660 William's first son William Craven was made the first Earl of Craven by Charles II. However, that title was eponymous for the estate was in Uffington, Berkshire so he was in no sense a lord of Craven Yorkshire.

The botanist George Caley (1770–1829) was born in Craven.

== Gallery ==
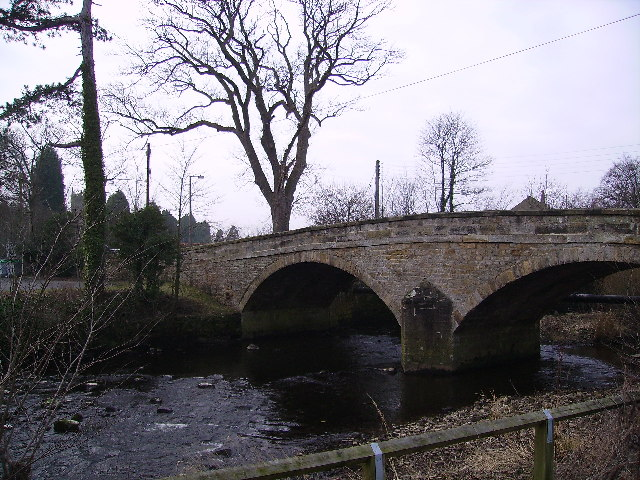
River Wenning passing The Punch Bowl in Low Bentham

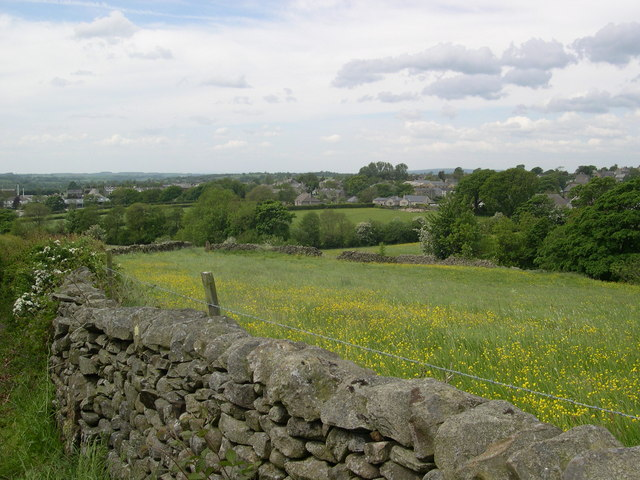
View of High Bentham from the Heritage Trail

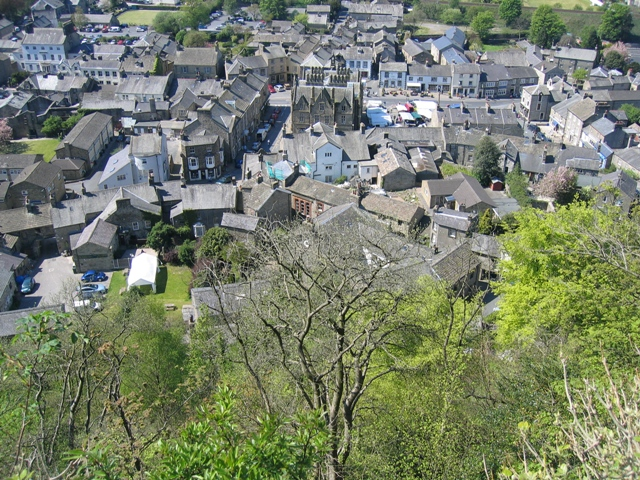
View of Settle from Castlebergh, a 300 feet (91 m) limestone crag

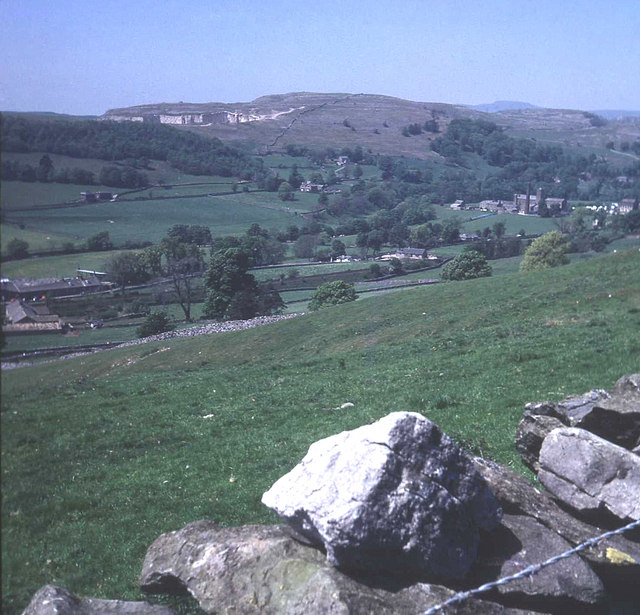
View back across the Ribble to Giggleswick Scar

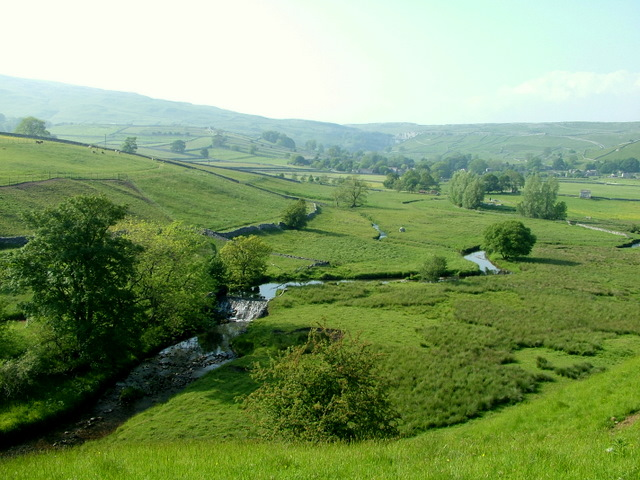
Airedale South of Malham

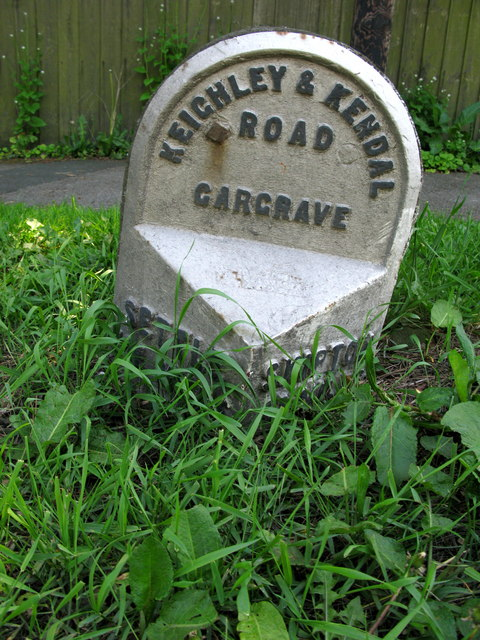
Gargrave's milestone on the Keighley and Kendal Turnpike, 1753–1878

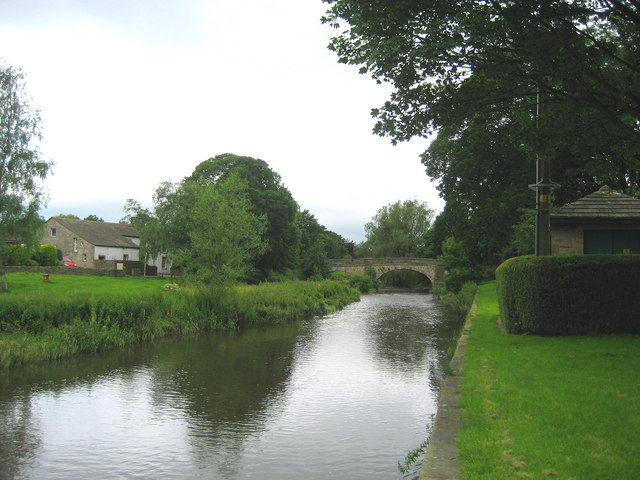
The River Aire at Gargrave

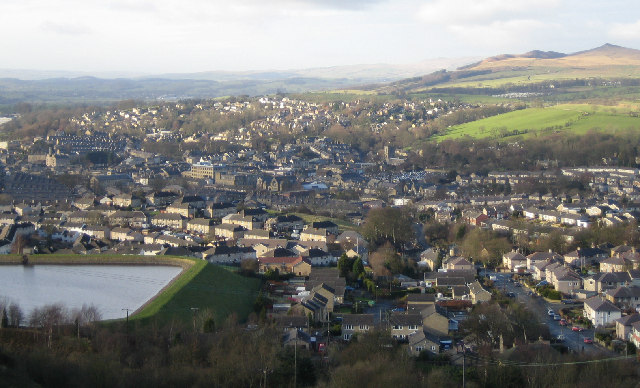
View of Skipton from Skipton Moor

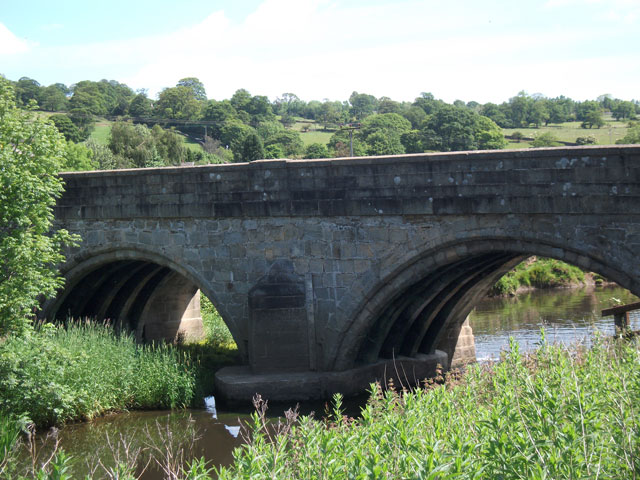
Kildwick Bridge west side built 1305–1313 with ribbed vaulting

== See also ==
- List of places of worship in Craven
