= Ewecross =

Former administrative area of Yorkshire, England

Coordinates: 54.173°N 2.198°W

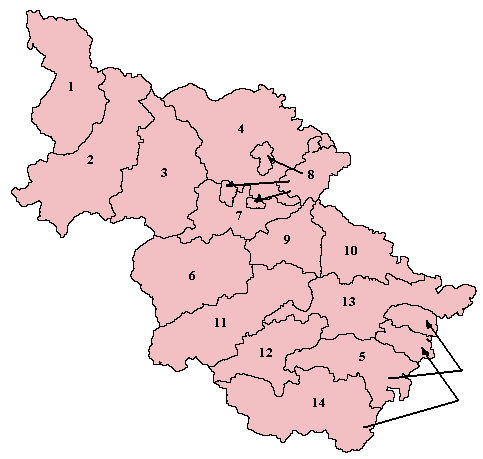
Wapentakes of the West Riding, England. Ewecross is labelled 1 on the map.

The historical area of Ewecross or Ewcross is a district in the West Riding of Yorkshire, England. It included the parishes of Bentham, Clapham, Horton in Ribblesdale and Sedbergh and parts of Thornton in Lonsdale. Ewcross was split from the Staincliffe and Ewcross wapentake in the nineteenth century covering an area which was 25 miles (40 km) north to south (from Settle to Westmorland), and 11 miles (18 km) west to east.

In modern times the name has been used for one of the area deaneries under the Archdeacon of Richmond and Craven in the Anglican Diocese of Leeds. In 2017 it amalgamated with Bowland to become the Deanery of Bowland and Ewecross.

Since 1974 the area of the wapentake has been divided between the counties of North Yorkshire and Cumbria.
