= Church of St Andrew, Kildwick =

Anglican church in North Yorkshire, England

Church of St Andrew
- Lang Kirk of Craven
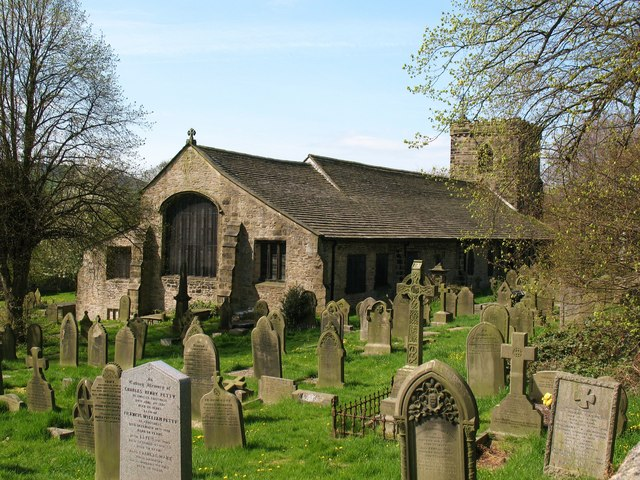
- Church of St Andrew
- 53.9091°N 1.9842°W
- OS grid reference: SE 01144 45893
- Location: Kildwick, North Yorkshire
- Country: England
- Denomination: Anglican
- Website: https://kcb.church

History
- Status: Open
- Dedication: St Andrew

Architecture
- Functional status: Major parish church
- Heritage designation: Grade I
- Style: Decorated; Perpendicular

Administration
- Diocese: Leeds
- Archdeaconry: Bradford
- Deanery: South Craven and Wharfedale
- Parish: Kildwick, Cononley and Bradley

Clergy
- Vicar: Mike Green

Listed Building – Grade I
- Designated: 10 September 1954
- Reference no.: 1132175

The Church of St Andrew is an Anglican parish church in the village of Kildwick, North Yorkshire, England. A church has been in Kildwick since at least 950 AD, though the current structure dates back to the 16th century, but in its oldest parts are c. 12th century. The church was one of only two being recorded in Craven at the time of the Domesday survey, and was historically known as the Lang Kirk of Craven as it is unusually long for a parish church. It has a split graveyard, with a small portion to the north of the Leeds Liverpool Canal, and the larger graveyard to the south of the canal surrounding the church.

== History ==
There is archaeological evidence to prove that a house of worship existed within the area which is now Kildwick as far back as 950 AD; blocks from the Saxon era were discovered in the walls during the renovations of 1901–1903. By the time of the Domesday Survey, Kildwick is one of only two places in the Deanery of Craven which is noted for having a church. (Note: The only other place mentioned in Domesday to have a church in the Craven area is Long Preston. However, whilst only Long Preston and Kildwick are named as having churches, it is thought that this was deemed worthy of inclusion by the surveyors; other settlements may have had churches at this time.) Sometime around the 12th century, the church was given by Cecillia de Romille to the priory at Bolton Abbey, though not long afterwards, Archbishop Thurstan claimed it, and it remained under the minster at York until the Dissolution, when the advowson was given to the college of Christ Church in Oxford.

The church building dates back to the 14th century, but the four west bays have 12th century origins. After the Battle of Bannockburn in 1314, the Aire and Wharfe valleys were progressively sacked by Scottish raiders c. 1318, though it is thought that the church was spared being completely destroyed on account of the church's dedication to St. Andrew. Brereton points out that the area of Kildwick (and the wider Craven district) was ravaged in 1317, but history does not record any serious damage to the church. However, the rebuilding of the church took place in 1320, with the tower, parts of the aisles, and the nave, also all being built sometime on the 14th century. It was noted in the 19th century that the eastern side of the tower bore the marks of a roof pitched at a higher level than the one the church then had.

At some point during the 16th century during the reign of Henry VIII, the church was lengthened, and it measured 145.5 feet (44.3 m) by 48.5 feet (14.8 m), making it the longest church in the Deanery of Craven, and one of the longest churches in Yorkshire. (Note: Others give the length of the church as 146 feet (45 m), Pevsner stated it to be 165 feet (50 m) and Speight detailed it to be 176 feet (54 m).) The church has since acquired the nickname of the Lang church in Craven, due to it being lengthened considerably, but it is unsure as to why the church was lengthened, there being no considerable increase in the population. (Note: Various forms of the nickname have been used; Long church in Craven, Lang Kirk i' Craven etc.) Additionally, the church floor is entirely on the same level from the base of the tower to the altar. A plan was prepared by an architect in 1881 to amend this at a cost of £685 (equivalent to £72,000 in 2025), but this was never implemented. The south porch was rebuilt in 1873, and both south doorways were amended in 1868 so that the levels of the floor of the church and the doorways were at the same height.

The tower, which was renovated in 1860, has two stages, a door in the west side, above which is a Perpendicular style window with three panes (lights). The parapets of the tower are embattled and there is a square turret on the north-east side. Above the tower doorway is a stone carved with a face that dates back to before the Conquest. It is thought to have been found during renovations and used within the tower walls between the doorway and the window above it. The long church is composed of ten bays, six of which belong to the nave, and four to the chancel, with bays 1 to 4 in the nave being of a Decorated architectural nature, whilst many of the piers and arches are Perpendicular in nature.

The font is of Norman origin, and until 1825, had a carved oak canopy above it until 1825, when a restoration to the west gallery necessitated its removal. At the west end of the nave is the effigy of Sir Robert Styveton (Sir Robert of Steeton), who was a Knight Templar. The Styveton's were an ennobled family of high military note who lived at Steeton. The effigy is made from stone quarried near Tadcaster (known as Hazlewood Stone), the same used in the walls of York Minster.

The church was restored in 1873 by the Lancaster partnership of Paley and Austin. Changes have taken place since then, including extension of the chancel and a further restoration of the nave in 1901–03 by the successors in the Lancaster practice, Austin and Paley, costing £4,200 (equivalent to £442,000 in 2025). These renovations found parts of Anglo-Saxon crosses and their shafts embedded in the 16th century walls. Many of these artefacts are on display in the church.

The church also possesses an unusual cope which is made from a Chinese royal garment, and on display in the church is a hand-written letter from Florence Nightingale, thanking parishioners for the gifts they sent to soldiers serving in Crimea. The church was grade I listed in 1954, and celebrated its 700-year anniversary in 2020.

=== Parish, benefice, and rectors ===
Historically, the church and parish was part of the old Deanery of Craven, but it is now in the Deanery of South Craven and Wharfedale, in the Diocese of Leeds and the Benefice of Kildwick, Cononley and Bradley. The parish in the 16th and 17th centuries stretched over both banks of the nearby River Aire, having a boundary in the north with Skipton, Bingley and Keighley in the south, and with Whalley in the west. It was bordered by the parish of Addingham in the east and Kildwick itself had no daughter churches.

The ancient parish of Kildwick was joined with that of Cononley with Bradley in 2019 to create the parish of Kildwick, Cononley & Bradley, under the stewardship of the Priest in Charge of both parishes, Julie Bacon, who left her post to be an associate Archdeacon in Sheffield Diocese. In 2022, Mike Green, the first vicar of the parish of Kildwick, Cononley & Bradley was inducted and installed.

In 2021, St Andrew's was designated as a major parish church. The criteria for this designation is that the church is open daily, that it is a grade I or II* listed building, is exceptionally large for its community, and that it makes a "considerable civic, cultural, and economic contribution to their community." The designation also allows the churches designated as major parish churches to access further revenue streams for improvements.

Notable historical rectors at Kildwick include John Webster, Roger Brereley who founded the Grindletonians, and William de Gargrave (or William of Gargrave) who, along with the prior of Bolton Abbey, was required to fight at the Battle of Myton.

== Listed status and graveyard ==
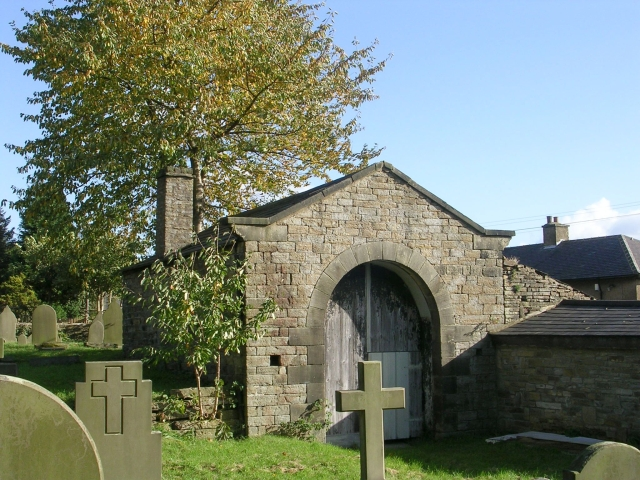
Hearse House

Besides the church itself which is grade I listed, there are five other structures within the church grounds, or associated with the church, and all are grade II listed:

- Gates, overthrow and gate piers approximately 20 metres west of Church of St Andrew
- South gates overthrow gatepiers [sic] and steps to Church of St Andrew
- Stocks approximately 5 metres east of south gates to church. (Speight states that these were last used in 1860).
- Sundial Shaft in Garden of Rememberance [sic]
- Hearse House approximately 20 metres south east of Church of St Andrew

The footbridge over the canal at the north-west of the church is called Parson's Bridge, and is grade II listed. The building of the canal in the early 1770s, split the graveyard in two and separated the church from the vicarage, so the story is that the incumbent vicar at that time, John Dehane, insisted a bridge be built to allow him access to the church. Initially, Dehane was offered 45 Shillings per acre of land by the builders of the canal, but he refused this and asked them to re-evaluate the compensation.

The whole church and churchyard lie within the Kildwick Conservation Area, which was approved in 1989. The graveyard contains a burial plot with a stone-carved organ in the middle. This is to commemorate the Laycock family who were organ builders, their last involvement in the organ-building business was in 1970 as Laycock and Bannister.

== See also ==
- Grade I listed buildings in North Yorkshire (district)
- Listed buildings in Kildwick
