= Steeton =

Steeton may refer to:

- Steeton, North Yorkshire, a civil parish of North Yorkshire
- Steeton, West Yorkshire, a village within the civil parish of Steeton with Eastburn
  - Steeton and Silsden railway station, serving Steeton, West Yorkshire
- Steeton with Eastburn, a civil parish of West Yorkshire, England
