= Listed buildings in Farnhill =

Farnhill is a civil parish in the county of North Yorkshire, England. It contains nine listed buildings that are recorded in the National Heritage List for England. Of these, one is listed at Grade I, the highest of the three grades, and the others are at Grade II, the lowest grade. The parish contains the village of Farnhill and the surrounding area. The Leeds and Liverpool Canal runs through the parish, and the listed buildings associated with it are a bridge and an aqueduct. The other listed buildings are houses, a milestone and a barn.

== Key ==
Grade	Criteria
I	Buildings of exceptional interest, sometimes considered to be internationally important
II	Buildings of national importance and special interest

== Buildings ==
Name and location	Photograph	Date	Notes	Grade
Farnhill Hall; 53.91436°N 1.99647°W	—	15th century	A manor house that has been much altered, in stone with a slate roof, hipped on the right. In the centre is a two-storey block with four embattled turrets, one at each corner, which is flanked by wings. Above the doorway is a small gabled dormer with machicolations, and the windows include a surviving pair of lights with trefoil heads.	I
15, 17 and 19 Newby Road; 53.90971°N 1.98631°W		Late 17th to early 18th century	Two cottages and a shop in stone, with quoins, a stone slate roof, and two storeys. No. 15 contains a doorway with a moulded surround and an elliptical head, above which is an initialled panel, and the windows have double-chamfered surrounds. The doorway of No. 17 has a plain surround, and the cottage contains double-chamfered mullioned windows. No. 19 has a plain doorway, a shop window, and a mullioned window above.	II
Crag Top Farmhouse; 53.91517°N 1.98620°W	—	Late 17th to early 18th century	The farmhouse is in stone with quoins and a stone slate roof. There are two storeys, a main block with two bays, and a lower block also with two bays. The doorway has a chamfered surround, and the windows are double-chamfered with mullions.	II
Stonegate Cottage; 53.91231°N 1.98580°W		17th or early 18th century	A stone house that has been altered, with quoins, a stone slate roof and two storeys. It contains a doorway with a chamfered surround. The windows vary and include a sash window, a fixed light, and mullioned windows.	II
The Mullions; 53.90973°N 1.98602°W		Early 18th century	The house is rendered and has chamfered quoins, a moulded string course, a cornice and a stone slate roof. There are two storeys and five bays. The central doorway has an eared architrave, and the windows are mullioned and transomed.	II
Milestone; 53.91347°N 1.99014°W		18th century (probable)	The milestone at the junction of Main Street and Grange Road consists of a roughly squared stone with two faces. On one face is the distance to Skipton and on the other face to Keighley.	II
Farnhill Bridge; 53.91590°N 1.99861°W		c. 1770–73	The bridge carries Main Street over the Leeds and Liverpool Canal. It in stone and consists of a single semi-elliptical arch. The bridge has voussoirs, arch soffits, a string course, and square coping with a slight ridge. The wings are swept, and end in piers.	II
Aqueduct; 53.90956°N 1.98603°W		c. 1774	The aqueduct, designed by John Longbotham, carries the Leeds and Liverpool Canal over Newby Road. It consists of a single arch forming a tunnel 50 metres (160 ft) long. There are solid stone parapets, and the soffit is canted at each end.	II
Barn, Farnhill Hall Farm; 53.91568°N 1.99514°W		1835	A long barn that has a stone slate roof with coped gables and ball finials. In the centre is a segmental-headed entry, and elsewhere are square windows and vents. At the left end is an outshut containing a re-set double-chamfered mullioned window.	II
