= Farnhill Hall =

Historic building in North Yorkshire, England

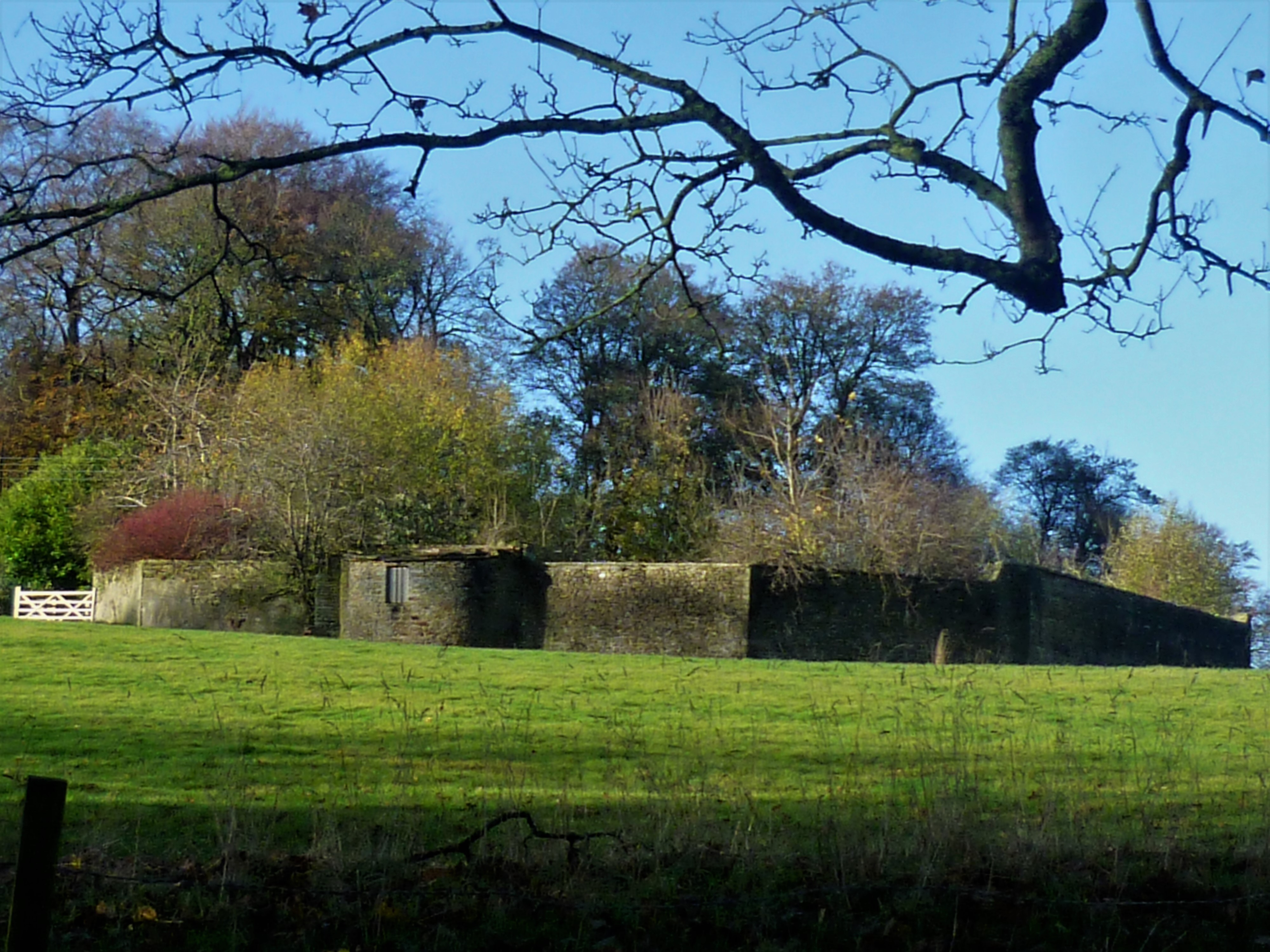
- Farnhill Hall walled garden
- Interactive map of the Farnhill Hall area

General information
- Architectural style: Medieval fortified manor
- Location: Farnhill, North Yorkshire
- Coordinates: 53°54′52″N 1°59′47″W

Height
- Roof: Stone slate

Technical details
- Structural system: Sandstone rubble and ashlar

Listed Building – Grade I
- Official name: Farnhill Hall
- Designated: 10 September 1954
- Reference no.: 1131758

Farnhill Hall is a 14th-century fortified manor house in the parish of Farnhill, near Skipton, North Yorkshire, England. Constructed primarily in the early 14th century with 15th- and 19th-century alterations, it is a rare surviving example of a small, license-built medieval fortified domestic residence in Craven.

The hall was designated a Grade I listed building on 10 September 1954.

== History ==
=== Medieval origins ===
The manor of Farnhill is recorded in the Domesday Book of 1086 as part of the lands of Robert de Romille, Lord of Skipton Castle. By the late 13th century, the manor was held by the de Farnhill family.

In the early 14th century, Robert de Farnhill constructed the core of the present fortified hall, likely in response to increased Scottish raids across northern England following the Battle of Bannockburn (1314).

== History ==
=== Tudor period and the Eltoft family ===
During the late 15th and 16th centuries, the estate was held by the Eltoft family, who served as prominent regional landowners and magistrates. Edmund Eltoft expanded the hall's living quarters, replacing narrower medieval openings with larger Tudor mullioned windows while retaining the defensive corner turrets and parapets.

=== 17th to 20th centuries ===
In 1636, the hall was purchased by Henry Currer of nearby Kildwick Hall, uniting the two neighboring estates. The Currer family retained ownership for several generations, letting Farnhill Hall as a tenant farm throughout the 18th and 19th centuries. Through marriage and sale, the estate passed successively to the Eltoft, Silson, and Currer families of Kildwick during the 15th and 17th centuries.

In the 19th and early 20th centuries, the building was adapted into a farmhouse, during which period interior restoration work was carried out to stabilize the medieval masonry and repair the roofs. Farnhill Hall remains a private residence.

== Architecture ==
=== Exterior ===
Farnhill Hall is constructed from thick, local millstone grit rubble with stone slate roofs. The building is arranged on an oblong plan, flanked at the four corners by square projecting corner turrets, giving it a distinctive defensible appearance.

The walls feature battlemented parapets supported on heavy stone corbels. The south front retains 14th-century pointed-arch window openings with stone tracery, alongside insert Tudor mullioned windows from late 15th-century modifications.

=== Interior ===
The interior centres on a central medieval solar hall over a vaulted ground floor basement, originally designed for security and storage.

Notable interior features include a 14th-century stone fireplace in the upper hall featuring a heavily chamfered lintel. Also an original spiral stone staircases within the corner turrets giving access to the roof battlements. And a heavy timber roof trusses dating to the 15th-century reconstruction.

== See also ==
- Grade I listed buildings in North Yorkshire (district)
- Listed buildings in Farndale East
