= Kildwick Bridge =

Listed bridge in North Yorkshire, England

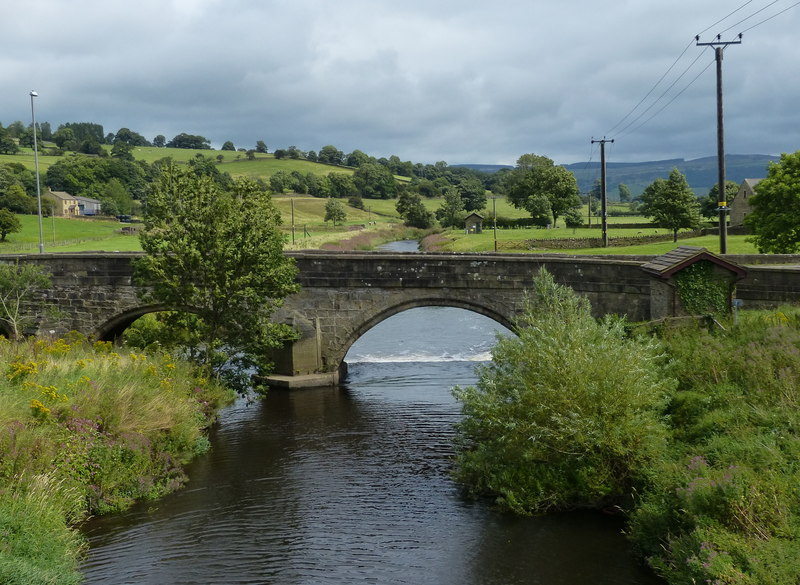
- Kildwick Bridge crossing the River Aire
- Coordinates: 53.907°N 1.984°W
- OS grid reference: SE011457
- Crosses: River Aire
- Locale: Kildwick, North Yorkshire, England
- Other name: Aire Bridge

Characteristics
- Total length: 46 yards (42 m)
- Width: 23 feet (7.0 m)
- No. of spans: 4

History
- Built: c. 1305

Statistics

Listed Building – Grade I
- Designated: 10 September 1954
- Reference no.: 1167718

Location
- Interactive map of Kildwick Bridge

Kildwick Bridge is a road bridge over the River Aire in North Yorkshire, England. It is one of the oldest documented bridges in England, with a reference dating back to 1305. It was the main route through Yorkshire to and from Skipton, later becoming part of the Keighley and Kendal Turnpike. A newer road bridge and bypass opened just upstream from the current bridge in 1988, however Kildwick bridge is still open to vehicular traffic gaining access to Kildwick village. The bridge is both a scheduled monument and a grade I listed structure.

== History ==
The River Aire at Kildwick was a crossing point in Roman times; a road is thought to have forded the Aire in the Kildwick area. The building of the bridge, which started in 1305 and took several years, is listed as costing over £21 (equivalent to £22,000 in 2025), largely paid for by the monks of Bolton Abbey for their carts to be able to cross the river. (Note: The account of the money being paid by Bolton Abbey is recorded between 1305 and 1306, but sources disagree on how long it took to build the bridge. Historic England state it was built between 1305 and 1313.) Evidence seems to suggest that the bridge was built on dry land, and then the river diverted to run underneath it, a common practice with bridge-building in those times. Although other bridges are thought to have existed over the River Aire at locations such as Leeds and Bingley, Kildwick is the oldest documented bridge on the River Aire, and one of the oldest documented Medieval bridges in England. Historically, it was the only crossing of the river for miles around, and was known throughout the area as Aire-brigg, or Ayrebridge (the Aire Bridge). The bridge is 46 yards (42 m) long and up until 1988, carried the A629 road when it was bypassed by a new trunk road and roundabout to the south, with a short spur along a newer bridge to the west; the old bridge remains open for local traffic to access the village of Kildwick itself.

The bridge has four arches, all with ribbed undersides, and of differing spans; from north to south the first span is 18 feet (5.5 m), the second is 19 feet (5.8 m), the third 29 feet (8.8 m) and the last is 33 feet (10 m). The stone used is mainly ashlar, but also some gritstone rubble, and the bridge shows signs of much repair in the stonework. Up until the late 18th century, the bridge was narrower, but during 1780, the bridge was widened on the downstream side. The widening was occasioned by the creation of the Keighley to Kendal Turnpike, and effectively created a second bridge added on to the first bridge. This added another 8 feet (2.4 m) onto the bridge making it 23 feet (7 m) wide. The two northernmost arches on the upstream side are pointed, with the remaining two wider and rounded, whilst those on the downstream side are all rounded. It was repaired in the 19th century, and then repaired and strengthened again in 1961.

The Airedale Drainage Act 1861 (24 & 25 Vict. c. clx) lowered the riverbed in several places, ostensibly to provide good drainage and free up land for agricultural purposes. This resulted in the normal river height underneath the bridge being dropped by several feet. Between 1968 and 2023, the average flow under the bridge was 235.5 cubic feet per second (6.669 m^{3}/s), but during a flooded season in February 1995, the flow reached a rate of 3,374 cubic feet per second (95.54 m^{3}/s). Cracking in the parapet stones of the bridge on Boxing Day 2015, was put down to the pressure of the water passing under the bridge. Flooding had long been recognised as a problem in the low-lying land around Kildwick Bridge; the creation of the turnpike road in the 1780s awarded a contract to a local man to build a causeway on the south side leading up to the bridge, which had small tunnels underneath to allow floodwater to pass through. However, in his Book of Bridges written in 1752, John Carr noted that the bridge had a "causey" at the southern end which measured 220 yards (200 m).

The bridge was first listed with Historic England in 1954, and is now a grade I listed structure and a scheduled monument. Jervoise described Kildwick Bridge as being "..one of the most interesting bridges in Yorkshire, if not the finest."

== See also ==
- Grade I listed buildings in North Yorkshire (district)
- Listed buildings in Kildwick

== Notes ==
Next bridge upstream	River Aire	Next bridge downstream
Kildwick Bridge (A629 road)	Kildwick Bridge; Grid reference SE0111545699	Silsden Bridge
