= Keighley and Kendal Turnpike =

Road in Northern England

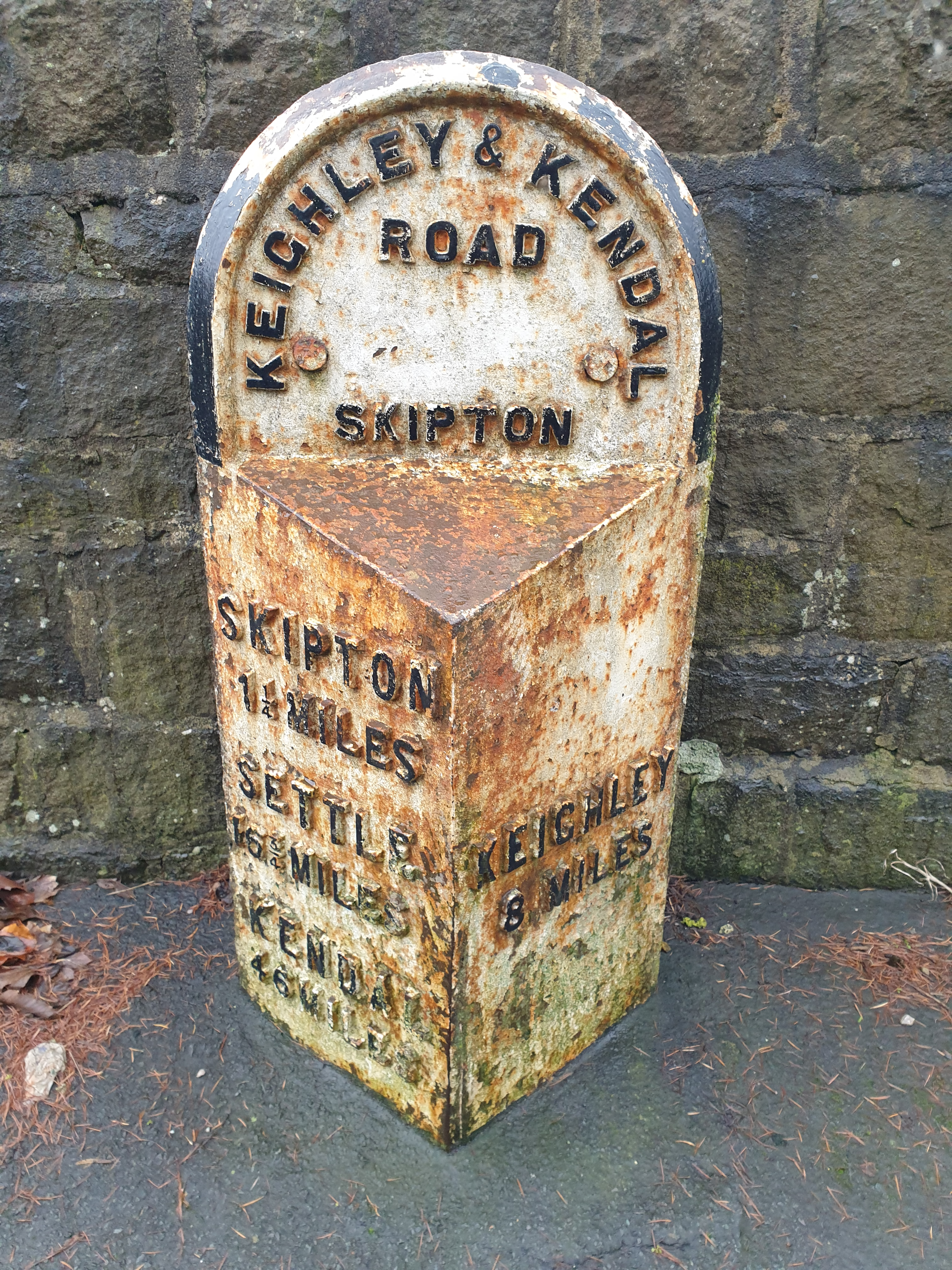
Keighley & Kendal Road
- Keighley and Kendal Turnpike

Route information
- Length: 54 mi (87 km)
- Existed: 1753–1878

Major junctions
- East end: Keighley 53.867°N 1.911°W
- Skipton - Addingham Turnpike; Skipton - Colne Turnpike; Kirkby Lonsdale - Milnthorpe Turnpike
- West end: Kendal 54.326°N 2.745°W

Location
- Country: United Kingdom

Road network
- Roads in the United Kingdom; Motorways; A and B road zones

The Keighley and Kendal Turnpike was a road built in 1753 by a turnpike trust between Keighley in the West Riding of Yorkshire and Kendal in Westmorland, England. The primary instigators were in Settle. The road followed a modified ancient route through Craven. It necessitated bridge widening, reorientation in some of the towns it passed and the relocation of inns and stables. The road was of great benefit to commerce in the northwest but proved a financial loss as the cost of repairing wear caused by heavy traffic was underestimated. The trust's records were lost when it closed.

== Old roads ==
Ancient highways were rights of way where the only road repair was removing obstructions. In some places on soft ground a raised causeway of stones one metre wide was built for pack horses. The only wide roads were drovers' roads along hilltops. All roads crossed rivers at right angles wherever the valley was narrowest. The hilly road from Knaresborough brought more trade to Settle than the valley track from Keighley. Travellers went on horseback or on foot: the principal exports were cattle and the imports came on packhorses. Bulk materials like hay, peat or rushes were dragged on sledges by oxen even when there was no snow.

The feudal right for towns to hold markets brought merchants and guilds to see value in good roads. Although common carriers' carts began carrying merchandise they were not seen for a long time north of York or west of Exeter. In these distant parts all goods were carried by trains of packhorses.

== Proposals ==
The commercial advantage in building a new road through Craven was presented in a Settle broadsheet ca 1750:

"The Woollen Manufacture has of late years been carried on and is daily increasing in Craven, for which it is better situated in every respect (save the scarcity of Coal) than any other part of the Country. Good Roads wou’d lower the Price of Coal at least one‐Third, this wou’d be a prodigious advantage to all the inhabitants, and such an encouragement to that Branch of Trade as wou’d render it General, by this means the Country wou’d become Populous and consequently the Value of Land greatly increased ... When the Roads are effectually repaired Goods may be conveyed from one Place to another in Carriages with less than half the Number of Horses now employed in carrying Packs and consequently at half the Expence."

Landowners with farm carts and private carriages were influential in obtaining the best surface possible. The proposed turnpike was 53 miles (85 km) in length and expected to earn a yearly income of £1,005 15s. 6d. sufficient for its repair. Yorkshire section of 40 3/4 miles could be constructed by 1,648 men with 744 carts; and the Lancashire/Westmorland section of 12¼ miles by 205 men with 133 carts.

== Trust ==
Yorkshire and Westmorland Roads Act 1753
- Act of Parliament
- Parliament of Great Britain
- Long title: An Act for repairing, amending, and widening, the Road from Keighley in the West Riding of the County of York, to Kirkby in Kendal in the County of Westmorland.
- Citation: 26 Geo. 2. c. 86
- Territorial extent: Great Britain

Dates
- Royal assent: 15 May 1753
- Commencement: 11 January 1753 (Note: Start of session.)
- Repealed: 8 August 1823
Other legislation
Amended by	Keighley to Kirkby Kendal Road Act 1778; Yorkshire Roads Act 1790
Repealed by	Keighley to Kirkby Road (Yorkshire District) Act 1823

Status: Repealed

Text of statute as originally enacted

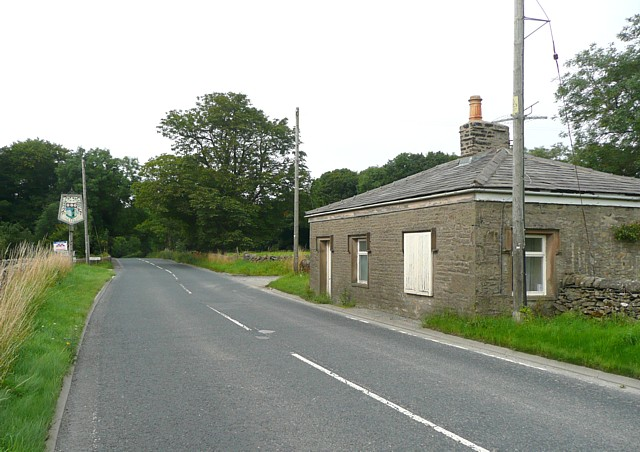
The B6480 and Turnpike House, Settle

In 1753 the campaign was successful and the Keighley and Kendal Turnpike Road Trust (KKTR) was founded in the 26th year of King George II by an act of Parliament, the Yorkshire and Westmorland Roads Act 1753 (26 Geo. 2. c. 86):

...for repairing, amending and widening the Road from Keighley in the West Riding of the County of York, to Kirkby in Kendal in the County of Westmoreland ...
...it is from the Narrowness thereof in many Places, and the Nature of the Soil, become very ruinous and in great Decay, and is not only almost impassable by Wheel Carriages, but very dangerous for Travellers, and is incapable of being repaired by the ordinary Course of Law.

More than 500 local residents were appointed trustees to carry out the necessary works and gave them power to erect turnpike gates and toll houses, levy tolls, purchase land, and administer the working of the road.

Keighley to Kirkby Kendal Road Act 1778
- Act of Parliament
- Parliament of Great Britain
- Long title: An Act for continuing the Term, and altering and enlarging the Powers of an Act, made in the Twenty-sixth Year of the Reign of His late Majesty King George the Second, intituled, "An Act for repairing, amending and widening the Road from Keighley, in the West Riding of the County of York, to Kirkby in Kendal, in the County of Westmorland."
- Citation: 18 Geo. 3. c. 113
- Territorial extent: Great Britain

Dates
- Royal assent: 28 May 1778
- Commencement: 20 November 1777
- Repealed: 8 August 1823
Other legislation
Amends	Yorkshire and Westmorland Roads Act 1753
Amended by	Yorkshire Roads Act 1790; Keighley and Kendal Road Act 1800
Repealed by	Keighley to Kirkby Road (Yorkshire District) Act 1823

Status: Repealed

Text of statute as originally enacted

Yorkshire Roads Act 1790
- Act of Parliament
- Parliament of Great Britain
- Long title: An Act for continuing the Term and altering and enlarging the Powers of certain Acts made for repairing the Road from Keighley, in the West Riding of the County of York, to Kirkby in Kendall, in the County of Westmorland; so far as relates to such Part of the said Road as lies within the County of York.
- Citation: 30 Geo. 3. c. 99
- Territorial extent: Great Britain

Dates
- Royal assent: 1 April 1790
- Commencement
- Repealed: 8 August 1823
Other legislation
Amends	Yorkshire and Westmorland Roads Act 1753; Keighley to Kirkby Kendal Road Act 1778
Repealed by	Keighley to Kirkby Road (Yorkshire District) Act 1823
Relates to	Keighley and Kendal Road Act 1800

Status: Repealed

Text of statute as originally enacted

Keighley and Kendal Road Act 1800
- Act of Parliament
- Parliament of Great Britain
- Long title: An Act for continuing for twenty-one Years, and from thence to the End of the then next Session of Parliament, the Term, and altering and enlarging the Powers of two Acts, passed for repairing, amending, and widening, the Road from Keighley, in the West Riding of the County of York, to Kirkby in Kendal, in the County of Westmorland, so far as the same relate to that Part of the said Road which lies within the Counties of Westmorland and Lancaster.
- Citation: 39 & 40 Geo. 3. c. cxi
- Territorial extent: Great Britain

Dates
- Royal assent: 9 July 1800
- Commencement: 24 September 1799
- Repealed: 6 April 1819
Other legislation
Amends	Yorkshire and Westmorland Roads Act 1753; Keighley to Kirkby Kendal Road Act 1778
Repealed by	Ireby, Kirkby Lonsdale, Kirkby Kendal and Milnthorp Road Act 1819
Relates to	Yorkshire Roads Act 1790

Status: Repealed

Keighley to Kirkby Road (Yorkshire District) Act 1823
- Act of Parliament
- Parliament of the United Kingdom
- Long title: An Act for more effectually repairing and improving the Yorkshire District of the Road from Keighley in the West Riding of the County of York to Kirkby in Kendal in the County of Westmoreland, and for making several Diversions therefrom, within the said West Riding of the County of York.
- Citation: 4 Geo. 4. c. xlix
- Territorial extent: United Kingdom

Dates
- Royal assent: 23 May 1823
- Commencement: 23 May 1823 (Note: The Acts of Parliament (Commencement) Act 1793.)
- Repealed: 8 August 1855
Other legislation
Repeals/revokes	Yorkshire and Westmorland Roads Act 1753; Keighley to Kirkby Kendal Road Act 1778
Repealed by	Keighley and Kendal Turnpike Road (Yorkshire District) Act 1855

Status: Repealed

Text of statute as originally enacted

Keighley and Kendal Turnpike Road (Yorkshire District) Act 1855 (Note: Section 2.)
- Act of Parliament
- Parliament of the United Kingdom
- Long title: An Act for maintaining the Yorkshire District of the Road from Keighley in the West Riding of the County of York to Kirkby-in-Kendal in the County of Westmoreland.
- Citation: 18 & 19 Vict. c. cliv
- Territorial extent: United Kingdom

Dates
- Royal assent: 16 July 1855
- Commencement: 8 August 1855 (Note: Section 1. The fourth Wednesday following the passing of the act.)
- Repealed: 1 November 1877
Other legislation
Repeals/revokes	Keighley to Kirkby Road (Yorkshire District) Act 1823
Repealed by	Annual Turnpike Acts Continuance Act 1877
Relates to	Repealed

Text of statute as originally enacted

In 1778 a second act of Parliament, the Keighley to Kirkby Kendal Road Act 1778 (18 Geo. 3. c. 113) separated the Yorkshire portion of the road from the rest; in 1790 a third act of Parliament, the Yorkshire Roads Act 1790 (30 Geo. 3. c. 99) revised the tolls and certain exemptions were abolished. The life of the trust was extended by further acts of Parliament, the Keighley to Kirkby Road (Yorkshire District) Act 1823 (4 Geo. 4. c. xlix), and the Keighley and Kendal Turnpike Road (Yorkshire District) Act 1855 (18 & 19 Vict. c. cliv).

The trustees' qualification was the possession of land of the annual value of £100, or property worth £3,000. They were forbidden to make any profit out of the road. They never all congregated but met in local committees with a minimum of seven attendees. The trust's minute book shows that most interest in the road came from Settle. The only active trustee of Keighley was Josias Morley, attorney. A number of wealthy men advanced money on the security of the tolls. Mr. Cripps advanced more than £5,000 between 1753 and 1756. The tolls would eventually have satisfied the creditors but the trustees, full of energy and public spirit, at once embarked on many extra improvements financed by borrowing on the security of future tolls.

== Toll charges ==
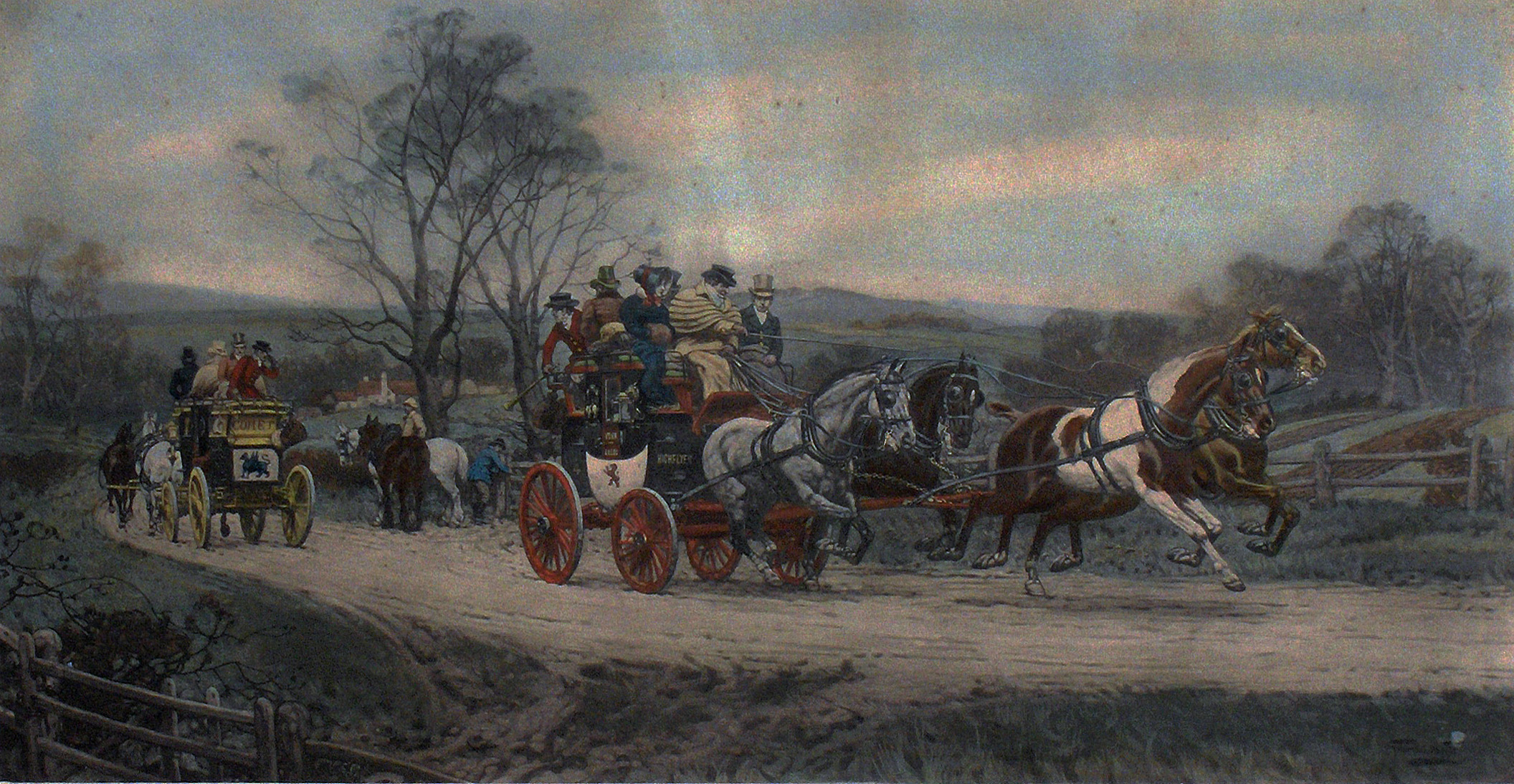
"Behind time" an anonymous engraving of a stagecoach in England

The first act of Parliament fixed the maximum toll for travellers passing from end to end. Because there were initially five toll bars the amount taken at any one bar was not to exceed one fifth of the total:

- Coach drawn by 6 horses or more, seven shillings and sixpence; and drawn by 4, five shillings; drawn by 2, three shillings and fourpence; drawn by 1 two shillings.
- Wagon or cart drawn by 6 beasts of draught, twenty shillings; by 5 or 4, five shillings; drawn by 3 or 2, three shillings and fourpence; drawn by 1, one shilling and sixpence.
- Horse or mule, not drawing, five pence each.
- Drove of cattle two shillings per score.
- Drove of calves hogs or sheep one shilling per score.
- Foot travellers free.

There were many exceptions to placate various interests. No tolls were charged on the carriage of fuel, building materials or manure; on corn taken to the cornmill; on cloth or wool taken to a fulling mill, or on livestock going to water. No tolls were charged to residents going to church on Sundays, to the funeral of a neighbour or to vote at an election, or to the Royal Mail.

== Engineering ==
In 1753 the Settle Trustees appointed Joshus Parsons, stone mason to build the road up Brayshaw Scar

"Cast 7 yards wide between the ditches, and well and equally formed in a turnpike like manner, and sufficiently raised when the grounds are low or soft; low places to be raised as much as possible and high places to be taken down to make road as near as can be level, and no bank to ascend more than five inches in the yard. . . . He is to keep the road in good condition for one whole year. All to be done for £105 per measured mile."

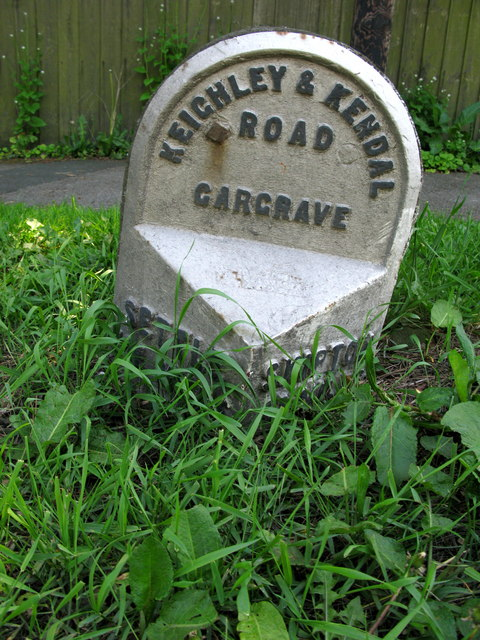
Gargrave Milepost

In 1754 they made a contract with John Birtwhistle of Skipton to build a road from Settle to Long Preston at 11s. 9d. per rod (£28 per mile) "to be stoned 16 inch thick" but it was reported in 1758 to be "too narrow, rarely exceeding five yards".

It was initially agreed that the standard width of the turnpike road would be 7 yards, of which 5 yards were to be metalled. In 1770 part of a highway in Settle was widened to ten yards. In 1778 near Ingleton part of the road is recorded as being 12 yards wide.

=== Bridges ===
The medieval bridges at Kildwick and Settle were widened to accommodate the turnpike traffic. Their undersides show the older portion with ribbed arches distinct from the new. Before widening, Settle Bridge was only 10 feet wide including the parapet.

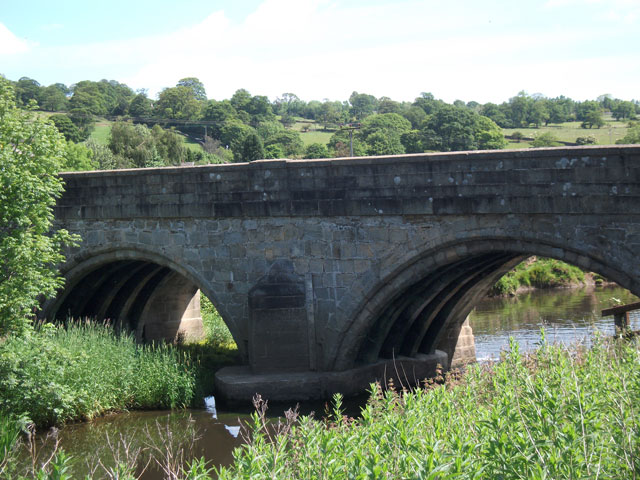
Kildwick Bridge west side built 1305-1313 showing medieval ribbed vaulting.

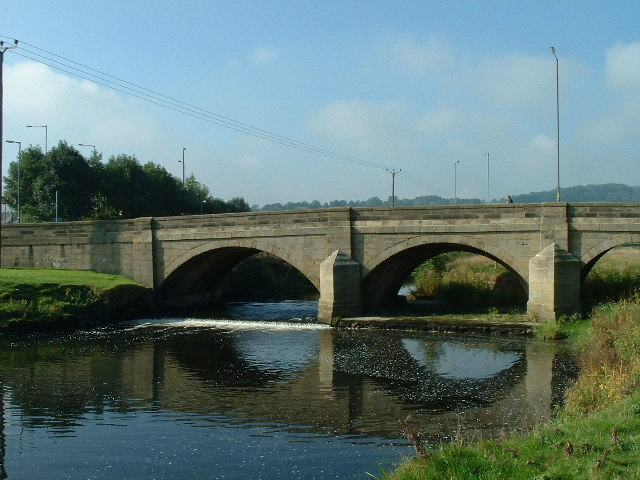
Kildwick Bridge east side built 1780 showing smooth vaulting.

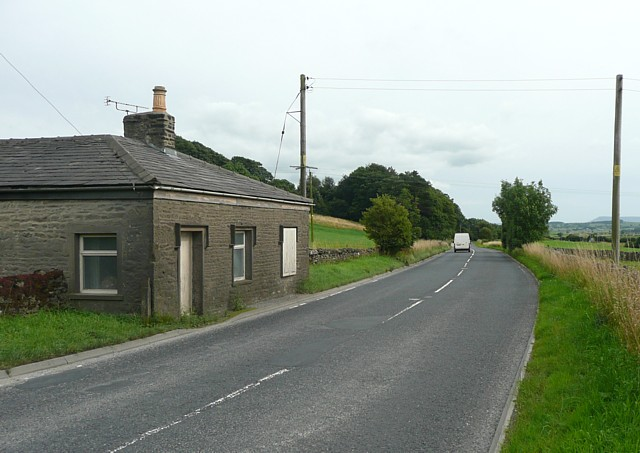
The B6480 and Turnpike House, Settle

== Toll bars ==
Initially there were five toll bars on the turnpike: Steeton Bank, Holme Bridge, Long Preston Bridge, Clapham and Kirkby Lonsdale. But by 1840 there were seven gates.

In 1758 a meeting at Skipton decided to erect a sixth toll gate at Settle Bridge. It proved unprofitable as it was easily avoided by using Kendalman’s Ford, or Helwith Bridge, or going via Stainforth, and was removed in 1778. Locals made a good living by guiding travellers round the bars so many gates were repositioned in 1823.

In 1833 at the five gates between Ingleton and Skipton the takings per year were:-

- Greet Bridge Gate (Ingleton) £324
- Clapham Gate £452
- Runley Bridge Gate (Long Preston) £486
- Hellifield Gate £474
- Holme Bridge Gate £349.

Attempts were frequently made to evade payment of tolls: in 1756 John Scot of Keighley unloaded his cart before passing through to reduce the toll; in 1757 William Smith broke open the bar at Steeton and in 1758 Mr. Jefferson rode through the fields to avoid payment. It was found the best location for securing tolls was at a river bridge. In many towns local residents made a profit out of guiding strangers across the old ford.

Some gate keepers were suspected of dishonesty as it was difficult to check their takings so by 1758 they were no longer employed by the trustees but each gate was let at a fixed rent. In later years they were let to one contractor e.g., Messrs. Bowers of Hunslet.

The rise of railway transport caused revenues to fall considerably halting improving schemes. The K&KR Trust was a commercial failure having incurred debts of nearly £34,000.

== Losses ==
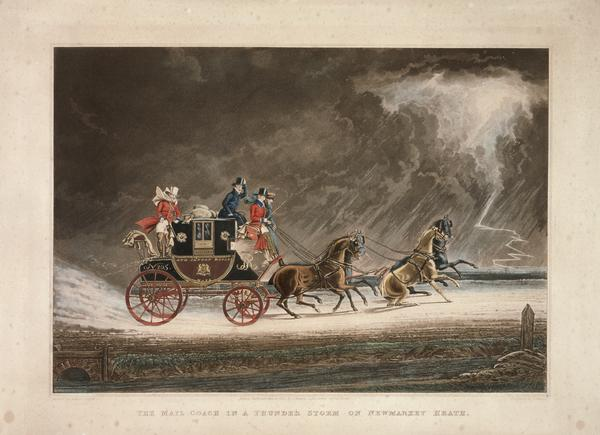
A Royal Mail coach in 1827

By 1827 most of the road was completed and the trust was in debt by £34,000. A key problem proved to be miscalculation of the cost of maintaining the road. In 1762 the trust allotted only £20 a year for 17 miles between Keighley and Skipton. Nobody foresaw the wear and tear caused by the increase of traffic. Royal Mail coaches paid no tolls yet

"these machines from their great weight and from the speed with which they are driven do amazing damage to the roads over which they pass, and will soon either occasion a bankruptcy in some districts or an increase in the rate of tolls”

In 1877 instructions were given "that the gates must be taken off their hinges at 12 o' clock of 1 November and put aside and sold as soon as possible". The investors received on average only 54% of the money they had advanced. Most of the capital had come from the northwest end of the road.

By the Highways and Locomotives (Amendment) Act 1878 (41 & 42 Vict. c. 77), Parliament abolished the principle of turnpikes and when the trusts fell due handed the roads to quarter sessions with power to levy rates on the whole county for their maintenance, supplementing them by a grant from the exchequer. The Local Government Act 1888 allowed the newly created county councils to manage the roads transferred to them.

== Gains ==
Before the turnpike about 90 pack horses continuously worked the route from Kendal through Yorkshire. Their panniers were wicker hampers to carry local manufactures and necessities. The cost of this form of transportation was almost prohibitive. Coal was seldom transported far from coastal harbours. When the turnpike opened pack-horses gave way to crude carts with revolving axles. Post-chaises were introduced to Kendal in 1754, and the first stage waggon in 1757. Staging meant maintaining speed by frequent changes of horses. Many inns became posting houses that kept horses to let for the next stage at 1s. to 1s. 6d. per mile, returning with the next party coming the reverse way. When room permitted, carrier waggons were used by people who could not afford to travel on horseback. The first passenger stagecoaches arrived in Westmorland in 1763. In 1786 the Mail Coach began to run regularly. In the early 1800s the Union coach ran from Kendal to Keighley each way on alternate days. By 1840 there were daily services from Kendal to Skipton and Kirkby Lonsdale. Wealthier travellers hired postchaises or had their own vehicles.

== Changes in the towns ==
=== Keighley ===
Keighley's industries were dependent on the effective transportation for incoming coal, supplies and materials and outgoing textiles and textile machinery. In 1782 the route out of Keighley by Spring Gardens Lane – Hollins Lane – Hollins Bank Lane was superseded by a new road: Bar House Lane – Keighley Road, the B6265. In 1786 North Street was created and from its south end the Union coach departed from The Devonshire Arms on Church Street.

Keighley became an intersection with other turnpikes including the Two Laws Toller and Haworth and Blue Bell Trust Turnpike (1755) from Bradford to Colne; the Bradford to Keighley turnpike (1814); and the Keighley—Halifax turnpike.

=== Steeton ===
Settle made a provision that no gate could be set up nearer to Keighley than Steeton. In 1752–53 the turnpike road followed Hollins Bank Road. The Pack Horse Inn was nearby. In 1753 a new bridge was built over Steeton Beck. The first toll gate was set up in 1753 at "Steeton Cross" at the foot of the hill. In 1782 when the new road under Hawkcliffe was made, the toll-bar was removed to "Old Bar-house" to intercept traffic by Old Bar-house Lane and the new road. The Star Inn was on High Street but its licence and name were moved to a new inn at the road junction on the turnpike road. "The Goat’s Head" on the original route of the turnpike on Upper School Street in the 1770s was moved to its present site opposite the Station Road junction.

In the early 19th century the toll road was diverted under Hawcliffe along the line of the present A629 through the north side of the village.

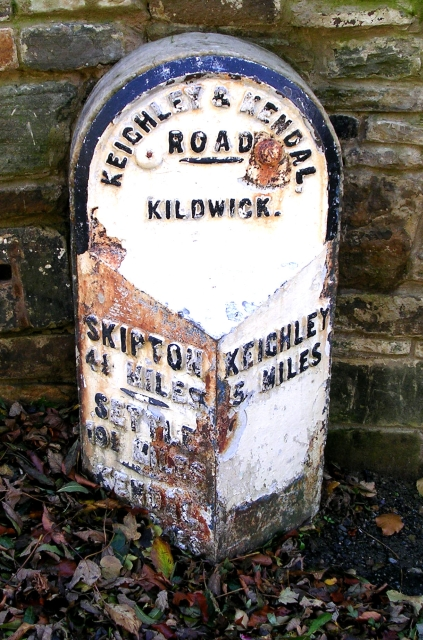
Milestone - Skipton Road, Kildwick

=== Kildwick ===
The bridge was widened at Kildwick. Coaches passing through in 1822 were:

- the Royal Mail,
- a gig from Bradford arrived at 10 am and departed to Skipton immediately. It returned at 12 noon to proceed to Bradford.
- the Royal Alexander, a coach to Leeds, departed Kildwick at 6 am daily and returned at 9 pm, Sundays excepted.
- the Royal Union, a coach to Skipton, departed Kildwick at 3.15 pm daily, excluding Sundays and returned at 1.30 pm to proceed to Leeds.

The Kildwick to Snaygill section was constructed between 1763 and 1786 but sadly those minutes are lost. Between Farnhill and Snaygill the turnpike ran as close at 20 metres to the Leeds and Liverpool Canal.

=== Skipton ===
Skipton became a dynamic crossroads for three Turnpikes: the Keighley-Kendal Turnpike, the Skipton-Addingham Turnpike and the Skipton-Colne Turnpike.
Today, the Skipton-Kendal route is designated the A65, the Skipton-Addingham route is also designated the A65, and the Skipton-Colne route is designated the A6068.

=== Settle ===
Daniel Defoe wrote "Settle is the capital of an isolated little kingdom of its own surrounded by barren hills." The town obtained a market charter in 1249 but because of its isolation continued to see mostly local commerce. Converting the rough road into a turnpike changed its character ending its isolation and connecting it with growing industrial towns. The minute book for the trust shows that most of the interest in the turnpike came from Settle and records show many of its financiers were from hereabouts.

The course of the turnpike was decided before the end of 1753 and the contract for its construction was given in 1754. Radical changes meant that of the 8 1/2 miles through Settle only 250 yards of the old road were used.

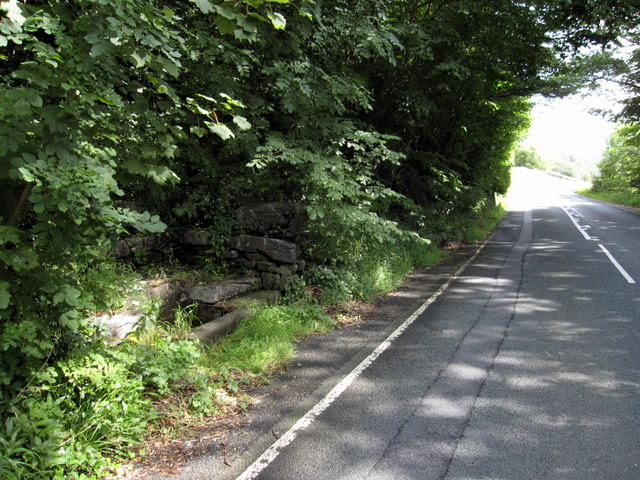
The Ebbing and Flowing Well was a popular stopping place near Settle but its action now rarely occurs.

The road to Clapham, which made a wide detour through Giggleswick and Lawkland, was straightened. The new road was constructed beneath Giggleswick Scarr and over Brunton.

The ancient route from Long Preston ran up a hill to 1,025 feet then descended precipitously through Upper Settle. This was because the Ribble Valley was swampy before field drainage. The new route from Long Preston came up from the valley through Duck Street, renamed Duke Street. The Golden Lion Inn that once faced the Market Square was realigned in 1754 onto Duke Street to cater for coach traffic. The advent of wheeled vehicles began a golden age for the inns.

The turnpike benefited the textile industry by forming connections with large industrial towns. Clayton and Walshman established the first cotton mill in Yorkshire at Low Mill in Keighley, then built the Langcliffe Cotton Mill in Settle and imported skilled workers from Keighley. Heavy industry, quarries that exported agricultural lime and dressed sandstone for masonry and factories that imported coal welcomed the turnpike for access to the Leeds and Liverpool Canal at Gargrave.

=== Kirkby Lonsdale ===
At Kirkby Lonsdale the route met a turnpike from Milnthorpe on the coast, and in 1818 the Keighley to Kendal Trust and the Kirkby Lonsdale to Milnthorpe Trust were amalgamated. Beyond Kirkby Lonsdale the turnpike did not prefigure the A65; rather its route is the B6254, passing Mansergh/Old Town, Old Hutton and Oxenholme to reach Kendal.

=== Kendal ===
Early travellers to Kendal complained of eight miles of "nothing but a confused mixture of Rockes and Boggs" Horseback was the fastest form of travel as the road was "no better than the roughest fell tracks on high ground and spongy, miry tracks in the vallies." It became evident that it was unjust and beyond the power of the thinly scattered rural population thereabouts be called upon to maintain a road used for through traffic.

"Whereas the road is very ruinous, and some parts thereof almost impassable and could not, by the ordinary course appointed by the Laws then in being for repairing the highways, be amended and kept in good repair, unless some further provision was made."

In 1703 by order of the quarter sessions of the Barony of Kendall the surveyors of highways was to make the roads good and sufficient for the passage of coaches, carts and carriages

By 1823 twelve stage coaches left Kendal daily on the various turnpikes.
