= Kildwick =

Village and civil parish in North Yorkshire, England

Coordinates: 53°54′31″N 1°59′01″W

- Location within North Yorkshire
- Population: 194 (2011 Census)
- OS grid reference: SE008461
- Civil parish: Kildwick
- Unitary authority: North Yorkshire
- Ceremonial county: North Yorkshire
- Region: Yorkshire and the Humber
- Country: England
- Sovereign state: United Kingdom
- Post town: KEIGHLEY
- Postcode district: BD20
- Dialling code: 01535
- Police: North Yorkshire
- Fire: North Yorkshire
- Ambulance: Yorkshire
- UK Parliament: Skipton and Ripon

Kildwick, or Kildwick-in-Craven, is a village and civil parish in the county of North Yorkshire, England. It is situated between Skipton and Keighley and had a population of 191 in 2001, rising slightly to 194 at the 2011 census. Kildwick is a landmark as where the major road from Keighley to Skipton crosses the River Aire. The village's amenities include a primary school, church and public house.

Until 1974 it was part of the West Riding of Yorkshire. From 1974 to 2023 it was part of the Craven District, it is now administered by the unitary North Yorkshire Council.

== History ==
=== Etymology ===
- Wick: In the Proto-Germanic language used within the Danelaw the meaning of wīc or vik was trading place, for example Jórvík (York), Berwick, and Keswick, Cumbria.

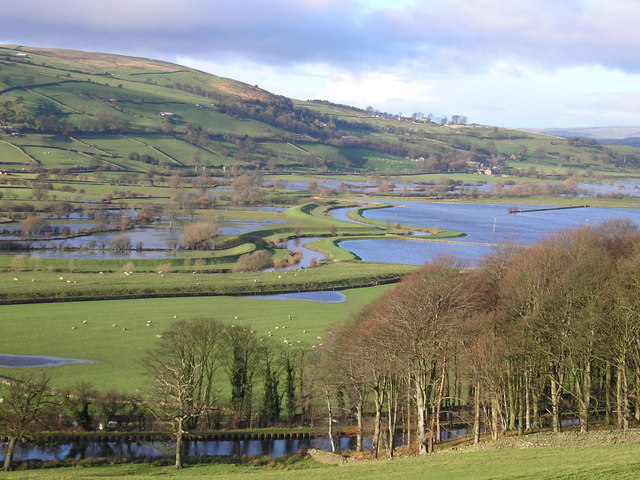
Etymology: "kilde", in Old Norse, means a smooth body of water.

- Kild: Kelda has its roots in the Proto-Germanic language kiltham, a vessel of any size. In Old Danish kilde means a large smooth body of water like a floodplain, however, Mr. Moorman, the authority on Yorkshire Place names, decided Kildwick means the Village by the Well,. In another village, the Keld is as small as a spring.
- The first documentation of Kildwick's name appears in the Domesday Book as Childeuuic because the scribes wrote in Latin that did not use the letter k before i, rather the digraph ch, pronounced /kʰ/ not /tʃ/ hence the village's pronunciation has always been always Kildwick. Without this information Childeuuic has been misunderstood as child's dairy farm, from kilþei womb in Gothic; however, that meaning was used only in Old English in the south of England Therefore, its pronunciation in both Latin and Old Norse was the same as it is now.

=== Property ===
The Domesday Book of 1086 has the first record of Kildwick in writing. It lists the Lord of the Childeuuic manor as Arnkeld with about 240 acres (100 hectares) of ploughland and an Anglo-Saxon church.

However, William the Conqueror shortly deposed all the Angle-Dane lords and rewarded his great Norman warriors. Ruling over-all in Craven was Robert de Romille. In 1120 Robert's heir Cecilia de Romille, Lady of Skipton, founded an Augustine priory at Embsay near Skipton and endowed it with the manor/estate of Kildwick. In 1153 the proprietors of Kildwick moved their priory to Bolton Abbey.

From 1305 to 1313, Bolton Priory paid for the bridge over the River Aire to be built in stone. They also built Kildwick Grange as a local residence.

In 1539, Henry VIII dissolved the monastery at Bolton and granted Kildwick manor to Robert Wilkinson and Thomas Drake of Halifax but granted the church to Christ Church, Oxford.

In 1549, Thomas Drake alienated the Manor to John Garforth of Farnhill. In 1558, the Garforths sold it all to the Currer family with whose lineal descendants it remains.

=== Population ===
- 1379 Poll Tax recorded Kildwick township as having only 10 households, all paying the minimum tax.
- 1672 Hearth Tax counted 25 households in the township with mostly but one fireplace, but also the 14-hearthed manor house.
- 1821 parish registered 8,605 inhabitants.
- 1831 parish was 9,926 however township only 190.
- 1881 the parish had been divided so district down to 8,923.
- 1891 district up to 9,859 but township down to 145.

=== St Andrew's Church ===
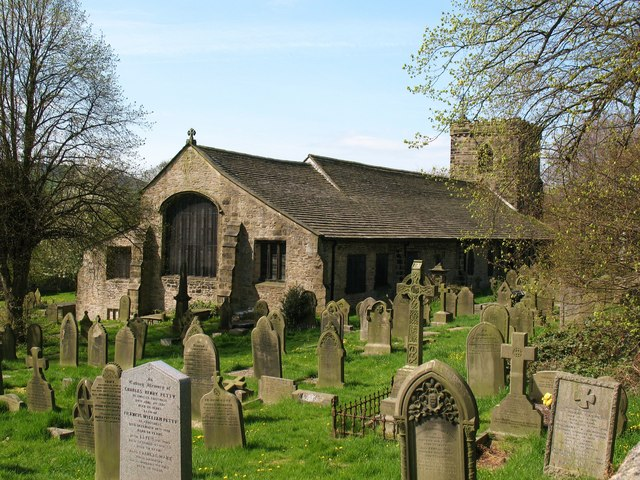
St Andrew's, Kildwick Parish Church

St Andrew's is a historically significant church. Fragments of 10th-century crosses have been excavated from its walls, evidence of the Anglo-Saxon church built here before the Norman Conquest. It was replaced by one of stone in the 12th century. Cecilia de Romille gave the church to Bolton Priory in Wharfedale, the Manor of Kildwick coming under the jurisdiction of the Priors of Bolton.

After the Battle of Bannockburn in 1314 Scots raiders sacked Bingley and Bradford Churches, but spared Keighley and Kildwick Churches because they were dedicated to St. Andrew, patron saint of Scotland. However, in 1318 the church building was badly damaged by Scottish raiders.

In 1539 Henry VIII dissolved the monastery and granted the church to Christ Church, Oxford. In the reign of Henry VIII under the patronage of Christ Church the church was almost entirely rebuilt. During the 15th and 16th centuries the church was lengthened, with further extensions eastwards so that it is now one of the longest in Yorkshire hence known locally as 'The Lang Kirk of Craven'.

The church was restored in 1873 by the Lancaster partnership of Paley and Austin. Changes have taken place since then, including extension of the chancel and a further restoration of the nave in 1901–03 by the successors in the Lancaster practice, Austin and Paley.

Charlotte Brontë and other members of the Brontë family were acquainted with the church.

=== Kildwick Parish ===
Ancient Kildwick Parish was unusually large for it included the townships of Kildwick, Bradley Both, Cononley, Cowling, Holden, Eastburn, Farnhill, Glusburn, Ikornshaw, Silsden, Steeton, Sutton and Stirton and Thorlby.

Arable land in the old parish of Kildwick that was taxed in the Domesday Book c1086
Location	curactes (120 acres/50ha)	other property	Taxpayer
Kildwick	2	1 church	Archil
Eastburn	3	2 oxgangs	Gamalbern
Cononley	2		Torchil
Bradley	7		Archil, Torchil, Gamel
Farnhill	2		Gamel
Sutton	2		Ravenchil
Steeton	3		was Gamalbern now Gilbert Tison
Glusburn	3		was Gamalbern now Gilbert Tison
Glusburn	3		was Gamalbern now William de Percy
Silsden	8		five Thanes of Osbern de Arches

In the mid 19th century the advent of textile factories caused rapid growth of some of the townships. It became anomalous for residents of those expanding towns to have to travel to a tiny village to be baptised, married and buried. In consequence the parish was divided, for example the other side of the River Aire Sutton-in-Craven was constituted as a separate ecclesiastical district in 1869 and built its own parish church. However adjacent Cross Hills is still in the parish of Kildwick.

=== Education ===
Education in Kildwick has a substantial history. In 1563 and 1564 the Archbishop of York's Visitation Act books records a schoolmaster at Kildwick. And the national Hearth tax of 1672 records “George Ellmott for the Freeschoole, 2 hearths” untaxed in Kildwick. In 2012 the School is adjacent to the parish church on Priest Bank Road and is known as Kildwick Church of England Voluntary Controlled Primary School. It caters for girls and boys age range 4 to 11; maximum number of pupils per grade 17.

== Transport ==
=== Road ===
Kildwick is a landmark in Craven being the point at which the main road from Keighley to Skipton crosses the River Aire. Kildwick is made a natural crossing place by the spur of land from Crosshills that dramatically narrows a wide valley prone to flooding. This spur is a first river terrace deposit of silt and sand with gravel lenses. It was later enlarged downstream by about 60 acres (25ha) of made ground.

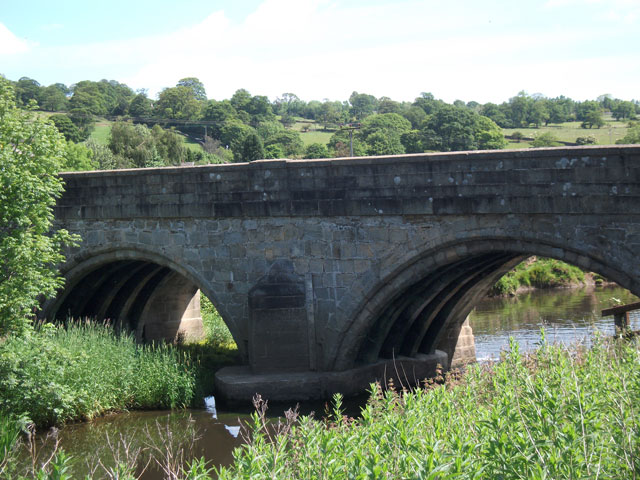
Kildwick Bridge west side built 1305–13 with ribbed vaulting

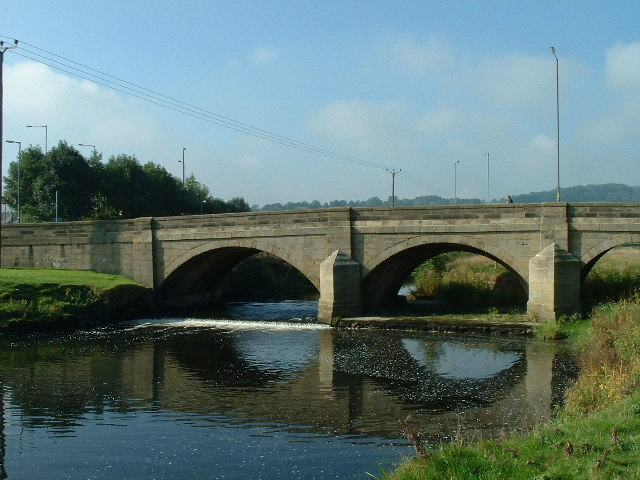
Kildwick Bridge east side built 1780

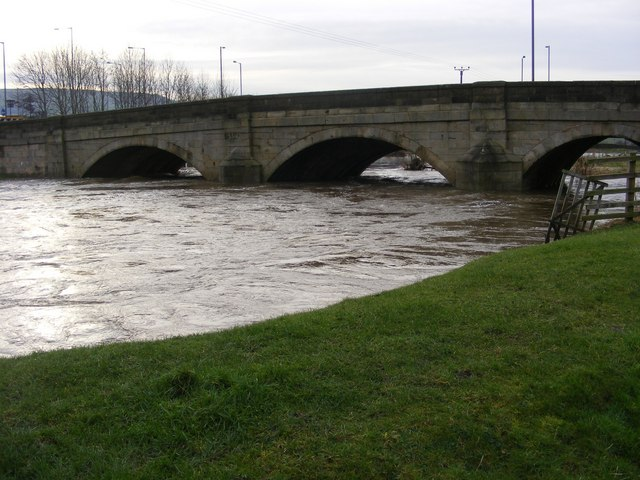
Below the bridge after days of heavy rain

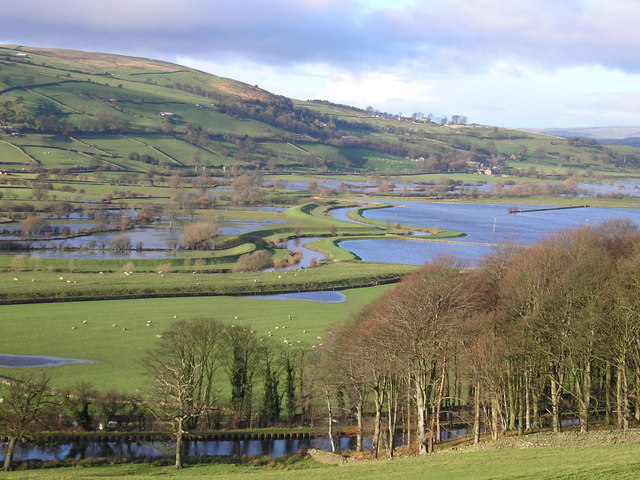
The River Aire flooding above the bridge

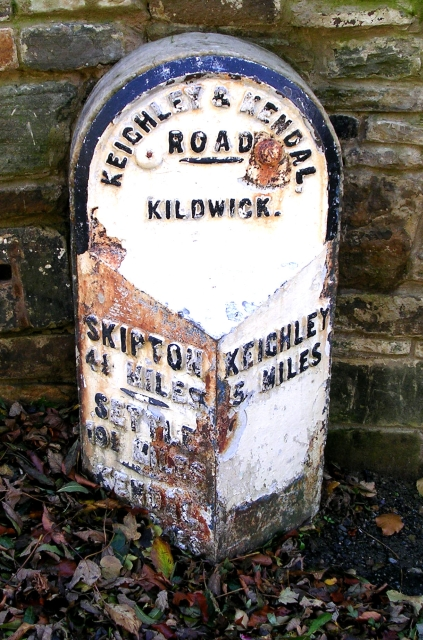
The milestone on the Keighley and Kendal Turnpike

From 1305 to 1313 Bolton Abbey paid for "Aire-brigg" to be built in stone however wooden bridges had existed there many centuries before that. The bridge at Kildwick is the first stone bridge recorded in Craven and the oldest bridge in Airedale and has been designated a Grade I building.

The Keighley and Kendal Turnpike Trust operated from 1752 to 1878. It was promoted mostly by textile manufacturers of Settle on the grounds that transportation costs would be greatly reduced by using wagons on good roads instead of packhorses. need half the number of horses required for carrying packs. It was built to a standard width of 7 yards of which 5 were metalled.

In 1780 the bridge was widened for the Turnpike and is structurally two bridges standing side‐by‐side. The upstream side with ribbed vaulting and two pointed arches is the 14th-century original. The downstream side has only plain round arches.

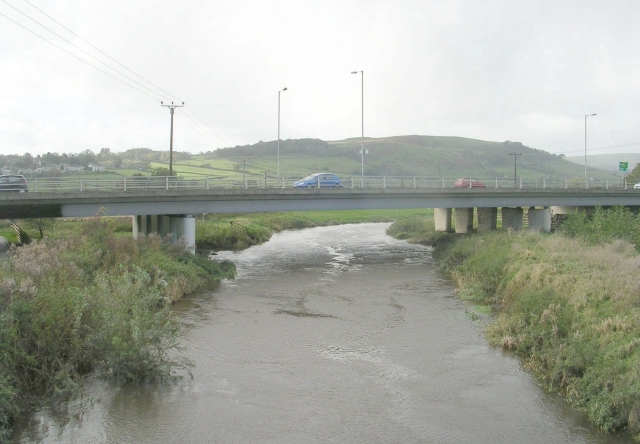
The new A629 built 1968–1988 bypasses Kildwick village

In 1823 the Blackburn Addingham road opened. Six stagecoaches a day passed through the area. However the Keighley and Kendal Turnpike proved to be a commercial failure and ceased, in debt, in 1878. The roads passed into the care of the County Council.

By 1968 the traffic volume found the bridge and village to be such a bottleneck that it necessitated a bypass re built, the A629, completed in 1988.

=== Canal ===
Kildwick village is so close to the canal that they touch. In 1773 the Bingley to Skipton section was the first section of the Leeds and Liverpool Canal to be completed. By 1781 the canal joined Leeds to Gargrave, and in 1816 completed the link to Liverpool. It was of benefit for transport of supplies and goods from the textile mills that stood on the other side of the river.

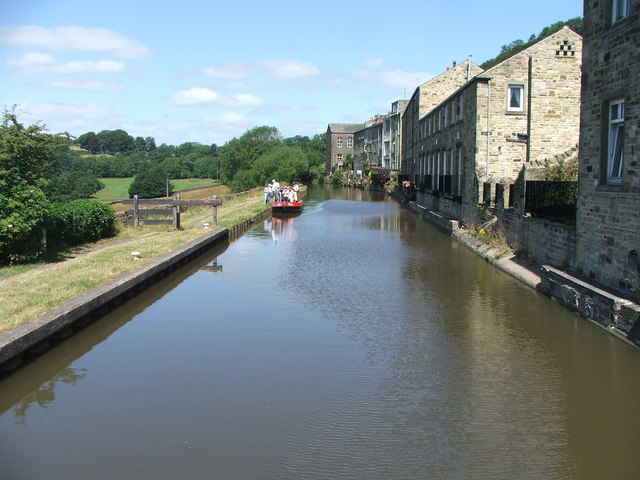
The Leeds and Liverpool Canal at Kildwick

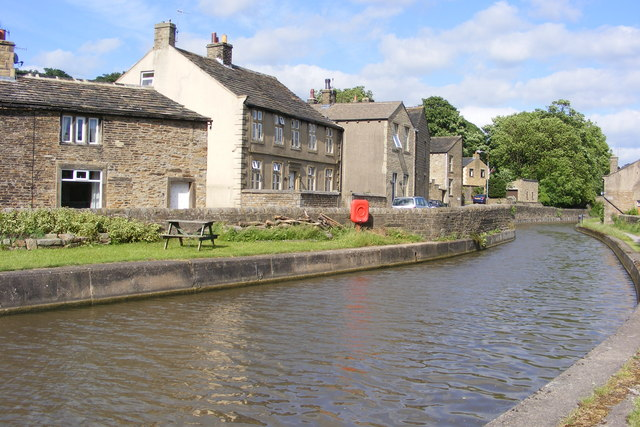
Houses by the canal

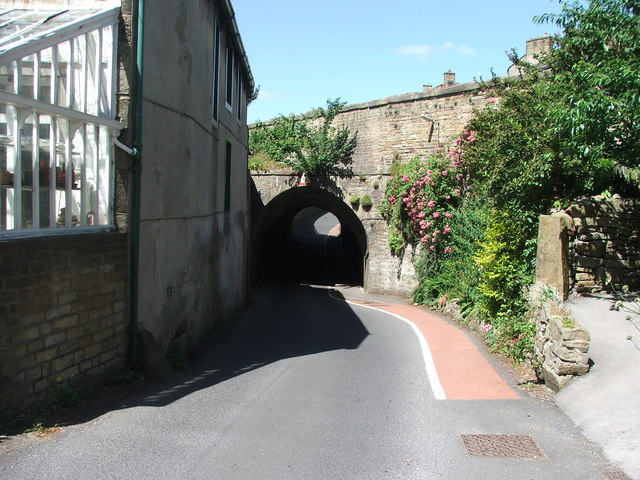
Road going beneath the canal

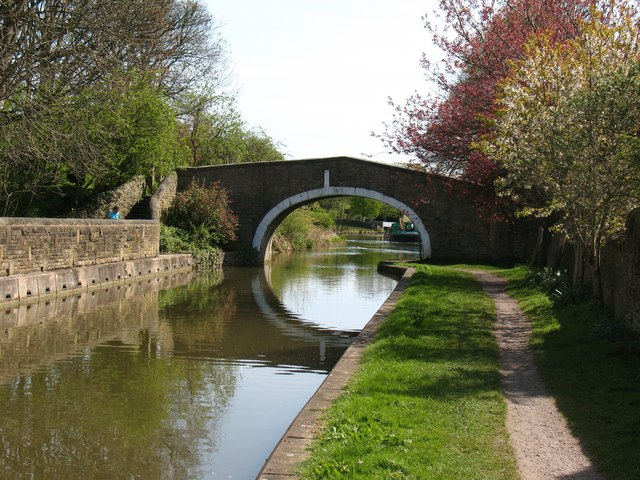
Canal footbridge to Farnhill

=== Rail ===
In 1847 the Leeds and Bradford Extension Railway opened its Shipley to Skipton section through Kildwick and Crosshills railway station. Kildwick was thus served by rail until the station was closed in 1965. Steeton is the nearest railway station.

== Main sights ==
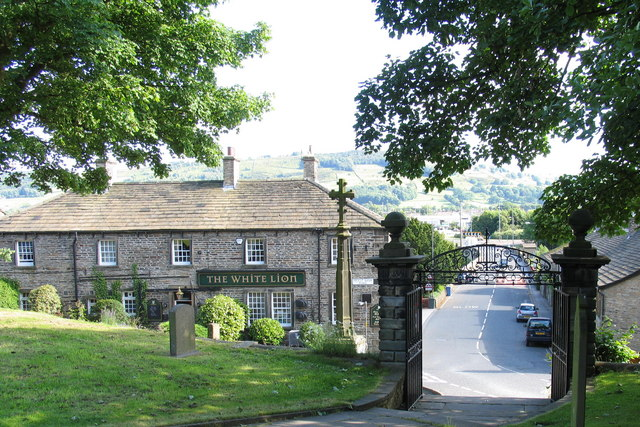
The war memorial and the White Lion pub

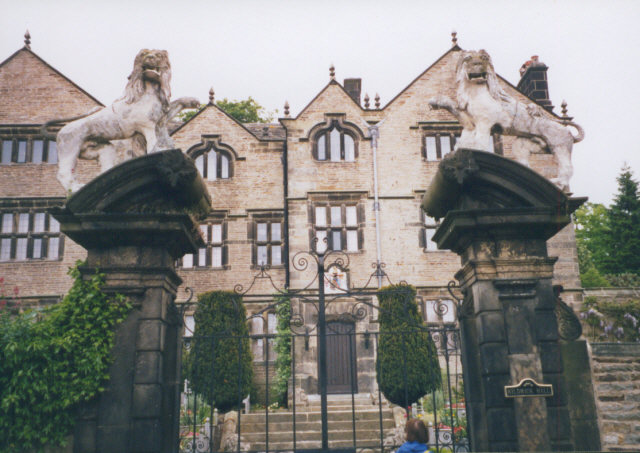
Kildwick Hall

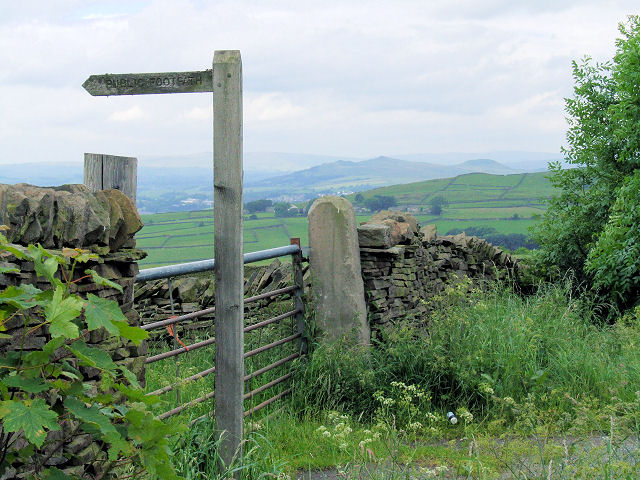
The start of the Kildwick Moor footpaths

== Notable people ==
- Stephen Barrett (1718–1801), teacher of classics, was born at Bent, in the parish of Kildwick.
- Katie Griffiths (born 1989), actress, grew up in Kildwick.
- Henry Mosley (1852–1933), first-class cricketer, was born in Kildwick.
- Clare Teal (1973–), English jazz singer, was born in Kildwick.
- John Webster (alias Johannes Hyphastes) (1610–1682), clergyman and physician, became curate at Kildwick in 1634.

== See also ==
- Listed buildings in Kildwick
