= Stephen Barrett (classics teacher) =

British classics teacher (1718–1801)

- Born: 1718
- Died: 1801 (aged 82–83)

Stephen Barrett (1718–1801) was a British classics teacher, who published some translations of Latin texts.

== Life ==
Barrett was born in 1718 at Bent, in the parish of Kildwick in Craven, Yorkshire. He was educated at the grammar school, Skipton, and at University College, Oxford, and graduated with an MA in 1744.

Barrett entered the ministry, he became master of the free grammar school at Ashford, Kent, and was made rector of the parishes of Purton and Ickleford, Hertfordshire. In 1773, he resigned his mastership on receiving the living of Hothfield, Kent.

He continued to hold the living until his death, which occurred at Northiam, Sussex, on 26 November 1801.

== Works ==
In 1746 Barrett published a Latin translation, which was admired at the time, of Pope's Pastorals.

Among his friends in early life were Samuel Johnson, and the founder of The Gentleman's Magazine, Edward Cave. To that magazine Barrett was a frequent contributor. Vol. xxiv. contains a letter, signed with his name, on a new method of modelling the tenses of Latin verbs.

In 1759, he published Ovid's Epistles translated into English verse, with critical essays and notes; being part of a poetical and oratorical lecture read to the grammar school of Ashford in the county of Kent, and calculated to initiate youth in the first principles of Taste.

He was also the author of War, an Epic Satire, and other trifles.

== Family ==
He married Mary, daughter of Edward Jacob of Canterbury. They had a daughter who survived him.
