= Listed buildings in Kildwick =

Kildwick is a civil parish in the county of North Yorkshire, England. It contains 27 listed buildings that are recorded in the National Heritage List for England. Of these, two are listed at Grade I, the highest of the three grades, one is at Grade II*, the middle grade, and the others are at Grade II, the lowest grade. The parish contains the village of Kildwick and the surrounding countryside. The Leeds and Liverpool Canal passes through the village, and the listed buildings associated with it are a bridge and an aqueduct, The other listed buildings include a church, tombs and a hearse house in the churchyard, and its two gateways, a large house, Kildwick Hall, and associated structures, smaller houses, two further bridges, a set of stocks, a sundial shaft, and a milepost.

== Key ==
Grade	Criteria
I	Buildings of exceptional interest, sometimes considered to be internationally important
II*	Particularly important buildings of more than special interest
II	Buildings of national importance and special interest

== Buildings ==
Name and location	Photograph	Date	Notes	Grade
Kildwick Bridge; 53.90741°N 1.98450°W		1305–13	The bridge carries Main Road over the River Aire. It is in stone, and consists of four arches, the northern two with pointed arches and the southern two with round arches. It has pointed cutwaters, shallow buttresses, chamfered voussoirs, chamfered ribs, a projecting band, and parapets with ridged coping.	I
St Andrew's Church; 53.90919°N 1.98401°W		14th century	The church has been altered and extended through the centuries, including a restoration in 1901–03 by Austin and Paley. It is built in sandstone and gritstone with a roof of stone slate, and consists of a nave with a clerestory, north and south aisles, a south porch, a chancel and a west tower. The tower has two stages, angle buttresses, a southwest stair turret, and a west doorway with a chamfered arch, above which is a three-light window and a niche. On the south front is a cast iron clock face, the bell openings have two lights, and above is a corbelled embattled parapet, and an ornate wrought iron weathervane. On the chancel is an inscribed and dated sundial.	I
Grange Hall and Cottage; 53.91230°N 1.97015°W	—	1614–20	A house, later extended and subsequently divided, in gritstone, with quoins, and a stone slate roof. There are two storeys and an attic, a range of three bays, a large two-bay west wing, a one-bay east wing, and a central rear stair turret. On the south front is a porch with a chamfered opening, a moulded cornice and balustrade, and a moulded parapet on moulded balusters. There is a doorway with a Tudor arched lintel, and the windows are chamfered and mullioned.	II
Kildwick Hall and kitchen block 53.91281°N 1.98357°W		1605s	A large house is gritstone, with quoins, and a stone slate roof with gable copings, moulded kneelers and pyramidal finials. There are three storeys and four gabled bays, the outer bays and the third bay, with a two-storey porch, slightly projecting. The porch contains a doorway with a moulded surround, and a triangular head, above which is a hood mould, and a moulded plaque with a coat of arms in relief. The windows in the lower two floors are mullioned and transomed, those in the upper floor are mullioned, two of them with ogee heads, and all have hood moulds. At the rear is a three-bay kitchen range from 1673 linked to the house.	II*
Gate piers, Kildwick Grange Hall; 53.91216°N 1.97015°W	—	17th century	The gate piers are in gritstone, and about 2 metres (6 ft 7 in) high. Each gate pier has a chamfered shaft, on which are two chamfered blocks, and a ball and cushion finial.	II
Pavilion southeast of Kildwick Hall; 53.91265°N 1.98262°W	—	17th century	The pavilion, later a dovecote, is in gritstone, with quoins, and a stone slate roof with a coped gable and pyramidal finials on each side. The entrance on the west side has tie-stone jambs, at the rear is a blocked narrow window with a chamfered cusped head, and on the sides are blocked mullioned windows with hood moulds. In the centre of the roof is a crocketed finial.	II
Stocks; 53.90882°N 1.98443°W	—	17th century (possible)	The stocks adjacent to the south entrance to St Andrew's Church are in gritstone. They consist of two pillars about 1 metre (3 ft 3 in) high, square and slightly tapering. They have a stone floor board with =four recesses, and a groove on the inner face.	II
The Old Priory; 53.91198°N 1.97907°W		Mid 17th century	Two cottages combined into one house, in gritstone, with quoins, and stone slate roofs with gable copings and bulbous kneelers. The main house and the cottage, recessed on the right, each has two storeys and three bays. In the centre of the main house is a gabled porch containing a doorway with chamfered quoins converted into a window. Above it is a gable containing a stepped three-light mullioned window, the lights with curved head, and above is a ogee-curved hood mould. Most of the other windows in both parts are mullioned, some with hood moulds.	II
Kildwick Grange Farmhouse; 53.91222°N 1.97093°W	—	Mid to late 17th century	The farmhouse is in gritstone with quoins and a stone slate roof. There are two storeys and two bays, and an added bay to the left. The doorway has a chamfered quoined surround, and the windows are chamfered, recessed and mullioned. In the added bay is a doorway with a quoined surround.	II
Lane House and barn 53.91202°N 1.96504°W	—	Mid to late 17th century	The house and attached barn are in gritstone with stone slate roofs, and form a long range with the barn on the left. The house has gable coping and moulded kneelers. There are two storeys and three bays, and a recessed bay on the left. The doorway has chamfered quoined jambs and initials above the lintel, and most of the windows are mullioned. The barn has four bays and a projecting bay on the left, forming an L-shaped plan. It contains quoins, doorways, vents and a rectangular owl hole.	II
Sundial shaft 53.90880°N 1.98439°W	—	1668	The sundial shaft in the Garden of Remembrance is in gritstone and about 1 metre (3 ft 3 in) high. The base and top are square, and the shaft between is carved with deep chamfers and bulbous stops. On the top of the south face is a rectangular recessed panel with the date in raised lettering.	II
The Old Barn and The Cottage; 53.91273°N 1.98412°W	—	1671	A barn and coach house, later two houses, in gritstone on a chamfered plinth, with quoins, and a stone slate roof gable coping, kneelers and pyramidal finials. There are two storeys, the barn has five bays, and the coach house has two. The barn has a central cart entrance with chamfered quoined jambs and voussoirs, and doorways, one with an initialled and dated lintel. The former coach house has a doorway with a quoined surround, in the right return is a carriage arch with chamfered voussoirs, and a mullioned window above.	II
Great Slack; 53.91998°N 1.97140°W	—	1697	The house is in gritstone, with quoins, and a stone slate roof with coping and bulbous kneelers. There are two storeys and four bays. On the front is a two-storey porch containing a doorway with a chamfered surround, and a massive lintel incised to resemble voussoirs, and above it is a triangle of stones with an inscribed date. Throughout there are recessed chamfered mullioned windows.	II
The Justice Room; 53.91267°N 1.98374°W		c. 1700	A coach house with rooms above, later used for other purposes, it is in gritstone, with angle pilasters and rusticated quoins above, floor bands, a moulded eaves cornice, and a stone slate roof. There are two storeys and fronts of three and two bays. In the centre of the west front is a basket-arched carriage entrance with moulded quoined jambs and voussoirs, flanked by doors in architraves with fanlights, and in the upper floor are cross windows with moulded architraves. The south front, facing the road, has a moulded triangular pediment, cross windows in the ground floor and sashes above.	II
Wall, gate piers and urns, Kildwick Hall; 53.91264°N 1.98353°W		Early 18th century	The front garden wall is in gritstone with ridge coping and moulding, and on the wall are two pairs of urns with ball finials. The gate piers are rusticated, and each has a frontal pilaster, an entablature and a cornice, above which is a half-pediment, and on each pediment is a heraldic lion passant in limestone.	II
Two urns, Kildwick Hall; 53.91273°N 1.98374°W	—	Mid to late 18th century	The two urns in the courtyard of the house are in gritstone. Each has a splayed base, a swagged bowl, and a gadrooned cover with a ball finial.	II
Garden and terrace walls, gate piers and steps 53.91238°N 1.98173°W	—	Mid to late 18th century	The walls enclose a rectangular garden with a terrace, and are in gritstone with an inner face of brick and stone quoins. In the centre of the north wall are the remains of gate piers to a height of about 80 centimetres (31 in), and in the south wall are piers about 2 metres (6 ft 7 in) high, with shallow pyramidal caps. The terrace has a ha-ha wall, and there are three short flights of steps.	II
Aqueduct; 53.90956°N 1.98602°W		c. 1774	The aqueduct carries the Leeds and Liverpool Canal over a road. It is in stone, and consists of a single span forming a tunnel 50 metres (160 ft) long. The aqueduct has solid parapets, and the soffit is canted upwards at each end.	II
Parsons Bridge; 53.90961°N 1.98447°W		c. 1774	A footbridge over the Leeds and Liverpool Canal and its towpath, it is in gritstone and consists of a single coped basket arch. The flanking walls are angled, and end in pilasters.	II
Buddhist shrine (1), Kildwick Hall; 53.91276°N 1.98302°W	—	Late 18th to early 19th century (probable)	The shrine in the garden of the house is in grey sandstone, and is about 1.2 metres (3 ft 11 in) high. It has an octagonal base and shaft, surmounted by a shrine with panels decorated with naturalistic carvings in relief. There is a petal-like cover and a bulbous finial.	II
Buddhist shrine (2), Kildwick Hall; 53.91276°N 1.98293°W	—	Late 18th to early 19th century (probable)	The shrine in the garden of the house is in grey sandstone, and is about 1.2 metres (3 ft 11 in) high. It has an octagonal base and a banded cylindrical shaft, surmounted by a shrine with panels decorated with animal motifs in relief. There is a cover of curled-back petal motifs, and a bulbous finial.	II
Buddhist shrine (3), Kildwick Hall; 53.91276°N 1.98287°W	—	Late 18th to early 19th century (probable)	The shrine in the garden of the house is in grey granite-like stone. It has a tapering cylindrical shaft on four legs, and is surmounted by a square shrine on an inverted truncated pyramid. The roof has a flattened moulded profile.	II
Buddhist shrine (4), Kildwick Hall; 53.91276°N 1.98279°W	—	Late 18th to early 19th century (probable)	The shrine in the garden of the house is in grey sandstone, and is about 1.2 metres (3 ft 11 in) high. It has an octagonal base and a banded cylindrical shaft, surmounted by a shrine with panels decorated with animal motifs in relief. There is a cover of curled-back petal motifs, and a bulbous finial.	II
Hearse house, St Andrew's Church; 53.90890°N 1.98336°W		c. 1825	The hearse house is in the churchyard to the southeast of the church. It is in gritstone with a stone slate roof, and has coping and shaped kneelers to the west gable. There is one storey and one bay. The entrance is in the gable, and it has a round arch with long and short jamb stones, and voussoirs.	II
South gates, overthrow, piers and steps, St Andrew's Church; 53.90885°N 1.98453°W		Early to mid 19th century	The gate piers flanking the west entrance to the churchyard are in stone, and about 3 metres (9.8 ft) high. Each pier has a chamfered base, a rusticated pier, a fluted entablature, a deep cornice, and a ball finial on a stepped base. The gates and overthrow are in wrought iron, and are decorated with scrolls. There are two flights of steps in gritstone, segmental in plan.	II
West gates, overthrow and piers, St Andrew's Church; 53.90930°N 1.98488°W	—	Early to mid 19th century	The gate piers flanking the west entrance to the churchyard are in stone, and about 3 metres (9.8 ft) high. Each pier has a chamfered base, a rusticated pier, a fluted entablature, a deep cornice, and a rusticated ball finial on a stepped base. The gates and overthrow are in wrought iron, the gates with spearhead finials, and the overthrow with acanthus-like motifs and spearhead finials.	II
Milepost; 53.90876°N 1.98482°W		Late 19th century	The milepost on the south side of Skipton Road is in cast iron on gritstone, and has a triangular section and a rounded top. On the top is inscribed "KEIGHLEY AND KENDAL ROAD" and "KILDWICK", on the left face are the distances to Skipton. Settle and Kendal and on the right face to Keighley.	II
