= Henry Mosley (cricketer) =

English cricketer

- Born: 8 March 1852; Kildwick near Skipton, Yorkshire, England
- Died: 29 November 1933 (aged 81)
- Occupation: First-class cricketer

Henry Mosley (8 March 1852 – 29 November 1933) was an English first-class cricketer, who played two matches for Yorkshire County Cricket Club in 1881, and another for Tom Emmett's XI v Alfred Shaw's XI at Bradford in the same year.

He was born in Kildwick, near Skipton, Yorkshire. He made his Yorkshire debut against Kent, at Mote Park in Maidstone. Mosley took 3 for 12, as Kent were bowled out in their first innings for 112. Edmund Peate and Billy Bates bowled unchanged in Kent's second innings to deliver a commanding victory to Yorkshire. Mosley bagged a pair in the game. He also played in the Roses Match at Old Trafford, scoring his only first-class run, but did not take a wicket in the eleven economical overs he bowled. Lancashire won the game by eight wickets. A left arm fast bowler, Mosley took four wickets for 65 in all matches. A right-handed tail end batsman, he scored just that one run in five innings, one of them unbeaten, to record a first-class average of 0.25.

He was a professional cricketer in the Bradford Cricket League who at various times was engaged at Farsley C.C., Great Horton C.C. in Bradford and, for many years, at Saltaire C.C. He also worked as a farm servant and tailor.

Mosley died at St. Luke's Hospital in Crosland Moor, Huddersfield, Yorkshire. He was buried in Kirkheaton.
