= Wuthering Heights (1967 TV series) =

- Genre: Historical drama
- Based on: Wuthering Heights by Emily Brontë
- Written by: Hugh Leonard
- Directed by: Peter Sasdy
- Starring: Ian McShane; Angela Scoular
- Country of origin: United Kingdom
- Original language: English
- No. of series: 1
- No. of episodes: 5

Production
- Producer: David Conroy
- Editor: Bob Rymer
- Running time: 50 minutes
- Production company: BBC

Original release
- Network: BBC Two
- Release: 28 October – 18 November 1967

Wuthering Heights is a five-part British television series which first aired on BBC 2 in 1967. It is an adaptation of the 1847 novel Wuthering Heights by Emily Brontë.

Much of the show was filmed at Kildwick Hall in Yorkshire.

Produced and broadcast in colour, the series had its original videotape masters wiped for reuse, although black and white film copies survived destruction and are available on DVD.

== Plot summary ==
Young orphan Heathcliff is adopted by the wealthy Earnshaw family and moves into their estate, Wuthering Heights. Soon, the new resident falls for his compassionate foster sister, Cathy. The two share a remarkable bond that seems unbreakable until Cathy, feeling the pressure of social convention, suppresses her feelings and marries Edgar Linton, a man of means who befits her status. Heathcliff vows to win her back.

== Main cast ==
- Ian McShane as Heathcliff
- Angela Scoular as Catherine Earnshaw
- John Garrie as Joseph
- Anne Stallybrass as Ellen
- Anthony Edwards as Robert
- James Haswell as Manservant
- Jeremy Longhurst as Lockwood
- William Marlowe as Hindley
- Angela Douglas as Isabella Linton
- Drewe Henley as Edgar Linton
- Keith Buckley as Hareton

== Bibliography ==
- Ellen Baskin. Serials on British Television, 1950-1994. Scolar Press, 1996.
