= Farnhill =

Village and civil parish in North Yorkshire, England

Coordinates: 53.914650°N 1.993870°W

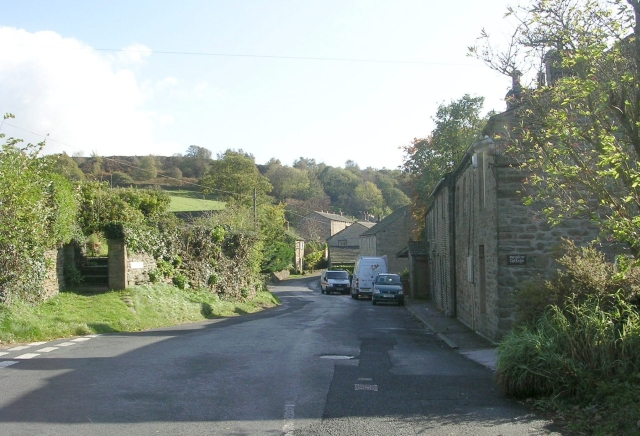
- Main Street, Farnhill

- Location within North Yorkshire
- Population: 509 (2011 census)
- OS grid reference: SE005465
- Civil parish: Farnhill
- Unitary authority: North Yorkshire
- Ceremonial county: North Yorkshire
- Region: Yorkshire and the Humber
- Country: England
- Sovereign state: United Kingdom
- Post town: KEIGHLEY
- Postcode district: BD20
- Police: North Yorkshire
- Fire: North Yorkshire
- Ambulance: Yorkshire

Farnhill is a village and civil parish in the county of North Yorkshire, England. It is situated near Sutton-in-Craven and about 4 miles (6.4 km) south-east of Skipton. Farnhill is also across the canal from Kildwick and there is a church in Kildwick. There is a primary school next to the church and Farnhill backs up on to the moors. There are around 500 people living in Farnhill.

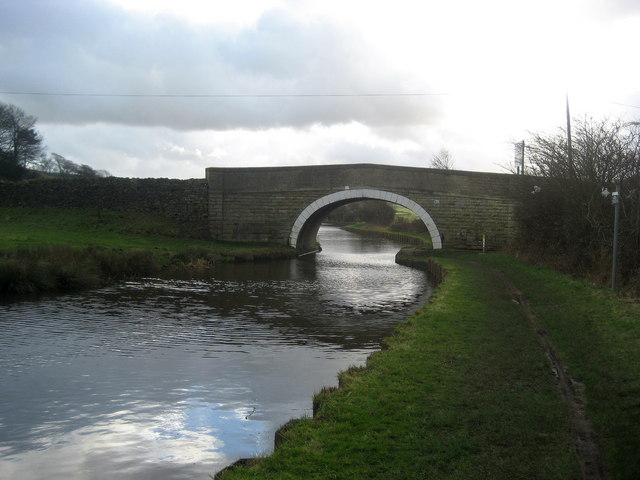
Bridge over the Leeds and Liverpool Canal at Farnhill

The name Farnhill derives from the Old English fearnhyll meaning 'fern hill'.

To the south of the village is Farnhill Hall, a Grade I listed fortified manor house, dating from the 15th century but much altered.

Until 1974 it was part of the West Riding of Yorkshire. From 1974 to 2023 it was part of the Craven District, it is now administered by the unitary North Yorkshire Council.

== See also ==
- Listed buildings in Farnhill
