= Kildwick Hall =

House in Kildwick, North Yorkshire, England

Coordinates: 53°54′46″N 1°59′01″W

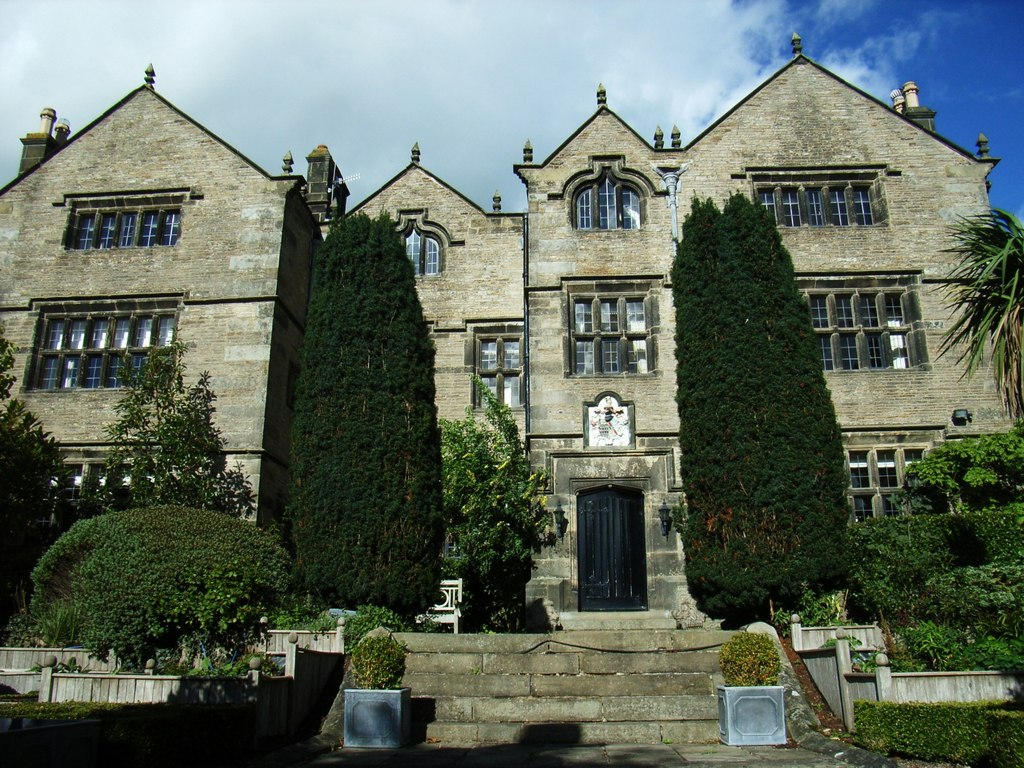
The building, in 2010

Kildwick Hall is a historic building in Kildwick, a village in North Yorkshire, in England.

The manor house was probably built in about 1650 for Henry Currer. The kitchen was added in 1673, and the house was altered between 1722 and 1724, and again in the mid 19th century. In 1955, the building was sold and converted into a hotel, later becoming a country club and a restaurant, before being reconverted into a house in the 1990s. In 1967, the property was used to film the television adaptation of Wuthering Heights. The hall has been grade II* listed since 1954.

The house is built of gritstone, with quoins, and a stone slate roof with gable copings, moulded kneelers and pyramidal finials. It has three storeys and four gabled bays, the outer bays and the third bay, with a two-storey porch, slightly projecting. The porch contains a doorway with a moulded surround, and a triangular head, above which is a hood mould, and a moulded plaque with a coat of arms in relief. The windows in the lower two floors are mullioned and transomed, those in the upper floor are mullioned, two of them with ogee heads, and all have hood moulds. At the rear is a three-bay kitchen range from 1673 linked to the house. Inside, the fireplace in the front right room has a 17th-century overmantel, and 18th-century plasterwork on the ceiling, in the Gothick style. Several other rooms have early panelling and plasterwork, including 17th-century ceiling panels on the first floor landing. The main staircase is early and built of stone, and its first half-landing is lit by a window with early painted glass.

== See also ==
- Grade II* listed buildings in North Yorkshire (district)
- Listed buildings in Kildwick
