= Steeton with Eastburn =

Civil parish in West Yorkshire, England

Coordinates: 53.896°N 1.948°W

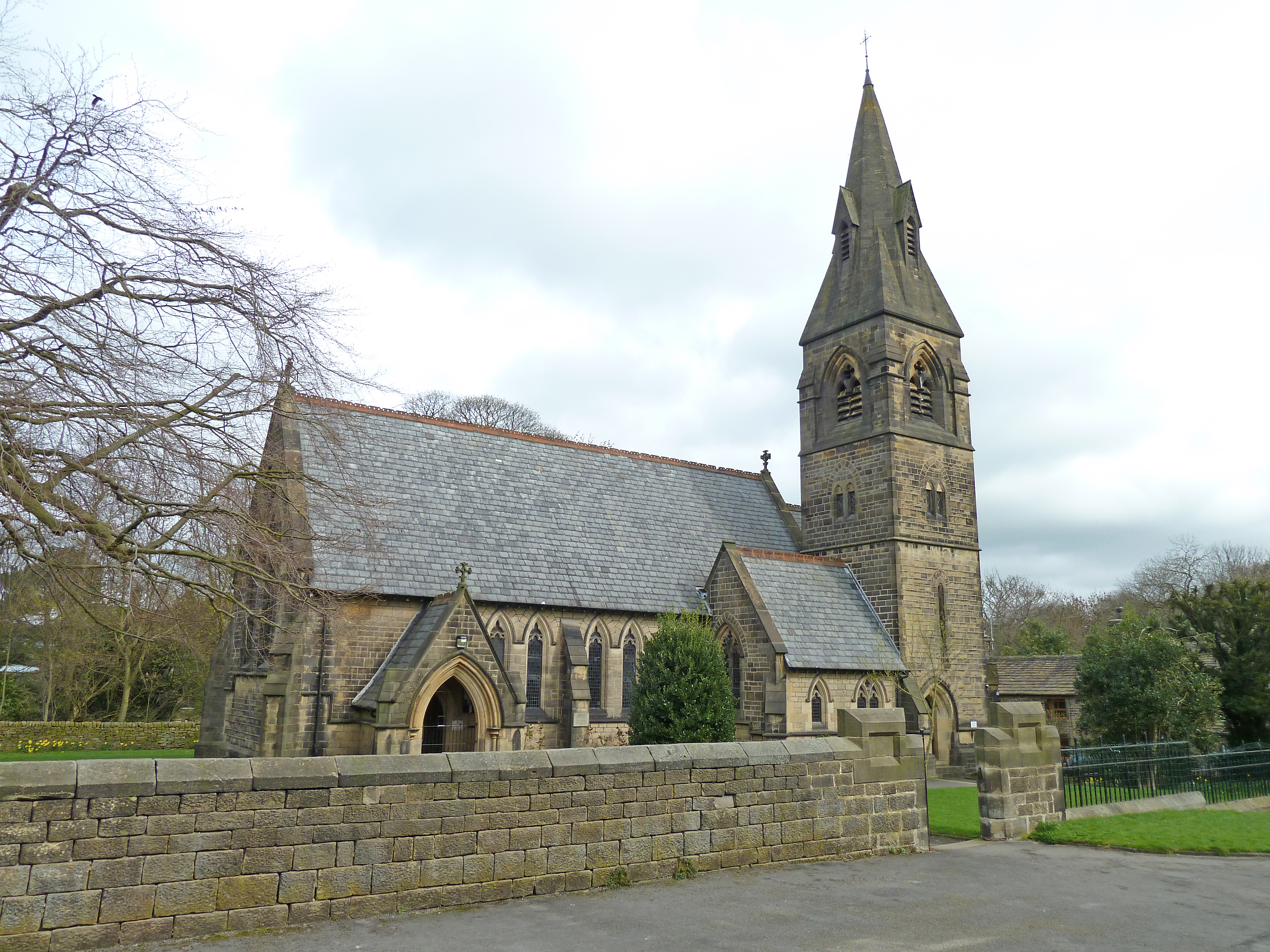
- St Stephen's parish church

- Location within West Yorkshire
- Population: 4,375 (2011)
- OS grid reference: SE034444
- Civil parish: Steeton with Eastburn
- Metropolitan borough: City of Bradford
- Metropolitan county: West Yorkshire
- Region: Yorkshire and the Humber
- Country: England
- Sovereign state: United Kingdom
- Post town: KEIGHLEY
- Postcode district: BD20
- Dialling code: 01535
- Police: West Yorkshire
- Fire: West Yorkshire
- Ambulance: Yorkshire
- UK Parliament: Keighley

Steeton with Eastburn is a civil parish within the City of Bradford Metropolitan District, West Yorkshire, England. Historically part of the West Riding of Yorkshire, it has, according to the 2001 census, a population of 4,277, increasing to 4,375 at the 2011 Census. The parish includes the villages of Steeton and Eastburn.

It has a small parish school and public transport links to local towns and cities. It also has a local newsagents, a transport cafe and a children's park. On the outskirts of Steeton is Steeton and Silsden Station.

Located in the parish is Airedale General Hospital, which lies between Steeton and Eastburn.

== History ==
The Domesday Book of 1086 lists Steeton and Eastburn as belonging to Gamal Barn including 5¼ carucates of ploughland (630 acres/262 ha). The Norman Conquest of England made it part of the lands of Gilbert Tison, but by 1118 Tison had suffered a demotion and his lands returned to the king. They were then given to Lord Percy.

== Governance ==
The parish is part of the Craven ward of the Metropolitan borough of the City of Bradford, part of the Metropolitan county of West Yorkshire.
