= Major Churches Network =

Organisation within the Church of England

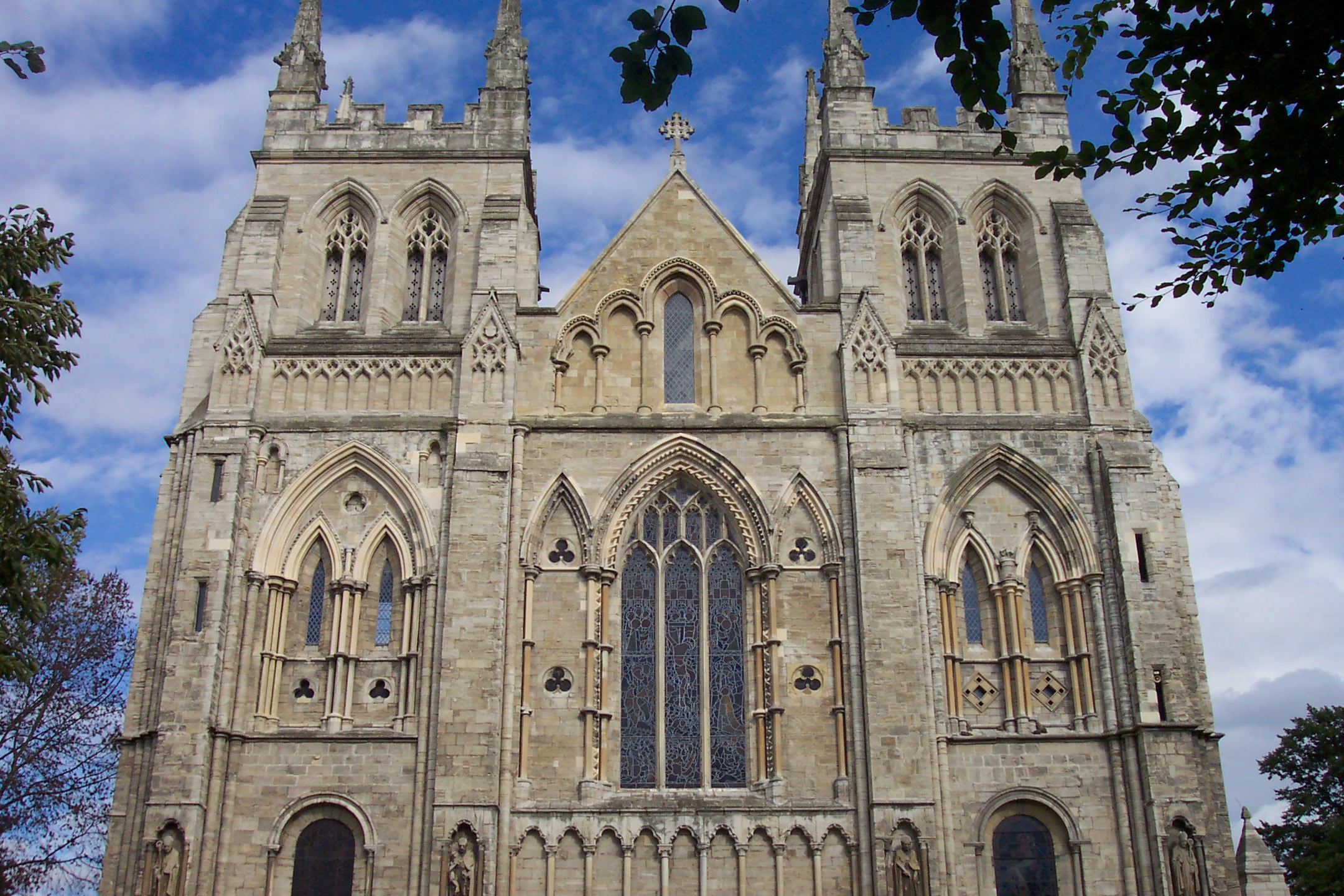
The west end of Selby Abbey

The Major Churches Network, founded in 1991 as the Greater Churches Network, is a group of Church of England parish churches defined as having exceptional significance, being physically very large (over 1000m^{2} footprint), listed as Grade I, II* (or exceptionally II), open to visitors daily, having a role or roles beyond those of a typical parish church, and making a considerable civic, cultural, and economic contribution to their community.

These buildings are often former monastic properties which became parish churches after the English Reformation, or civic parish churches built at a time of great wealth.

As of March 2026 the Church of England designated 322 churches as Major Parish Churches, which are thus eligible to join the Major Churches Network.

== Greater Churches Network ==
The Greater Churches Network was founded in 1991 as a self-help organisation within the Church of England. It aimed to provide help and mutual support to its member churches in dealing with the special problems of running a "cathedral-like" church with the organisation and financial structure of a parish church. The group met every two years in conference to share ideas. These Greater Churches were defined as "non-cathedral churches which, by virtue of their great age, size, historical, architectural, or ecclesiastical importance, display many of the characteristics of a cathedral", and those which "fulfil a role which is additional to that of a normal parish church". At its disbanding in 2019 there were 55 churches within the Greater Churches Network.

== Refounding ==
In May 2019, a meeting of the Greater Churches Network took a decision to rename the group as the Major Churches Network, and to adopt a new constitution. The Greater Churches Network was therefore formally closed, and the new Major Churches Network was formed, and its inaugural general meeting took place.

The change was made in response to a study commissioned into Major Parish Churches under the auspices of the Church Buildings Council, the official body with overall responsibility for the Church of England parish churches and chapels, together with Historic England and the National Lottery Heritage Fund. This resulted in the appointment of a Cathedrals and Major Churches Officer within the CBC, and the identification of around 300 churches in England which met certain agreed criteria. These define a Major Parish Church as having exceptional significance, being physically very large (over 1000m2 footprint), listed as Grade I, II* (or exceptionally II), open to visitors daily, having a role or roles beyond those of a typical parish church, and making a considerable civic, cultural, and economic contribution to their community. All churches recognised as Major Churches by the CBC are eligible to join the Major Churches Network.

Several of these buildings are former monastic properties that were converted to parish church use after the English Reformation; others are large parish churches built at a time of great wealth. What they have in common are the requirements to offer facilities to many visitors, host special services, offer community access and fund the specialist maintenance and repair of these large buildings, most of which are Grade I listed.
