= Steeton, West Yorkshire =

Village in West Yorkshire, England

Coordinates: 53.896°N 1.948°W

Steeton
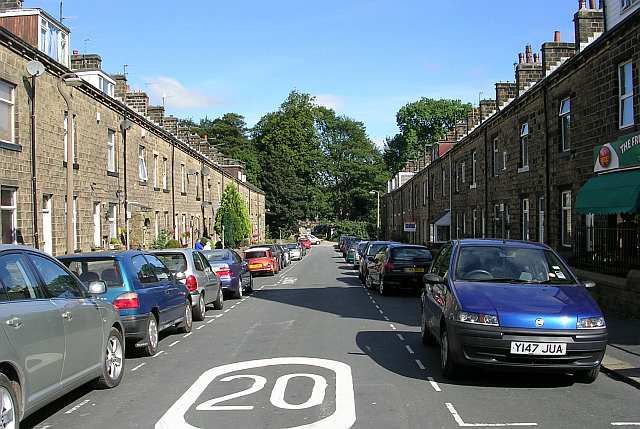
- Elmsley street

- Location within West Yorkshire
- Population: 4,375 (2011 Census)
- OS grid reference: SE034444
  - London: 180 mi (290 km) SE
- Civil parish: Steeton with Eastburn
- Metropolitan borough: City of Bradford
- Metropolitan county: West Yorkshire
- Region: Yorkshire and the Humber
- Country: England
- Sovereign state: United Kingdom
- Post town: KEIGHLEY
- Postcode district: BD20
- Dialling code: 01535
- Police: West Yorkshire
- Fire: West Yorkshire
- Ambulance: Yorkshire
- UK Parliament: Keighley

Steeton is a village in the City of Bradford metropolitan borough, West Yorkshire, England. Historically part of the West Riding, it is 5 miles (8 km) south-east of Skipton, 3 miles (5 km) north-west of Keighley and just south of the A629 road. The village is part of Steeton with Eastburn civil parish.

== History ==
The name Steeton derives from the Old English styfictūn meaning 'tree stump settlement'.

The village is mentioned in the Domesday book along with Eastburn, Grassington, Linton and Threshfield as belonging to Gamelbar.

In 1752–53 the Keighley and Kendal Turnpike followed Hollins Bank Road with the toll bar situated at the bottom of Steeton Bank. An inn named the “Pack Horse” was located nearby.

The first toll gate on the turnpike was set up in 1753 at "Steeton Cross" at the foot of the hill. When the new road past Hawkcliffe Farm was made, the bar was removed to what is now called "Old Bar-house" to intercept the traffic by Old Bar-house Lane as well as that by the new road.

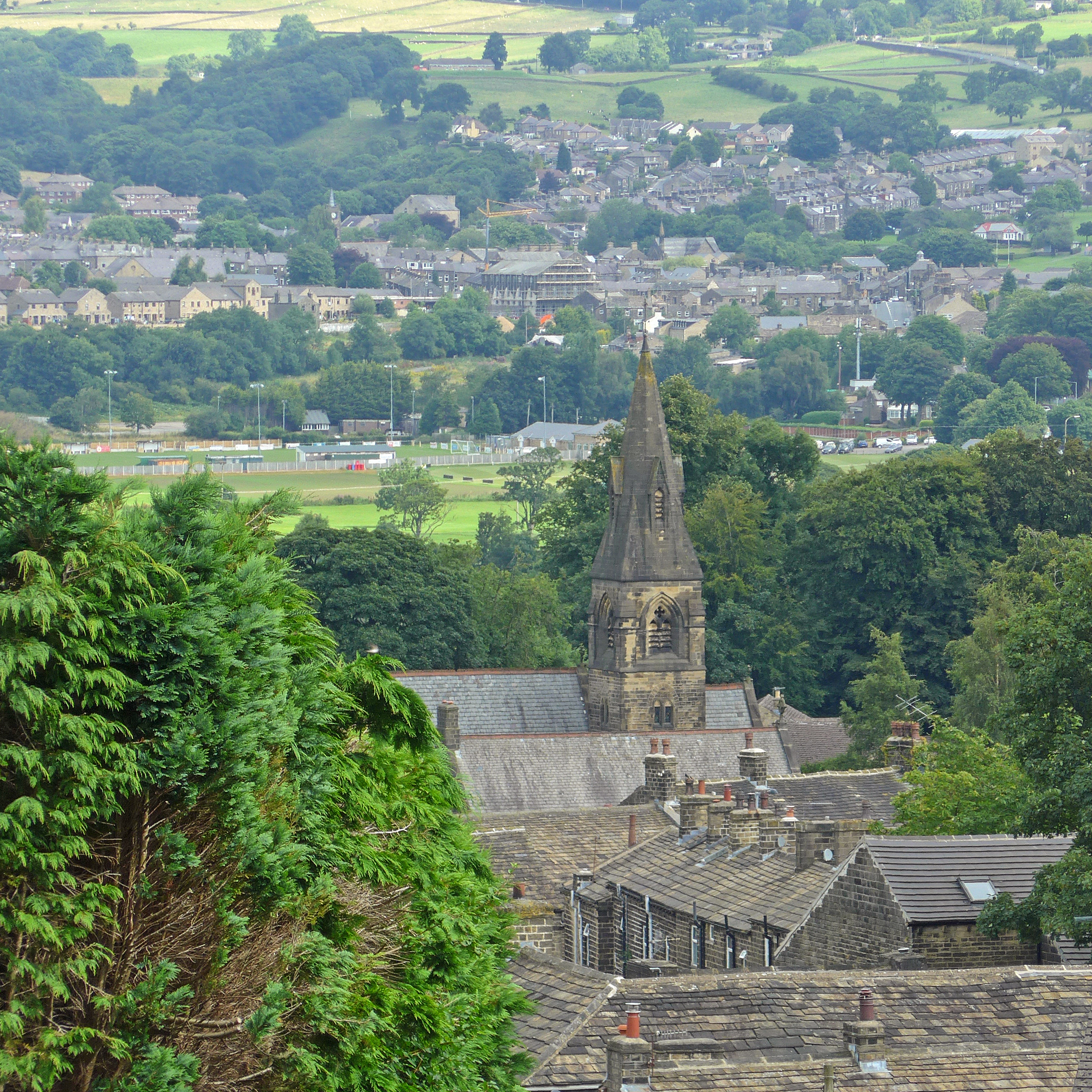
St Stephen's Church

Numbers 14–20 High Street, during the second half of the 18th century, used to be an inn called the "Star", but its licence and name were moved to a new building at the road junction on the main turnpike road to the north, the present A629. The pub was called the "Old Star" as seen on Google Maps Street View and is on the OLD A629, on the corner of that road and Station Road. The Old Star closed in 2014 and was subsequently converted into 3 houses.

Numbers 44 and 46 Upper School Street, built in the Queen Anne period, during the 1770s became the "Goat’s Head" on the original route of the Keighley to Kendal turnpike down. Following its realignment the inn's name and licence was moved to its present building opposite the Station Road junction. The second location, with quoined angles, gable stacks and integral canted bay windows, was probably built as a farmhouse in the mid-18th century.

A rare two-storey Second World War pillbox in the village was listed by English Heritage for protection status in 2010. the pillbox along with two others on the site, was constructed as a defence for the former Royal Ordnance Factory that operated in the village during the Second World War. The plant opened in 1940 and produced over 200 million munition components before the end of the war.

== Governance ==
The village is part of the civil parish of Steeton with Eastburn. The parish is part of the Craven ward of the Metropolitan borough of the City of Bradford, part of the Metropolitan county of West Yorkshire.

== Population ==
According to the 2011 census, 4,375 people were resident in the Steeton with Eastburn civil parish. By the 2021 census this had risen to 5,211.

== Facilities ==
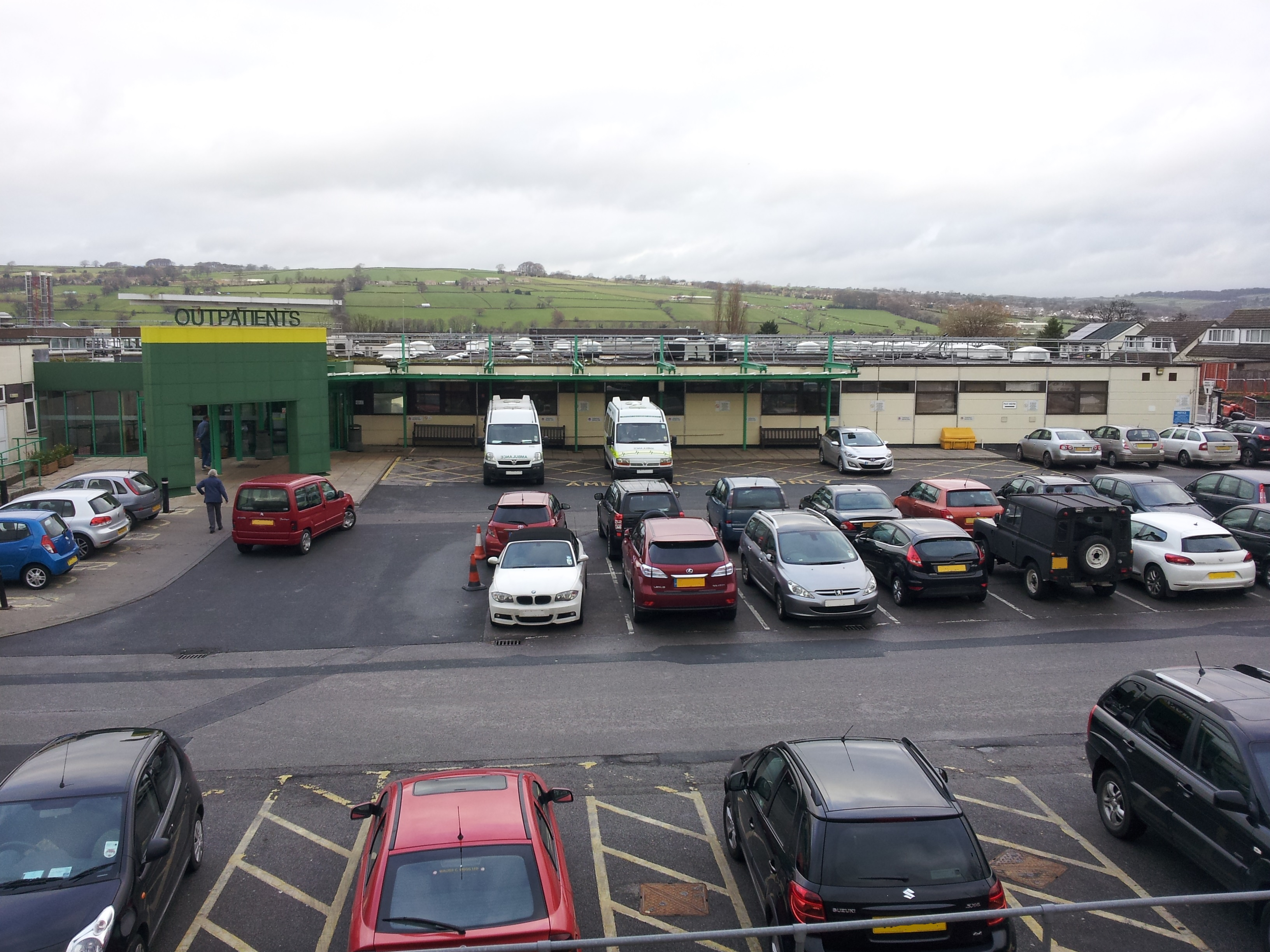
Airedale General Hospital

The village has a major hospital, (Airedale General Hospital), a Pie Shop, a news agency, three hair dressing salons, a fruit shop, a Chinese takeaway, a transport cafe, two parks, a public house, a bowling green, a war memorial, two village greens, a football pitch, a cricket pitch, a graveyard, a primary school, an hotel, a Church of England church and a Methodist church, the railway station multi-storey car park. A Morrisons local store was also opened in the village in May 2014, but this became a My Local store when Morrisons withdrew from the village. Since then the site of the old Morrisons has become a Co-op Food store.

== Education ==
Steeton Primary School is the village primary school which formed in 1851, which also has an intake of pupils from the Keighley area. Children in the west of the village may also attend Eastburn Infant & Junior School in the bordering village of Eastburn. For secondary education, most children attend South Craven School in Cross Hills, with grammar school students attending either Ermysted's Grammar School, Skipton Girls' High School, both in Skipton, or Carlton Keighley or Holy Family, both in Keighley.

== Transport ==
Buses from Keighley and district pass through every seven minutes. Steeton and Silsden railway station, which also serves the neighbouring town of Silsden, lies on the outskirts of the village.
