= Eastburn, West Yorkshire =

Village in West Yorkshire, England

Coordinates: 53.895°N 1.973°W

Eastburn
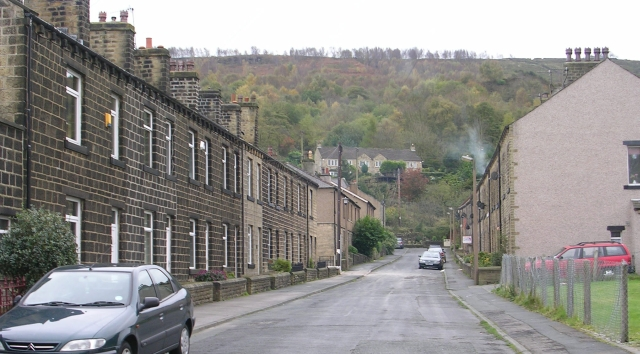
- Sun Street, Eastburn

- Location within West Yorkshire
- Population: 1,614
- Civil parish: Steeton with Eastburn
- Metropolitan borough: City of Bradford
- Metropolitan county: West Yorkshire
- Region: Yorkshire and the Humber
- Country: England
- Sovereign state: United Kingdom
- Post town: KEIGHLEY
- Postcode district: BD20
- Police: West Yorkshire
- Fire: West Yorkshire
- Ambulance: Yorkshire
- UK Parliament: Keighley

Eastburn is a village within the Steeton with Eastburn civil parish, in the City of Bradford Metropolitan District, West Yorkshire, England. The road through Eastburn is approximately 1/2 mile long and has a post office. The village also contains a school (Eastburn Junior & Infant School), a small chapel, a farm, a factory and a former mill building which houses many businesses.

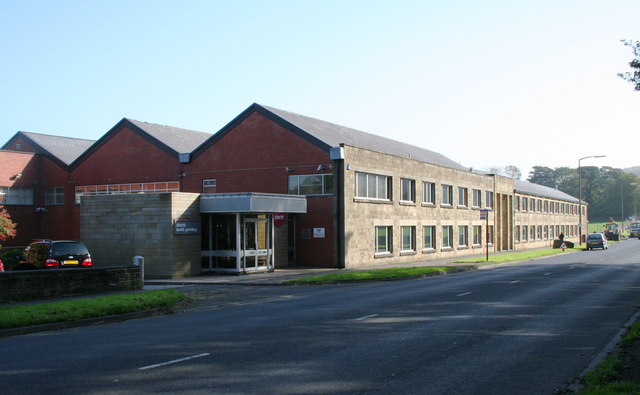
Cinetic Landis Ltd

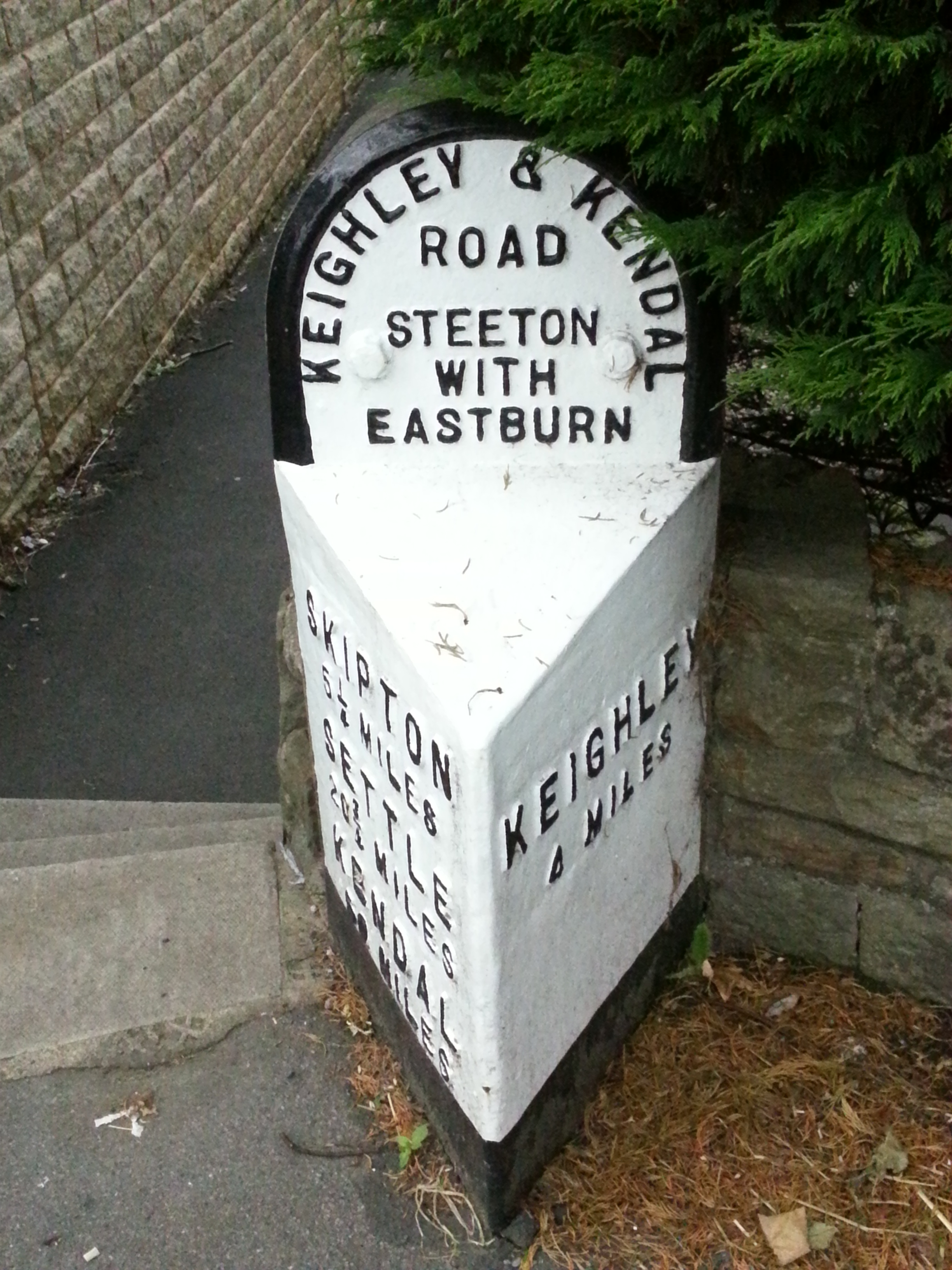
Eastburn has this Grade II listed milestone

== Governance ==
The village is part of the civil parish of Steeton with Eastburn. The parish is part of the Craven ward of the Metropolitan borough of the City of Bradford, part of the Metropolitan county of West Yorkshire.

== Population ==
Population according to the 2011 census:

| Variable | Measure | Eastburn | The area | Bradford |
|---|---|---|---|---|
| All people | Count | 1,614 | 12,643 | 522,452 |
| Males | Count | 766 | 6,076 | 257,132 |
| Females | Count | 848 | 6,567 | 265,320 |
| Population density (number of people per hectare) | Rate | 11.0 | 3.4 | 14.3 |
