= History of Skipton =

History of the English town

The small town of Skipton in North Yorkshire, England, has been around as far back as 1085, and is listed in the Domesday Book of 1086. It has had roles in history during the English Civil War and as the site of a prisoner-of-war camp during both the First World War and Second World War.

== Pre-Conquest ==
Evidence for prehistoric habitation in the Skipton area includes an "important outlying group" of cup and ring marked rocks on Skipton Moor, to the south-east of the town, and in the same area there is an enclosed Iron Age hilltop settlement.

== Middle Ages ==
Skipton has an entry in the Domesday Book, the great survey of England compiled in 1085 by William I.

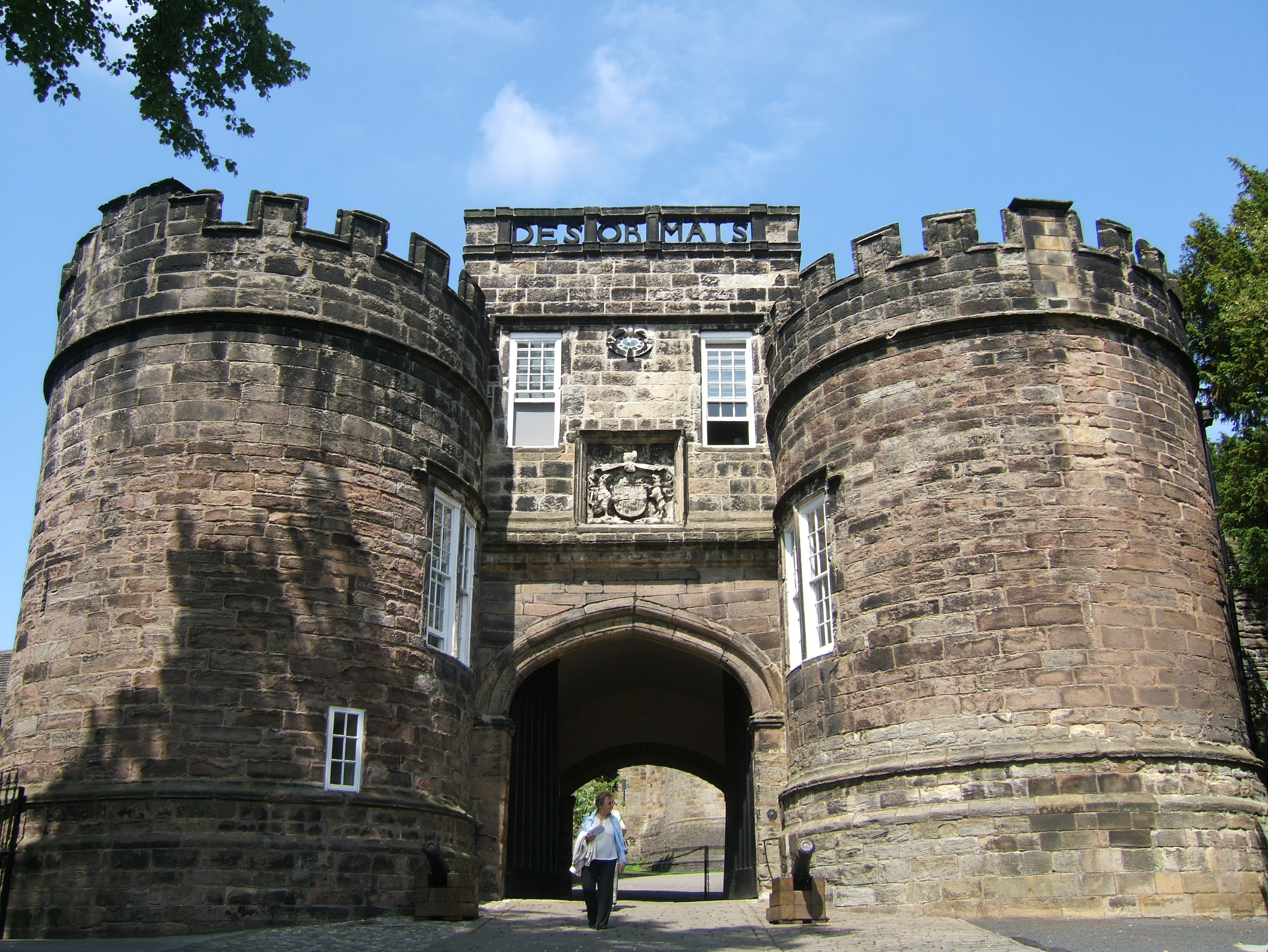
Gatehouse of Skipton Castle

Skipton Castle was built in the 11th century, probably around 1090 by Robert de Romille, who came over from Normandy with William I in 1066.

Reginaldus Flandrensis witnessed a Skipton charter around 1130. "He held an office of trust as Seneschal of Skipton Castle, and we must assume that these lands were given to him at about that time as a reward for his services. They amounted to 1 Knight's fee and 14 carucates, and were held under Skipton Castle for feudal service."

The castle and titles of Skipton passed into the hands of Robert Clifford in 1310, and remained with the Cliffords. The castle was fortified to withstand attacks from Scotland, such as when Skipton was raided during The Great Raid of 1322.

== English Civil War, 1642–1651 ==
During the English Civil War, a Royalist garrison was situated at Skipton Castle, under the command of Sir John Mallory. It was the last remaining Royalist stronghold in North England until its honourable surrender on 20 December 1645 after a three-year siege.

Lady Anne Clifford meticulously restored Skipton Castle after the Civil War.

== Leeds-Liverpool Canal ==
Britain's longest inland waterway (127 miles), the Leeds-Liverpool Canal took 46 years to build, and finally came in at five times the original budget. The first part to open was the lock-free section from Skipton to Bingley, in 1773. The entire canal was opened in 1816 and was busy all through the nineteenth century and carried stone, coal, wool, cotton, limestone, grain, and other goods.

In 1906 the Leeds Liverpool Canal carried 2,337,401 tons of cargo an average distance of 22 miles, and produced £180,000 in revenue.

=== Proposal for River Aire Navigation, 1744 ===
Even before the Leeds Liverpool Canal was proposed, there was great demand for better transport facilities. Bingley was a centre for the lime trade, and in 1740 Messrs Mawd & Lister of Bingley were selling over 23,000 horse-loads a year of lime. Their locally quarried supply was dwindling, and they were keen to transport lime from Skipton. Accordingly, a petition was made to parliament in 1744 for a Bill to make the River Aire navigable between Bingley and Skipton. The Bill was opposed by Lord Thanet and failed.

=== Begin of construction, 1770 ===
The Act received Royal Assent in May 1770. The construction of the Leeds-Liverpool Canal began almost immediately, and a contract was issued to a John Tickle to arrange the digging from Bingley to Skipton. It seems that there were problems with progress, and in 1772 an order was issued that each contractor in future would be issued a contract for only a one-mile stretch of construction.

=== Opening Bingley to Skipton, 1773 ===
The Leeds Intelligencer reported on 8 April 1773:

"On Thursday last, that part of the Grand Canal from Bingley to Skipton was opened, and two boats laden with coals arrived at the last mentioned place, which were sold at half the price they have hitherto given for that most necessary convenience of life, which is a recent instance, among other, of the great use of canals in general. On which occasion the bells were set ringing at Skipton; there were also bonfires, illuminations, and other demonstrations of joy."

=== Lord Thanet's Canal (Spring Branch), 1773 ===
Lord Thanet in Skipton owned both Skipton Castle and the local limestone quarries. He proposed the construction of a quarter mile branch canal to connect the quarries with the new Leeds Liverpool Canal, after the refusal of the canal company to alter the line previously surveyed. An Act was passed in 1773 in support of this. The branch canal was built quickly. In 1785 the canal company took over the lease.

=== Opening of Skipton – Thackley, 1774 ===
In March 1774 the Bingley Five Rise Locks were first used, the first boat through there taking 29 minutes to navigate the locks.

=== Springs Branch Extension 1794 ===
The Springs Branch canal was extended by another 240 yards and a tramway built to move limestone more easily from the quarries. There was more and more demand for limestone to be used in the new Low Moor Ironworks, Bradford, for iron smelting.

=== Opening of Foulridge Tunnel, 1796 ===
It took years to solve the problems involved in navigation westwards from Skipton. A tunnel had to be built at Foulridge.

=== Limestone Tramway, Haw Bank Quarry, 1836 ===
The tramway from the Haw Bank Quarry (in what is now Skipton Rock, just the other side of the A65 bypass) originally ended high above the Springs Branch Canal and stone was dropped about 100 feet (30 m) into boats from chutes. This was a noisy operation and Lord Thanet, the occupant of Skipton Castle, demanded an extension of the tramway to the main canal. This was refused by the canal company, but a new tramway was built in 1836. By this time Haw Bank Quarry was producing 80,000 tons of limestone a year. Sometime into the 2000s Tarmac Northern Ltd moved into the quarry and started operating out of the site, in 2007 the Quarry shutdown from being dug up and now is just a housing site for Tarmac Northern Ltd.

== The Industrial Revolution, 1780s-1900 ==
Skipton boomed during the Industrial Revolution, as it lay on the Leeds-Liverpool Canal, between the major cities of Leeds and Liverpool. Many mills sprung up, including:

- High Corn Mill – The first industrial mill built in Skipton was High Mill, in 1785. Built at the entrance to Skipton Woods, it was a cotton spinning mill powered by water. In 1825 an annex was added with steam power. High Mill was built by Peter Garforth, John Blackburn and James B. Sidgwick. By all accounts Mr Sidgwick was very much in favour of corporal punishment being applied in his premises whenever necessary. High Mill was abandoned when the lease fell in and could not be re-negotiated.
- Belle Vue Mills – Built 1828 by Thomas Dewhurst, Belle Vue Mills on Broughton Road in Skipton was built and opened as a spinning and weaving mill "John Dewhurst & Sons" in 1829, but burned down 1831, two years later, and was immediately rebuilt, this time as a cotton mill. It is not known how many looms there were to start with, but in 1852 an extension was added to allow another 385 looms to be housed. In 1870 a further extension was added. In 1882 Dewhurst's had a floor area of 20,000 square yards spread over 5 storeys, and employed over 800 workers. In 1886 electric lighting was installed. The Belle Vue Mills did spinning, weaving, and made sewing cotton named Sylko and dyeing and in 1897 was bought by the English Sewing Cotton Company.

Belle Vue Mill was the home of Kingsley Cards until 2006, and is now a property development.

- Low Mill / Sackville Mill – Built in 1839 by John Benson Sidgwick for weft spinning and weaving, on Sackville Street, Skipton. It became known as the Silk Mill after its sale in 1892 to Rickard's of Airton, who used it in silk making. The mill burned down to the ground in 1908, resulting in the loss of 300 jobs in the town. A new mill called Sackville Mill was erected on the same site, and was later occupied by Yorkshire Water Authority, before eventually being demolished to make way for housing.
- Firth Shed – Built 1877, by Samuel Farey, housing 300 looms. Extended in 1906 to add another 200 looms. Manufactured dyed cotton goods and winceys. Farey did not make it through the slump of the 1920s, and sold up to Nutter Ltd of Nelson. Weaving stopped in 1970, and Firth Shed now houses Merrit and Fryer's, the builders' merchants and timber yard.
- Victoria Mill – Owned by International Textile Co Ltd. It is now a block of flats.
- Park Shed / Wilkinson's Mill – Built 1889 by Thomas Wilkinson, and often known as Wilkinson's Mill. Wilkinson's Mill is uncommon in that it is the only mill in Skipton not to be built right next to the canal. Sited on the corner of Shortbank Road and Brougham Street. Park Shed was home to Castle Acoustics, the hi-fi speaker manufacturer. It caught fire in a lightning storm in 2007 and stayed closed throughout the rest of 2007 and 2008 until it was demolished at the end of 2008. The site now is a privately owned housing estate.
- Union Mills – Cotton weaving mill, built 1867 by Skipton Land and Building Company, run by Skipton Mill Co Ltd., designed by J. Whitehead of Nelson. 800 looms manufacturing winceys, stripes and checks. Steam-powered, one-storey shed with attached warehouse. Extension added 1872, dyehouse added 1875. Union Mill is now a housing development.
- Broughton Road Mill – Built 1897 by the Skipton Room and Power Co Ltd. Burned down (levelled) 1958.
- Alexandra Mill – On Keighley Road, Skipton, built 1887 by George Walton, with a weaving shed holding 500 looms, manufacturing dress goods, skirtings and shirtings. Later taken over by Walton Hainsworth and Co.

The Otley Road drill hall was completed in 1892, and signage on the Skipton Auction Mart building refers to 1894 as its year of construction.

== First World War ==
In 1914 there was a military camp, 'Raikeswood Camp', at the head of what is now Salisbury Street, which was used a billet of the Bradford Pals Battalions (16th & 18th Battalions of the West Yorkshire Regiment (Prince of Wales's Own). After the Pals left, the camp was used from January 1918 as a prisoner-of-war camp holding captured German soldiers, some 500 officers and 130 soldiers. The camp was operational until October 1919.

== Second World War ==
Overdale Camp (what is now Overdale Caravan Park) was used as a POW camp during the Second World War and held both Italian and German soldiers.
