= Raikeswood Hospital =

Hospital in North Yorkshire, England

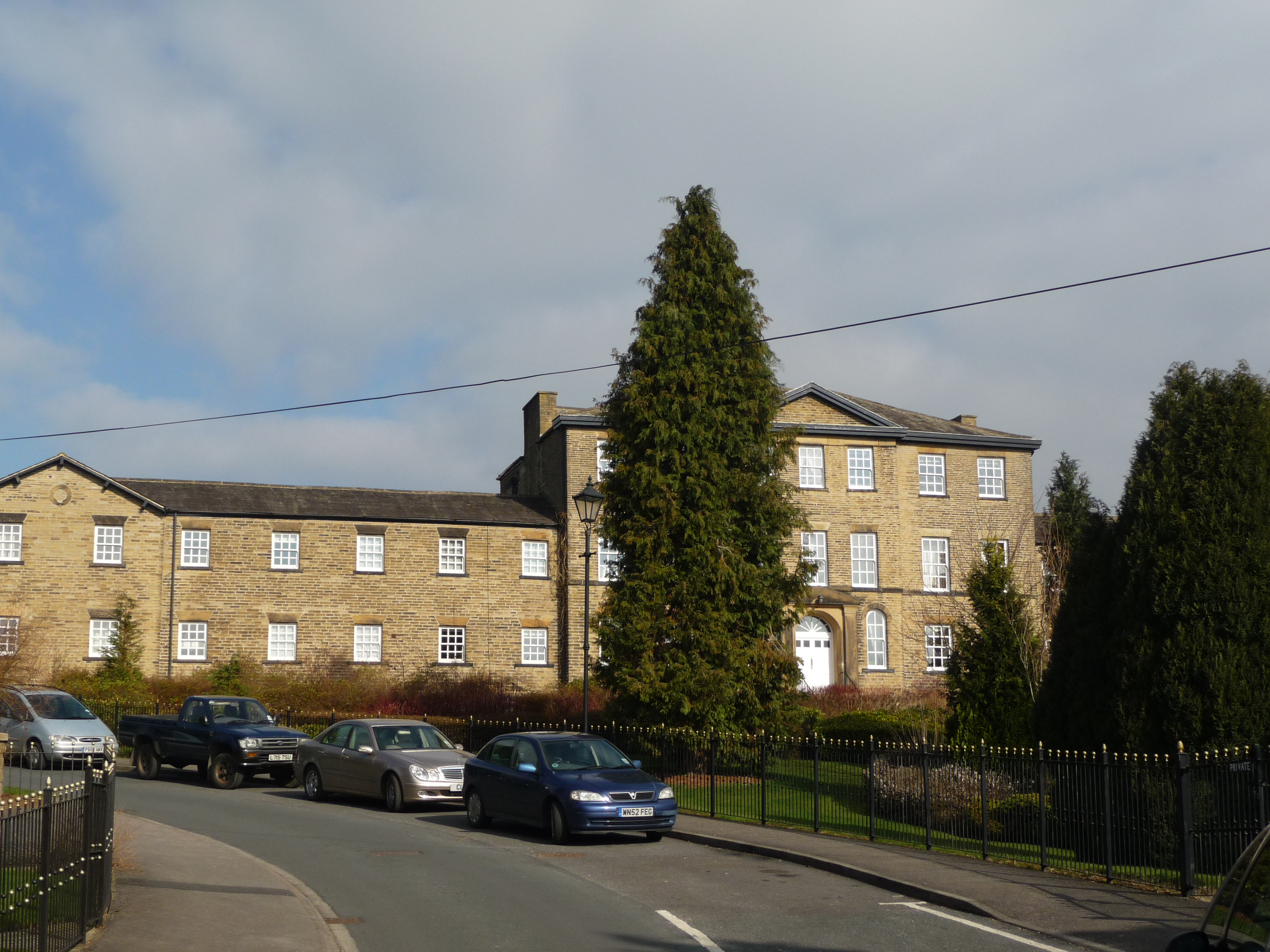
- Raikeswood Hospital

- Shown in North Yorkshire

Geography
- Location: Gargrave Road, Skipton, North Yorkshire, England
- Coordinates: 53.9634°N 2.0244°W

Organisation
- Care system: NHS

Services
- Emergency department: No

History
- Founded: 1840
- Closed: 1991

Links
- Lists: Hospitals in England

Raikeswood Hospital was a health facility in Gargrave Road, Skipton, North Yorkshire, England. It has been converted for residential use and remains a Grade II listed building.

== History ==
The facility had its origins in the Skipton Union Workhouse which was designed by George Webster and opened in 1840. A new infirmary was added in 1900. It became the Skipton Public Assistance Institution in 1930 and then joined the National Health Service as Raikeswood Hospital in 1948. After services had transferred to Skipton General Hospital in April 1991, Raikeswood Hospital closed and was subsequently converted for residential use as Gainsborough Court.

== See also ==
- Listed buildings in Skipton
