= The Castle Inn, Skipton =

Pub in Skipton, North Yorkshire, England

Coordinates: 53°57′48″N 2°01′00″W

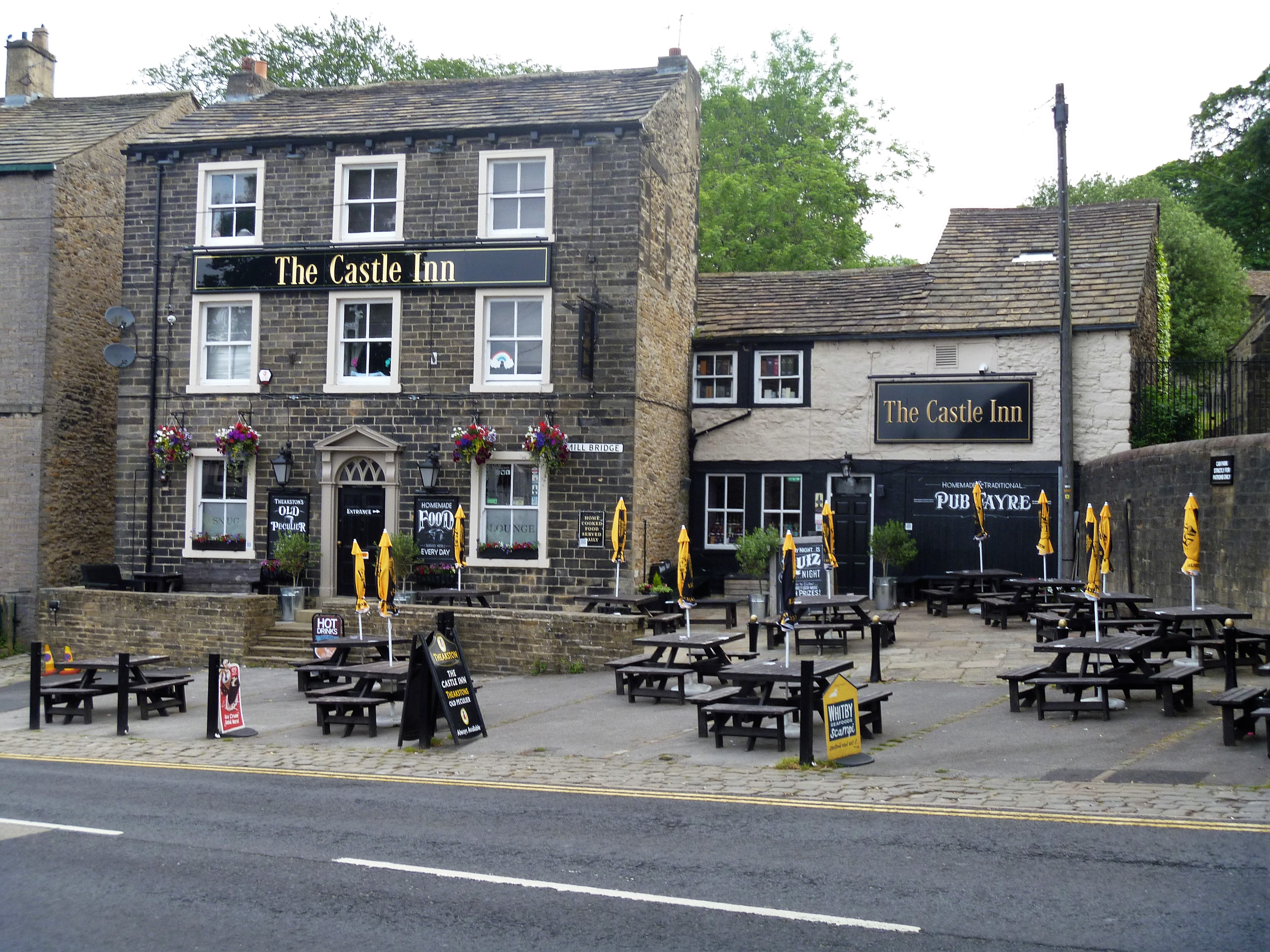
The pub, in 2021

The Castle Inn is a historic pub in Skipton, a town in North Yorkshire, in England.

The pub was built in the early 19th century, on Mill Bridge, by Skipton Castle. The building was grade II listed in 1978. The pub has been refurbished on several occasions, including in 2015 at a cost of £200,000. In 2014, it was named Yorkshire's Top Pub in the White Rose Awards. A local legend states that a ghost of an old woman haunts the building.

The pub is built of stone, with eaves modillions and a slate roof. It has three storeys and three bays. The central doorway has a round-arched head, a semicircular fanlight with Gothic glazing, and a pediment on simple consoles. The windows are sashes, and at the rear is a round-arched stair window. Recessed to the right is the former stable wing, lower, whitewashed, and with two storeys. It contains a barn door, a doorway with a fanlight and a modern window, and on the upper floor are two sash windows and a loft door.

== See also ==
- Listed buildings in Skipton
