= Black Horse, Skipton =

Pub in Skipton, North Yorkshire, England

Coordinates: 53°57′46″N 2°01′00″W

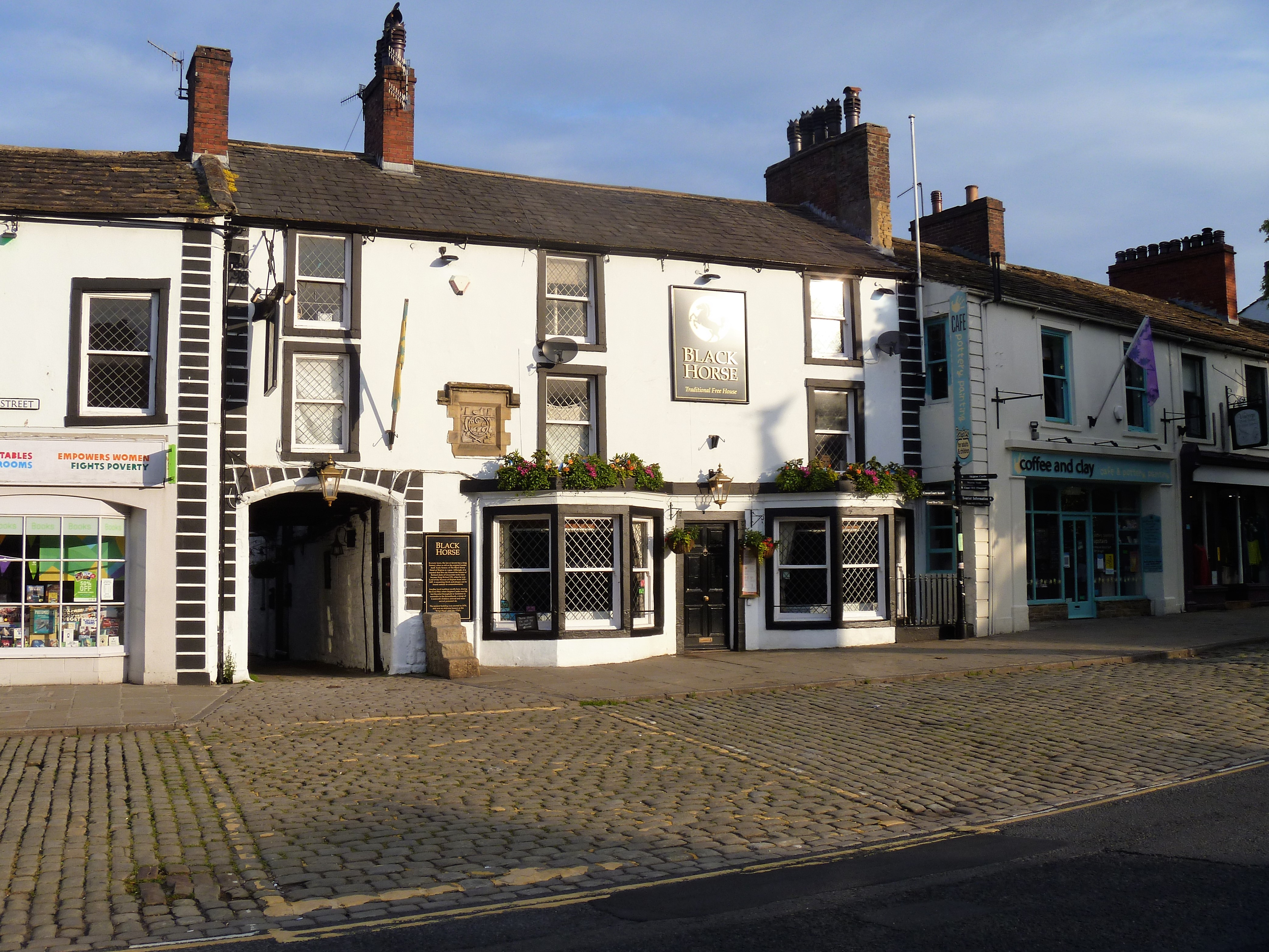
The pub, in 2021

The Black Horse is a historic pub in Skipton, a town in North Yorkshire, in England.

It is uncertain when the building was constructed, with a local tradition claiming that it was the royal mews of Richard III of England in the 1480s. The building has a stone inscribed "1676", and although this has been moved from its original location, some of the building appears to be of this date. In the early 19th century, the pub was an important coaching inn, served by coaches to Leeds and to Kendal. The building was grade II listed in 1978. The building was refurbished in 2018 at a cost of £400,000, at which time it was owned by the Stonegate Pub Company.

The pub is built of stuccoed stone, and has three storeys and three bays. On the front are two bay windows flanking a doorway. To the left is a segmental arch leading to the yard, with a smaller arch and a mounting block. The upper floors have sash windows and a datestone.

== See also ==
- Listed buildings in Skipton
