= The Red Lion, Skipton =

Pub in Skipton, North Yorkshire, England

Coordinates: 53°57′43″N 2°00′58″W

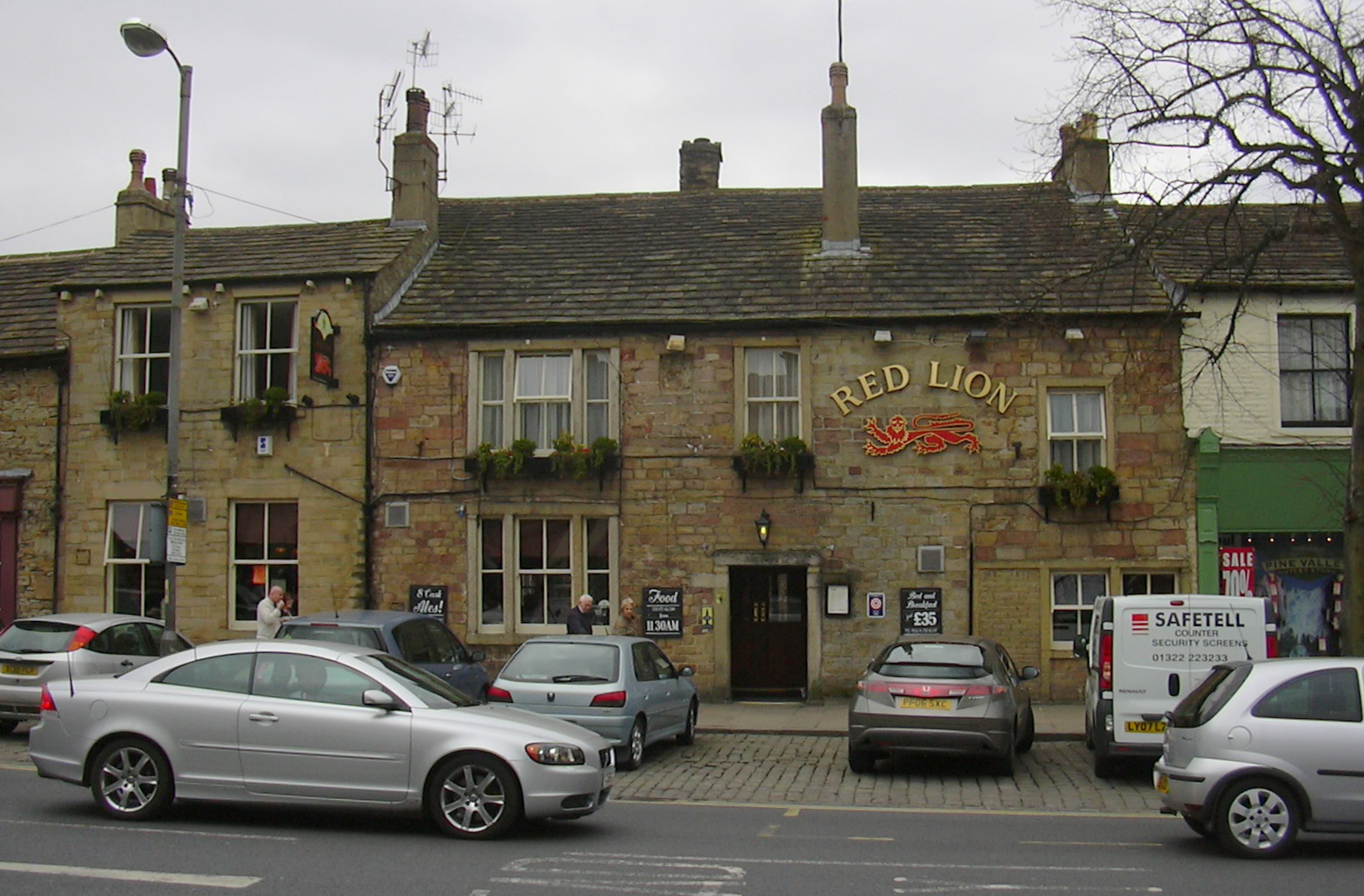
The pub, in 2010

The Red Lion is a historic pub in Skipton, a town in North Yorkshire, in England.

The building was probably constructed around 1500, perhaps on the site of the leper hospital of St Mary Magdalene. It was originally a hall house, but probably in the 17th century, a new front range was added, and a ceiling was installed in the hall. The building served as a farmhouse until World War I, but from at least 1684 it also accommodated a pub named the "Red Lion". The front of the southern end was rebuilt in the 18th century, and the north end in the 19th century, with rear extensions also constructed around these dates. The building was grade II listed in 1978.

The building is constructed of gritstone with sandstone dressings and a stone flag roof. It has two storeys and a C-shaped plan, with a front range and two rear wings. The front range has five bays, the left two bays higher and with paired eaves corbels and windows with wedge lintels. The right three bays contain a doorway with three-light mullioned windows to the left and single-light windows to the right. The rear wings are gabled, and have quoins. In the yard are granite setts and river cobbles, and a well with a circular head. Inside, three 17th-century fireplaces survive, one with the date 1681 above, while the first floor has some timber framing. The cellar has stone steps, a brick vault, flagstone floors, and wall niches with stone shelves.

== See also ==
- Listed buildings in Skipton
