= St Andrew's Church, Skipton =

Church in Skipton, North Yorkshire, England

Coordinates: 53°57′40″N 2°00′51″W

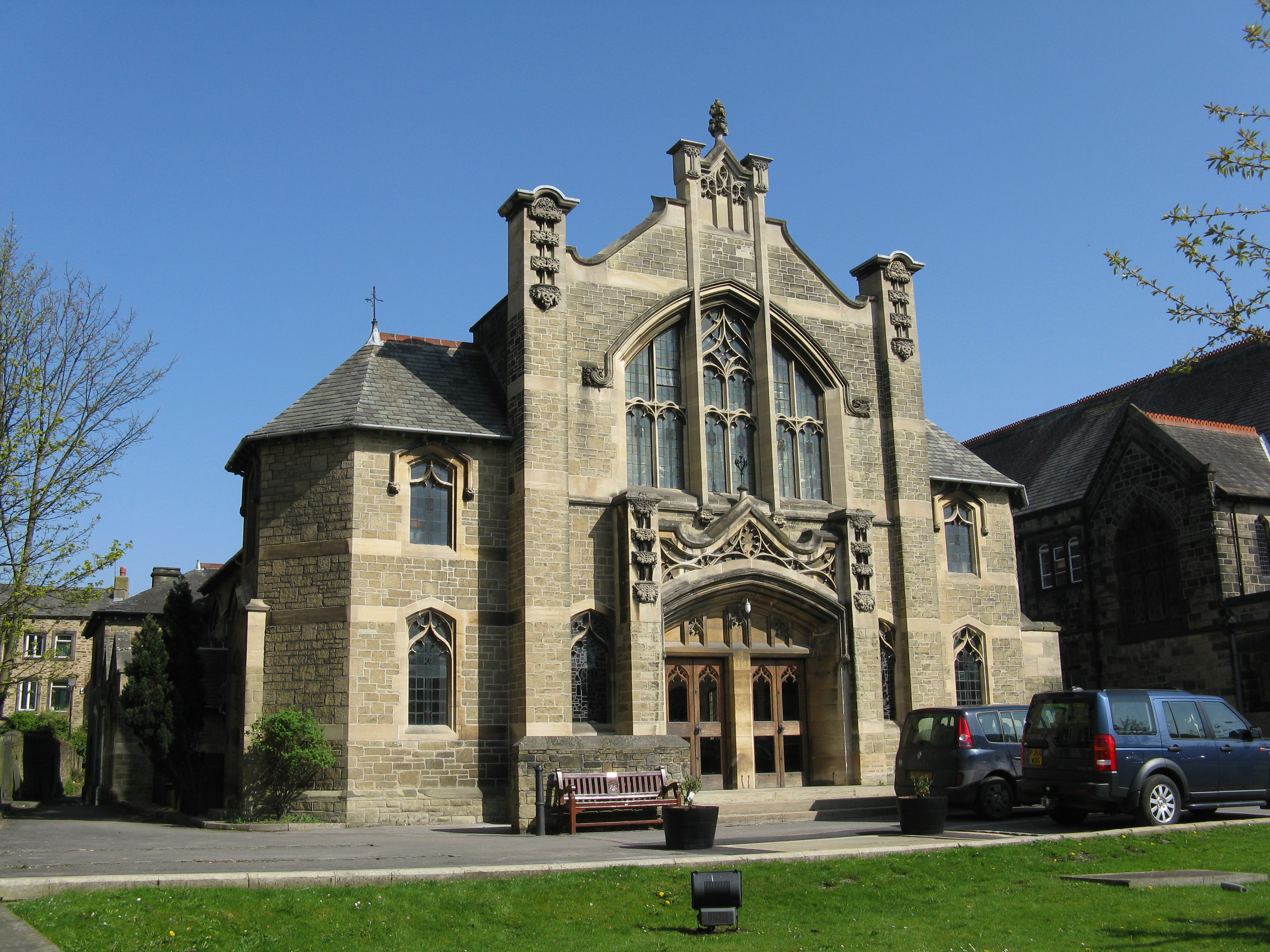
The church, in 2011

St Andrew's Church is a church in Skipton, a town in North Yorkshire, in England.

A Congregationalist church was first built on the site in 1777, which was replaced by a new building in the mid-19th century. In 1892, a Sunday school was erected to its east, which survives as the church hall. The church was demolished and rebuilt between 1914 and 1916, to a design by James Totty. Historic England describes it as "a striking example of a late Art Nouveau and Arts and Crafts-style church that retains a complete and coherent scheme". It was built for the Congregational Union of England and Wales, but as it opened during World War I, its congregation was smaller than anticipated. By 1975, the congregation had further declined, and it formed a partnership with the Skipton United Reformed Church, Broughton Road Methodist Church and Gargrave Road Methodist Church, the four thereafter sharing St Andrew's Church. The building was grade II listed in 2021. The church closed in 2023, the congregation moving to Trinity Church in the town. In 2025, it was marketed for sale for £695,000. The church reopened in October 2026 having been purchased by the Christ Harvest Church.

The church is built of sandstone and limestone, with slate roofs, and is in Art Nouveau and Arts and Crafts styles. It has a cruciform plan, with semi-octagonal half-turrets, a sanctuary, a porch and a vestry. The entrance front facing the road has a decorated gable flanked by buttresses with carvings at the top. It contains a double doorway under a decorated segmental arch, above which is a large window with a pointed arch.

Inside, there is a gallery accessed through a staircase in the east turret, which has steeply tiered seats and an oak parapet, and is supported on iron columns. There is an oak dado throughout, and Art Deco stained glass by William Gamon & Co. There are oak pews and tiered choir stalls, above which is an organ built in 1906 for the former church.

== See also ==
- Listed buildings in Skipton
