= Union Mills, Skipton =

Building in Skipton, North Yorkshire, England

Coordinates: 53.9564°N 2.0168°W

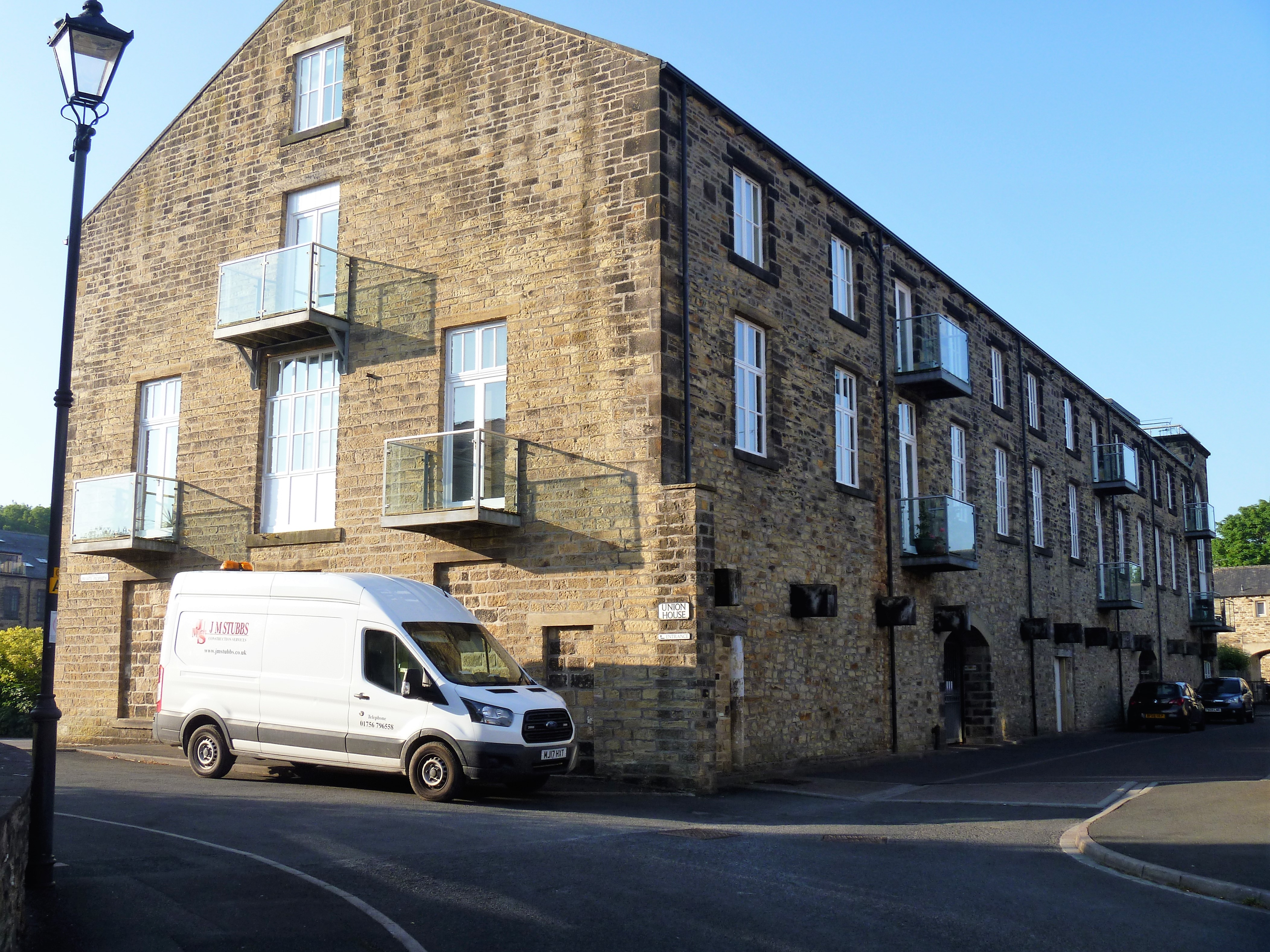
The building, in 2021

Union Mills is a historic building in Skipton, a town in North Yorkshire, in England.

The mill was constructed in 1867 by the Skipton Land & Building Company, to a design by J. Whitehead. It was a particularly compact example of a combined weaving shed and warehouse, but was extended to the south in 1871 and again in 1927. From the start it was intended to be let to tenants; there were four tenants in 1882 and six by 1921. Part of the building was demolished in 1999, and the remainder was converted to form 16 flats. The building has been grade II listed since 1996.

The building is constructed of stone with roofs of Welsh slate and glass. The main building has three storeys and is 13 bays wide. The former engine house, boiler house and chimney are at the south-east corner.

== See also ==
- Listed buildings in Skipton
