= Old Grammar School, Skipton =

Building in Skipton, North Yorkshire, England

Coordinates: 53°57′40″N 2°00′37″W

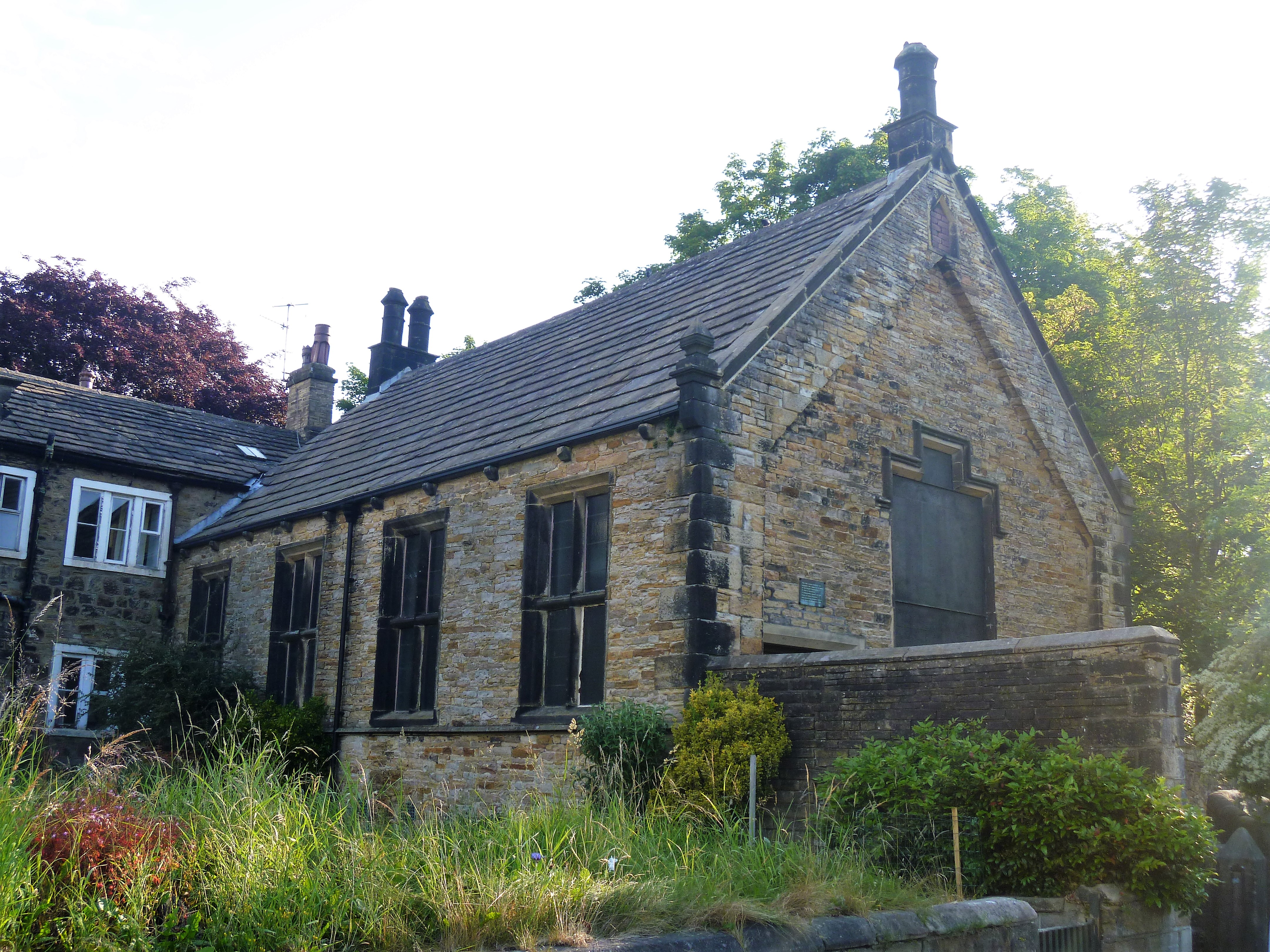
The 15th century building

The Old Grammar School is a historic building in Skipton, a town in North Yorkshire, in England.

The building was probably constructed in the 15th century, as a chapel of the Knights Hospitaller. In 1548, Ermysted's Grammar School moved into the building. It is said that Roundhead troops were accommodated in the building during the English Civil War, and some of their names can still be seen carved in the beams. It was extended around 1700. In 1875, the school moved to a new building; the extension was converted into a private house, while the former chapel spent time as an electricity substation before also becoming a house. Both sections of the building were separately grade II listed in 1952.

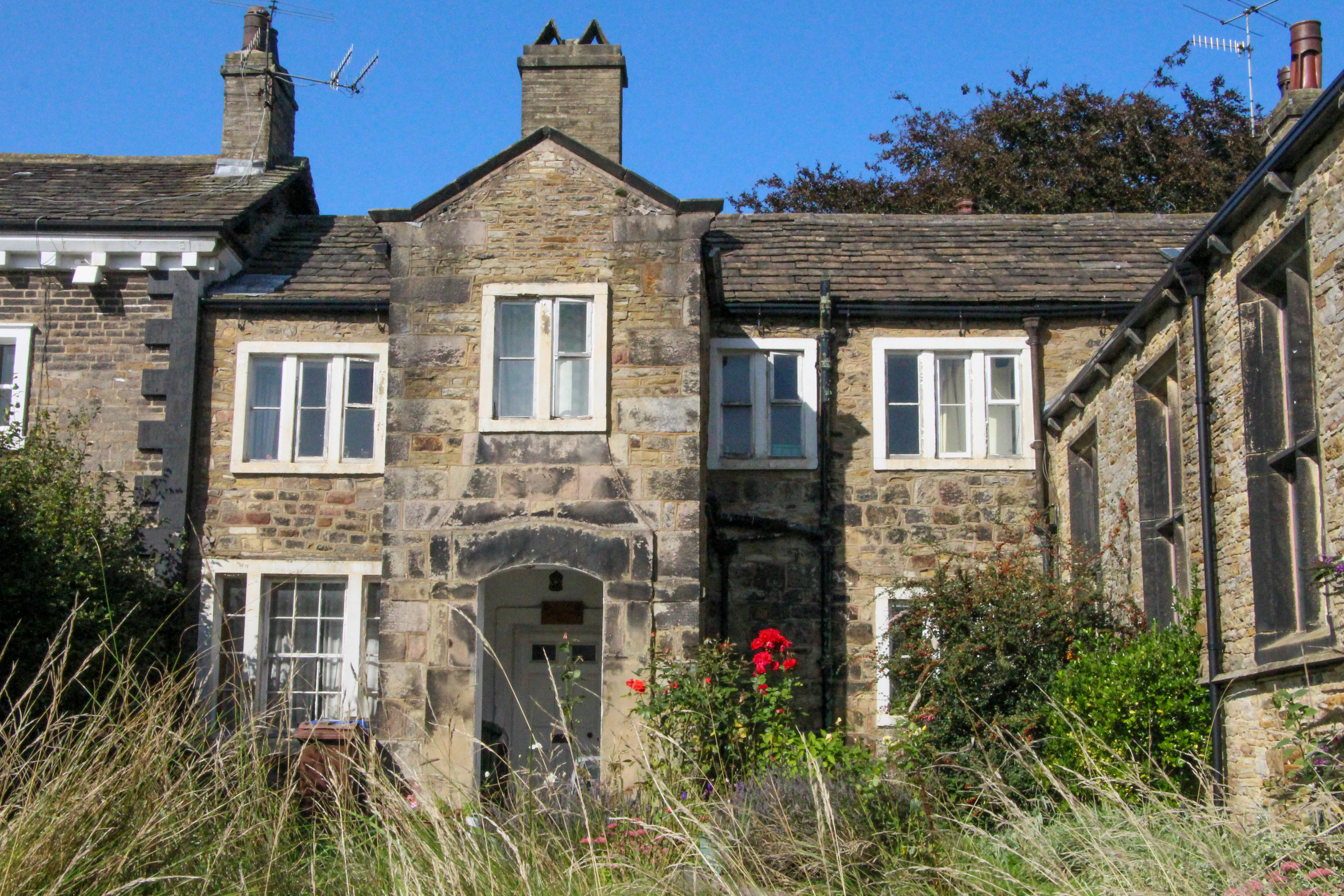
The extension

The former chapel is built of stone, with quoins, and a stone flag roof with moulded coping, springers and finials. It has a single storey and a rectangular plan, the gabled front faces the road, and along the sides are four bays. On the centre of the gabled front is a mullioned and transomed three-light stepped window, to its left is a doorway, and on the gable apex is a small triangular-headed window. Along the sides are cross windows.

The extension is built of stone, with two storeys. On the front is a two-storey gabled porch with quoins, containing an arched entrance. The windows on the front have plain surrounds and are mullioned, and at the rear are windows with round-arched lights.

== See also ==
- Listed buildings in Skipton
