= The Skipton Academy =

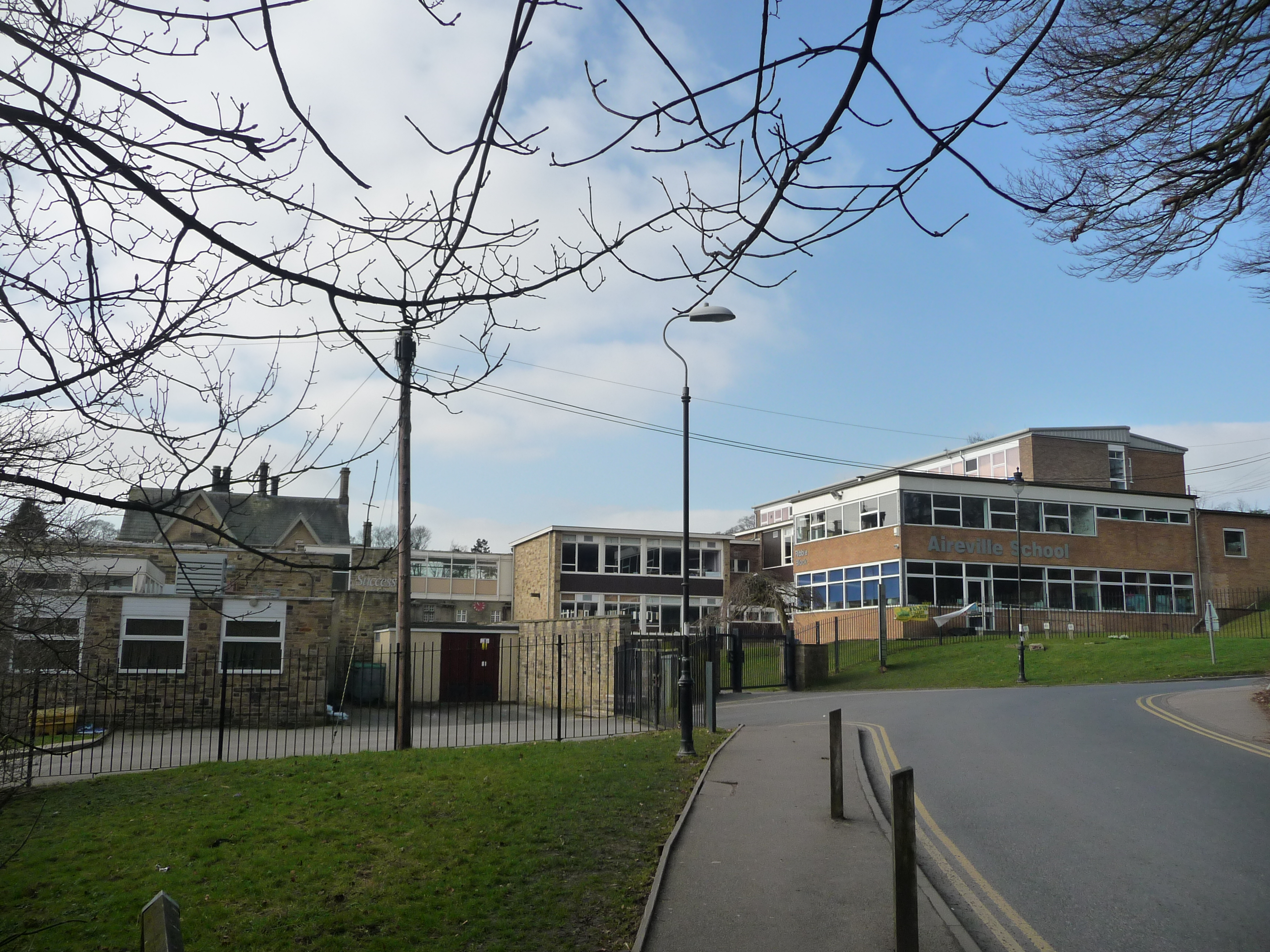
- Aireville School in 2011

Location
- Gargrave Road; Skipton; North Yorkshire, BD23 1UQ; England
- Coordinates: 53.9633°N 2.0362°W

Information
- Type: Academy
- Local authority: North Yorkshire Council
- Trust: Moorlands Learning Trust UID:17292
- Department for Education URN: 141179 Tables
- Ofsted: Reports
- Principal: Richard McManus
- Gender: Coeducational
- Age: 11 to 16
- Enrolment: 293 as of December 2019
- Capacity: 835
- Website: www.theskiptonacademy.co.uk

The Skipton Academy (formerly Aireville School) is a small rural 11–16 coeducational secondary school located in Skipton, North Yorkshire, England.

Previously a community school administered by North Yorkshire County Council, Aireville School converted to academy status in September 2014 and was renamed The Skipton Academy.

== Description ==
The school has a comprehensive admissions policy, but the other two secondary schools in Skipton (Ermysted's Grammar School and Skipton Girls' High School) are both academically selective grammar schools. The school provides a curriculum that covers what pupils will need once they are in the world of work. It offers a wide range of extra-curricular and cultural activities, while enrichment activities include everything from a pantomime rewards trip to a Learn2Earn activity day.

The curriculum focuses on the core subjects of English, maths, RE and PE. All students must also choose to study French, geography or history. Other subjects are available, such as computer science, engineering, health and social care, drama and business studies.

== Site ==
Aireville Hall was the home of the Dewhirst family, who were silk and cotton manufacturers. The building dates from 1836.

== History ==
The first school was financed by Dewhurst and built next to the Congregational Church. It was one of the British Schools, as distinct from the Tory, established church National Schools. By 1909, the school had expanded and land was bought to by move the school, it became The Brougham Street Council School. With the Education Act 1944, secondary schools were needed for all children. Brougham Street Secondary Modern School was born, and much expanded in numbers, they used buildings all over the town. In 1958 it moved to the current site. The school now became Aireville Secondary Modern School and later Aireville County Secondary School.

The election of the Thatcher government halted the planned reorganisation of the three Skipton School into 11–16 comprehensive on the Aireville site and a sixth form college.

Over the next three decades the school had many successes with great curriculum achievements in Rural studies, a Brass Band and amazing drama productions. one of which went to the National Theatre in London. After two successful Ofsted inspections the school hit a difficult patch and in 2014, it became an academy as part of a political move to avoid the term 'secondary modern school'. In an Ofsted inspection in 2017, it was declared to be inadequate. Ofsted explained that over time, senior leaders have not leadership. Plans and strategies though made have been poorly implemented as have the review procedures. The governors have been complacent and not fulfilled their duties. "The quality of teaching is inadequate. Work is not planned well enough to challenge or excite pupils".

The current management team followed the advice it was given, and at the next inspection, Ofsted that this is an improving school that still requires improvement.

The school is improving under the leadership of the principal, but inconsistencies remain in the quality of teaching, in pupils’personal development and welfare, and in their outcomes

They add that staff morale is high, and

For the previous two years, pupils have madeprogress in their GCSEs across a wide range of subjects that is at least in line with the national average.Most current pupils in mathematics are making strong progress.

== See also ==
- Listed buildings in Skipton
