= Water Street Wesleyan Methodist Church =

Building in Skipton, North Yorkshire, England

Coordinates: 53°57′46″N 2°01′07″W

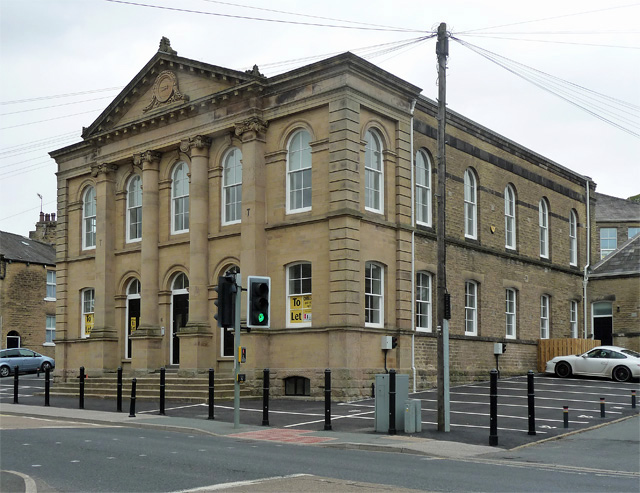
The church, in 2013

The Water Street Wesleyan Methodist Church is a closed church in Skipton, a town in North Yorkshire, in England.

The first Methodist church in Skipton is what is now The Old Chapel. By the 1860s the Wesleyan Methodist Church congregation had grown, and a larger building was needed. They initially planned to use a site in Wesley Place, but ultimately picked a location on Water Street. It was built between 1864 and 1865, at a cost of around £4,000, and an organ was installed in 1867. The church closed in 1952, the congregation moving to the Gargrave Road Methodist Church. The building was converted into offices for the Education Department of North Yorkshire County Council, which remained in the property until 2011, since when it has accommodated other businesses. The building has been grade II listed since 1978.

The former chapel is built of stone, with rusticated quoins, sill bands, a cornice and a central dentilled pediment. There are two storeys, the front has five bays, and contains giant Ionic columns and pilasters. The outer bays contain segmental-arched windows on the ground floor. The other openings, including the central doorway, have moulded round arches with imposts and keystones. Along the sides are six bays with segmental-arched windows on the ground floor and round-arched windows above.

== See also ==
- Listed buildings in Skipton
