= Brindley Mill =

Building in Skipton, North Yorkshire, England

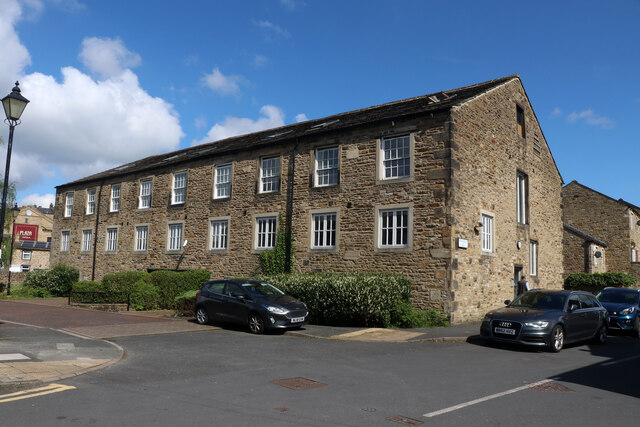
The building, in 2021

Brindley Mill is a historic building in Skipton, a town in North Yorkshire, in England.

Robert Fell worked as an innkeeper and lead merchant in Skipton in the 1820s. In 1835, he went into business with Forster Horner, and constructed the Craven Lead Works on Keighley Road in the town. The firm later became a plumbers' merchants, using the building as a warehouse. In 1977 it demolished its largest chimney, as it had become expensive to maintain. The company closed in 1998, then the ancillary buildings were demolished, and the mill was converted into 12 flats. The building has been grade II listed since 1978.

The building is constructed of stone, with quoins, and a stone flag roof. It has two storeys and is nine bays wide. At the rear is a tall tapering chimney. On the gable end facing the street is a former hoist and warehouse doors.

== See also ==
- Listed buildings in Skipton
