= Holy Trinity Church, Skipton =

Coordinates: 53.9633°N 2.0161°W

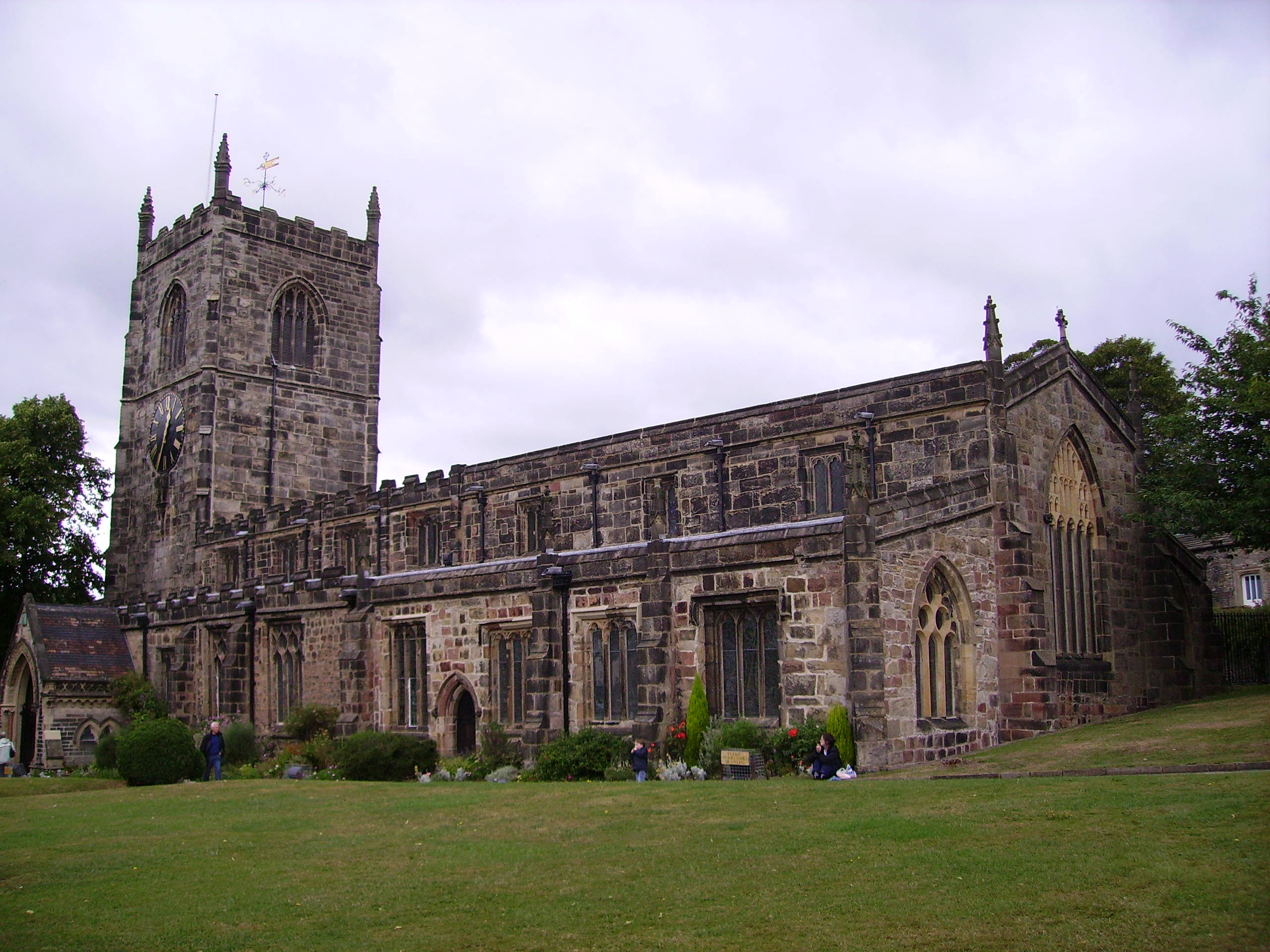
- Holy Trinity Church, Skipton, from the southeast

- Location in North Yorkshire
- OS grid reference: SD 990,519
- Location: High Street, Skipton, North Yorkshire
- Country: England
- Denomination: Anglican
- Website: Holy Trinity, Skipton

History
- Status: Parish church
- Founded: 12th century

Architecture
- Functional status: Active
- Heritage designation: Grade I
- Designated: 28 April 1952
- Architect(s): Austin and Paley (1909 and 1925)
- Architectural type: Church
- Style: Gothic
- Completed: 1909

Administration
- Province: York
- Diocese: Leeds
- Archdeaconry: Craven
- Deanery: Skipton
- Parish: Skipton

Clergy
- Rector: Reverend Canon Dr James Theodosius

Holy Trinity Church is in High Street, Skipton, North Yorkshire, England. Medieval in origin, the church is recorded in the National Heritage List for England as a designated Grade I listed building. The older active Anglican parish church in the town, it is located in the deanery of Skipton, the archdeaconry of Craven and the Diocese of Leeds. Its benefice is united with that of a church in a neighbouring village: St Augustine, Draughton.

== History ==
The first church on the site was built in the early 12th century, probably in wood. The present church dates from about 1300, and was extended to the east in the late 15th century. The church was damaged during the Civil War, and was repaired and restored in the 1650s with financial assistance from Lady Anne Clifford of Skipton Castle, whose father's tomb is in the church. In 1853 the tower was struck by lightning. The church was restored in 1909 by the Lancaster architects Austin and Paley. During this process, the galleries were removed, a north transept and new vestries were added, and new seating was installed. The church was struck by lightning again in 1925, causing a fire that destroyed the organ and damaged the roof. The roof was repaired, and a new organ case was installed, again by Austin and Paley. In 1979 the Lady Chapel was created in the southeast corner of the church, and more recently a Prayer Corner was developed in a corresponding position at the northeast of the church.

== Architecture ==
The plan of the church consists of a nave with a clerestory, a south porch, a north transept containing the organ and vestries, a chancel with the Lady Chapel to the south and the Prayer Corner to the north, and a west tower embraced by the nave. The window tracery is mainly in Perpendicular style, with some in Decorated style. The font stands at the west end of the nave, and has a Jacobean cover. The rood screen dates from 1533. In the chancel is a triple sedilia. There are monuments in the church dating from the 16th and 17th centuries to the memory of members of the Clifford family. One of the windows contains stained glass by Kempe. The original pipe organ was built in 1803 by Lincoln of London. It was sited in a gallery on the northeast of the church, and had been moved by 1855 to the southeast corner of the church. In 1875 a new organ was built by Jardine, and it was moved in 1888 to a new organ chamber on the northeast of the church by Abbott and Smith of Leeds. Following the destruction of this organ in 1925, a new three-manual organ, built by Rushworth and Dreaper of Liverpool and designed by Edward Bairstow, was installed. This organ was rebuilt and reduced to two manuals in two phases in 1966 and 1970, and moved into the left bay of the north transept by Laycock and Bannister of Keighley. There is a ring of eight bells, all cast by John Taylor & Co. of Loughborough in 1921.

== Clock ==
The original clock was replaced in 1835 by a new clock costing £160 (equivalent to £17,600 in 2025). This was replaced by Skipton Urban Council in 1899 by a clock built by Potts of Leeds.

== Burials ==
- Henry Clifford, 1st Earl of Cumberland
- George Clifford, 3rd Earl of Cumberland

== See also ==
- Grade I listed buildings in North Yorkshire (district)
- Listed buildings in Skipton
- List of ecclesiastical works by Austin and Paley (1895–1914)
- List of ecclesiastical works by Austin and Paley (1916–44)
