= Listed buildings in Skipton =

Skipton is a civil parish in the county of North Yorkshire, England. It contains 110 listed buildings that are recorded in the National Heritage List for England. Of these, four are listed at Grade I, the highest of the three grades, two are at Grade II*, the middle grade, and the others are at Grade II, the lowest grade. The parish contains the market town of Skipton and the surrounding countryside. The most important buildings in the parish are Skipton Castle and Holy Trinity Church, which are listed, together with associated structures. Most of the other listed buildings are houses, cottages and associated structures, shops and offices, and the rest include hotels and public houses, other churches and chapels, public buildings, banks, bridges, farmhouses, mills and warehouses, a former lead works, schools and schoolmasters' houses, a former toll house, a former workhouse, boundary stones, a railway station, a former theatre, a statue, a war memorial and two telephone kiosks.

== Key ==
Grade	Criteria
I	Buildings of exceptional interest, sometimes considered to be internationally important
II*	Particularly important buildings of more than special interest
II	Buildings of national importance and special interest

== Buildings ==
Name and location	Photograph	Date	Notes	Grade
Skipton Castle; 53.96409°N 2.01521°W		Early 14th century	The castle is in limestone, and is partly occupied. The entrance in the unoccupied part is flanked by massive round towers, and it leads to the Conduit Court, which contains a well, and is surrounded by two and three-storey buildings, and a watch tower. The east wing is occupied, and its features include two two-storey polygonal bay windows, and at the east end is a large polygonal tower. It has a Tudor doorway, and the windows are mullioned and transomed.	I
Former chapel, Skipton Castle; 53.96387°N 2.01617°W		Early 14th century	The chapel, now ruined, is in stone and has a rectangular plan. It contains windows with Decorated tracery, round-arched doorways and smaller windows.	I
Outer Gatehouse, Skipton Castle; 53.96345°N 2.01548°W		Early 14th century	The gatehouse is in stone, and consists of two massive towers with embattled parapets, and a round stair turret. The entrance between the towers has a four-centred arch, above which is a string course and a stone plaque with a carved coat of arms. Over this are two tall windows, a string course and a parapet containing a motto in openwork lettering. Inside the right tower is a room with a grotto in shell-work.	I
Holy Trinity Church; 53.96331°N 2.01617°W		14th century	The church has been altered and extended through the centuries, including alterations in the early 20th century by Austin and Paley. It is built in stone, and consists of a nave with a clerestory, north and south aisles, a south porch, a chancel with a clerestory, aisles, chapels and vestries, and a west tower embraced by the aisles. The tower has two stages, diagonal buttresses, a five-light west window with a hood mould, a clock face, five-light bell openings with hood moulds, and an embattled parapet with crocketed corner pinnacles. There are also embattled parapets on the south wall of the nave and the south aisle.	I
Boundary walls, Skipton Castle; 53.96347°N 2.01453°W		Medieval	The walls enclose the grounds of the castle on the southern and eastern boundaries. They are in stone, and about 10 feet (3.0 m) in height with flat capping.	II
58A High Street; 53.96160°N 2.01754°W	—	Late Medieval	A row of three stone cottages in stone, later used for other purposes. The nearest one to the street has two storeys, it is in Gothic style, and has two doorways with pointed arches and mullioned windows on the upper floor. The middle cottage is late medieval with a Tudor arched doorway and mullioned windows. To the west is a cottage with a blocked doorway and sash windows.	II
Red Lion Inn and rear yard 53.96203°N 2.01625°W		Before 17th century	A hall house, later an inn, in gritstone with sandstone dressings and a stone flag roof. There are two storeys and a C-shaped plan, with a front range and two rear wings. The front range has five bays, the left two bays higher and with paired eaves corbels and windows with wedge lintels. The right three bays contain a doorway with three-light mullioned windows to the left and single-light windows to the right. The rear wings are gabled, and have quoins. In the yard are granite setts and river cobbles, and a well with a circular head.	II
Cock and Bottle Public House; 53.96022°N 2.01898°W		17th century	The public house, which was remodelled in the 19th century, is in painted stone with a stone flag roof. There are three low storeys and two bays. The ground floor contains a doorway and casement windows, and on the middle floor are two oriel windows with chamfered mullions and a cornice on concave-arched brackets. The top floor is gabled and contains three-light mullioned windows, the middle lights higher and arched. At the rear is a long two-storey wing with sash windows.	II
Packhorse bridge 53.96103°N 2.01018°W		17th century (probable)	The bridge, which is in stone, crosses Wilderness Beck. It consists of a low single span, it has large flag paving, and one low parapet.	II
Range to northwest of Outer Gatehouse, Skipton Castle; 53.96360°N 2.01579°W		Mid-17th century (probable)	A long range of stone buildings with a stone flag roof, used for various purposes. The range has buttresses, and mullioned windows with pointed lights.	II
The Old Grammar School; 53.96112°N 2.01049°W		17th century	The rebuilding of an older chapel, subsequently used as a grammar school, and later a private house. It is in stone, with two storeys. On the front is a two-storey gabled porch with quoins, containing an arched entrance. The windows on the front have plain surrounds and are mullioned, and at the rear are windows with round-arched lights.	II
3 Mill Bridge; 53.96314°N 2.01697°W	—	1675	A cottage that has been altered and later used for other purposes, it is in painted and rendered stone, with quoins, and a stone flag roof, and is in two and three storeys. The north front contains a doorway and various windows. On the south front is a doorway with a chamfered surround and a basket arch, and a doorhead containing three recessed plaques with the date and initials. The windows vary, and include a mullioned window and a horizontally sliding sash window.	II
3, 5 and 7 Victoria Square; 53.96089°N 2.01790°W		1675	A row of three shops in stone, with a stone flag roof, stone copings and kneelers. There are three storeys, on the ground floor are three shopfronts of different periods, and above are irregularly spaced sash windows. On the gable end is a re-used datestone, mullioned widows and a blocked doorway.	II
The Black Horse Public House; 53.96258°N 2.01678°W		1676	The public house is in stuccoed stone, and has three storeys and three bays. On the front are two bay windows flanking a doorway. To the left is a segmental arch leading to the yard, with a smaller arch and a mounting block. The upper floors have sash windows and a datestone.	II
Friends Meeting House; 53.95998°N 2.01490°W		1693	The building has a low single storey, it is in stone, and has a stone slate roof with copings and springers. There is a central doorway with a dated lintel and two windows.	II
High Skibeden Farmhouse; 53.97092°N 1.97084°W	—	Early 18th century	The farmhouse is in stuccoed stone, with stone flag roofs, and two storeys. In the centre is a doorway with Tuscan engaged columns and a pediment, and the windows are modern in plain architraves. Attached is a lower part with very thick walls, containing a French window and mullioned windows. At the rear is a round-headed stair window.	II
1 High Street; 53.96299°N 2.01542°W		18th century	A house, later used for other purposes, in roughcast stone with a slate roof. There are two low storeys and four bays. On the front is a doorway, to its left is a former doorway converted into a window, with a round arch, imposts and a keystone. The other windows are sashes, and in front of the building is a mounting block.	II
31 and 33 High Street; 53.96184°N 2.01636°W		18th century	The shop is in painted brick, and has quoins and an eaves cornice on blocks. There are three storeys and three bays. The ground floor contains modern shopfronts.	II
35, 37. 39 and 41 High Street; 53.96167°N 2.01645°W		18th century	A row of shops in stone with a slate roof and three storeys. The left two shops have two bays, and a moulded cornice on moulded blocks. The ground floor contains modern shopfronts. On the middle floor are two tripartite windows with cornices. The inner pilaster of each window rises as a moulded architrave forming an arch with triple keystone. The top floor windows are sash windows with plain surrounds. The shops on the right have three gabled bays, and contain modern shopfronts and tripartite mullioned windows, those on the top floor stepped. In the rear yard is a segmental arch.	II
60A High Street; 53.96158°N 2.01723°W	—	Mid-18th century	The building is in stone, and has two storeys and square-section stone mullioned windows.	II
12 Sheep Street; 53.96113°N 2.01736°W		18th century	The shop is in stone, with rusticated quoins on the left, eaves modillions, and a coped gable on the left with a springer. There are three storeys and one bay, with a narrow bay on the left return. The ground floor contains an early 20th-century shopfront, canted on the corner, with pilasters, a fascia and a cornice, and colonnettes to the glazing. On the upper floors are tripartite sash windows.	II
14 and 16 Sheep Street; 53.96106°N 2.01739°W		18th century	The building is in stone, with three storeys and three bays, The ground floor contains a modern shopfront, and to the right is a passage entrance. On the upper floors are sash windows with wedge lintels.	II
18 Sheep Street; 53.96099°N 2.01740°W		18th century	The shop is in painted stone with a slate roof. There are three low storeys and two bays. The ground floor contains a modern shopfront, and on the upper floors are sash windows in stone architraves.	II
26 and 28 Sheep Street; 53.96074°N 2.01747°W	—	18th century	The shop is in stone, it has stone brackets to the eaves, and a slate roof with stone copings. There are three storeys and two bays. On the ground floor is a modern shopfront, and the upper floors have sash windows.	II
30 Sheep Street; 53.96072°N 2.01749°W		18th century	The shop is in stone, and has a slate roof with stone copings and kneelers. There are three storeys and two bays. The ground floor contains a modern shopfront and a passage entry to the right, and on the upper floors are sash windows with plain surrounds.	II
18 and 18A Swadford Street; 53.96031°N 2.01853°W		18th century	A house, later two shops, in stone, with rusticated quoins, and modillion eaves. There are three storeys and five bays, the middle bay projecting slightly. The ground floor projects further, and contains modern shopfronts. On the upper floors are windows with moulded architraves.	II
1 The Bailey; 53.96307°N 2.01534°W		18th century	A house, probably originating as a coach house, it is roughcast, and has a slate roof, hipped on the left. There are two storeys and two bays. The left bay contains a wide segmental arch filled with a shallow bay window. To its right is an inserted doorway, and the upper floor has square nine-pane windows.	II
Bridge House; 53.96396°N 2.01798°W		18th century	The house, later used for other purposes, is in stone and has a slate roof with stone copings and kneelers. There are two storeys and three bays. The central doorway has a moulded architrave, and above it is a single-light window. The other bays contain a three-light window in each floor.	II
Cross Keys Garage; 53.96111°N 2.01085°W		18th century	Formerly a private house, the building is in painted stone with quoins on the left. There are two storeys, and on the front are a doorway and various windows.	II
Devonshire Hotel; 53.96030°N 2.01565°W		18th century	The building is in stone, painted at the rear, with rusticated quoins, a moulded string course, and a massive eaves cornice. There are three storeys and five bays, the middle three bays projecting under a pediment. Steps lead up to the central doorway that has a moulded architrave and a pediment. The windows are sashes with stone surrounds.	II*
Former Hole i' th' Wall public house with shop 53.96106°N 2.01658°W		18th century	The public house, later a shop, is in stone, with three storeys and four bays. The ground floor has an arcade of six round arches, the left a doorway, the right a passage entry, and the others containing windows. On the upper floor are sash windows in stone surrounds, paired in the second bay.	II
Outbuildings, Red Lion Inn; 53.96208°N 2.01571°W	—	18th century	The outbuildings originally served a farmhouse, then an inn, and are in buff sandstone, partly painted, with stone slate roofs. They form an L-shaped plan, and consist of a long barn aligned north-south, a short barn aligned east-west to the west of this, and a western lean-to connecting to an outshut of the inn.	II
Gateway east of Skipton Castle; 53.96401°N 2.01398°W	—	18th century	The gateway adjoining the southeast corner of the east tower is flanked by two stone piers with ball finials.	II
High Corn Mill; 53.96380°N 2.01732°W		18th century (probable)	The mill consists of two stone buildings straddling Eller Brook over a single span arch. There are three storeys and an L-shaped plan.	II
Low Skibeden Farmhouse; 53.96902°N 1.98190°W		18th century	The farmhouse is in stone, and has a slate roof with stone copings and springers. There are two storeys and three bays. The doorway is in the centre, and the windows on the front are sashes in plain architraves. On the right gable end is a round-arched stair window with Gothic glazing and a doorway.	II
The Tolbooth; 53.96120°N 2.01698°W		18th century	A row of shops in stone, with quoins, a floor band, pilasters between the upper floor bays with moulded bases and vertically fluted caps, an ornamental entablature at the eaves, paterae, and a roof with gable copings and springers. There are two storeys and five bays. On the ground floor is an arcade of five round arches with moulded archivolts on pilasters, containing doorways and windows. The upper floor has long windows with plain surrounds.	II
38 High Street; 53.96217°N 2.01687°W		1760	Originally a town house with a wool warehouse at the rear, later a shop and offices. It is in buff sandstone with slate roofs, and some red brick in the rear wing. At the front are three storeys and three bays, flanking giant pilasters, a floor band, and a moulded] cornice. The ground floor contains an early 20th-century shopfront and a passage entry to the left. The outer shop windows are curved, the doorway is between them, and the entrance to the shop and passage have mosaic flooring. On the upper floor are sash windows, three on the middle floor and two on the top floor.	II
New Bridge; 53.96120°N 2.01947°W		After 1773	The bridge carries Coach Street over Springs Bank Canal. It consists of a single arch of rusticated stone with voussoirs and an arched parapet. Stone steps lead down to the towpath on the southwest side.	II
2 Cross Street; 53.95842°N 2.01877°W	—	Late 18th century (probable)	A warehouse on the bank of the Leeds and Liverpool Canal, it is in roughcast stone, with quoins, and a stone flag roof. It is in two and three storeys. On the towpath front is a large round-arched sash window, and small-paned sashes.	II
62–66 High Street; 53.96158°N 2.01723°W		Late 18th century (probable)	Two stone shops at the end of a row. The end shop has three storeys and fronts of two bays. There are end pilasters, and the upper floor contains sash windows. On the ground floor is a shopfront with fluted pilasters, colonnettes and spandrels to the glazing, a fascia and a dentilled cornice. Above it is a large shop window with pilasters, a fascia and a cornice, over which is a clock. The smaller shop to the south has two storeys, one bay, and a similar shopfront, above which is a canted oriel window.	II
6 Mill Bridge; 53.96357°N 2.01706°W		Late 18th century	At one time an inn and later used for other purposes, the building is stuccoed and has a Welsh slate roof. There are two storeys and two bays. The doorway is in the centre, and the windows are sashes.	II
23 Newmarket Street; 53.96069°N 2.01520°W		Late 18th century	The building is in stone, the left side rendered, with quoins and a stone flag roof. There are two storeys and two bays. Three steps lead up to the central doorway with a plain surround. The windows are sashes in plain architraves.	II
10 Sheep Street; 53.96122°N 2.01729°W		Late 18th century	Two shops, later combined into one, in painted rendered stone, with rusticated quoins, bracketed eaves, and a slate roof. There are three storeys and two bays. The left shop has a former segmental carriage arch with a keystone infilled with a 19th-century shopfront. The right shop has a 19th-century shopfront with pilasters. The upper floors contain tripartite sash windows.	II
Tarn Moor Bridge; 53.97787°N 2.01747°W		Late 18th century	The bridge carries Brakenley Lane over Eller Beck. It is in stone, and consists of a single round arch with voussoirs. The bridge has a string course at the base of the parapet.	II
The Barge Inn; 53.96059°N 2.01985°W		Late 18th century	A warehouse converted into a public house, it is in stone, with quoins, and a stone flag roof with stone copings and kneelers. There are three storeys and three bays. In the centre is a modern projection in painted brick and glass, and the outer bays contain three-light mullioned windows.	II
The Dales Outdoor Centre; 53.96036°N 2.01978°W		Late 18th century	A warehouse, later used for other purposes, it is in stone, with quoins and a stone flag roof. There are two storeys and three bays. In the centre, a segmental arch has been extended to the full height of the building, and glazed. Some windows are mullioned, there is one casement window, and the rest are modern. On the front of the building is a hoist.	II
Bridge over Springs Canal; 53.96337°N 2.01717°W		c. 1780	The bridge carries a road over a canal. It is in stone, and consists of a single segmental arch with voussoirs.	II
Building south of 4 Court Lane; 53.96124°N 2.01520°W		c. 1800	A pair of houses in stone, with three storeys and three bays. On the front are two doorways with architraves, divided fanlights and hoods on brackets. Above them is a fixed-light window, and the outer bays contain sash windows. To the south is a lower building in stone with a stone flag roof. It contains a segmental-arched opening, and a stable entry with a loft above, partly blocked.	II
4 and 6 High Street; 53.96299°N 2.01671°W		c. 1800	The building is in stone, with three storeys and three bays. The ground floor has a central doorway, and flanking shop windows with round-headed lights. The upper floors contain sash windows in stone architraves. At the rear is a round-arched stair window with Gothic glazing.	II
34 and 36 High Street; 53.96221°N 2.01686°W		c. 1800	A shop in stone, with quoins, four storeys and three bays. The ground floor contains a shopfront with a fascia and a dentilled cornice. In the middle of the first floor is a Venetian window, flanked by windows. The second floor has sash windows, and on the top floor are casement windows, all in architraves.	II
1–11, 6 and 8 Watsons Houses; 53.96125°N 2.01886°W		c. 1800	A group of cottages in stone, with stone flag roofs and two storeys. Each cottage has a doorway, and a sash window in an architrave in both floors.	II
Royal Shepherd Public House; 53.96130°N 2.01898°W		c. 1800	The public house is in stone, with the gable end facing the street. There are two storeys and an attic, and a front of three bays. The doorway has a plain surround and a rectangular fanlight, and the windows are sashes, the window in the attic with two lights.	II
Former coach house, Skipton Castle; 53.96408°N 2.01611°W		c. 1800	The building is in stone, and has a long rectangular plan. The openings include mullioned windows, a small Gothic ogee-headed window, and a Gothic doorway framed in banded masonry. External steps lead up to the loft.	II
Warehouse north of 2 Court Lane; 53.96134°N 2.01517°W		18th to 19th century	The warehouse, later used for other purposes, is in stone with quoins, three storeys and four bays, and a lean-to at the end. On the front is a doorway with a divided fanlight, above which is a re-set datestone of 1674. Most of the windows are multi-paned, and on the right return are two segmental-headed windows.	II
58 High Street; 53.96158°N 2.01710°W		18th to 19th century	The shop is in stone, with rusticated quoins, and moulded string courses. There are three storeys and four bays. The ground floor contains a modern shopfront, and to its left is a passage entrance over which is a pediment. On the upper floors are sash windows with plain surrounds.	II
60 High Street and 2 Sheep Street; 53.96158°N 2.01710°W	—	18th to 19th century	Two shops in stone, with rusticated quoins, three storeys and five bays. The ground floor contains modern shopfronts, and between them is a round-arched passage entrance with a moulded archivolt and a triple keystone.	II
Former stables behind 22 Newmarket Street; 53.96020°N 2.01526°W	—	18th to 19th century	The building is in stone with a hipped slate roof. There are two storeys, and on the part nearer the street are a doorway with a moulded surround and a cornice, and a sash window. To the rear are three round-arched coach entrances, a segmental-arched carriage entry and sash windows.	II
20–24 Sheep Street; 53.96082°N 2.01744°W		18th to 19th century	A row of three shops in stone, with quoins, and gable copings with springers. There are three storeys and seven bays. The right bay contains a late 19th-century shopfront with pilasters, fluted brackets, and a moulded dentilled and modillion cornice. The glazing has Composite colonnettes and ornamental spandrels. To the left is a segmental-arched passage entry, and further to the left are two modern shopfronts. The upper floors have windows with stone surrounds, some with fixed lights. At the rear are three 17th-century mullioned windows.	II
Springfield; 53.96208°N 2.00968°W		c. 1825	The house is in stone, with quoins and a sill band. There are two storeys and three bays. The central doorway has pilasters and a cornice. It is flanked by canted bay windows, and the other windows are sashes.	II
2 Chapel Hill; 53.96374°N 2.01759°W	—	Early 19th century	The house is in stone, and has three storeys and two bays. The doorway is on the left bay, and has a fanlight and a cornice. The windows are sashes, those on the lower two floors with wedge lintels.	II
3 High Street; 53.96286°N 2.01556°W		Early 19th century	A house, later used for other purposes, in stone, with rusticated quoins, eaves modillions, and a hipped roof. Thee are two storeys and three bays. The central doorway has triple-clustered columns with capitals and bases, a radial fanlight, and an open pediment, and above it is a sash window. The outer bays contain two-storey canted bay windows.	II
20 Swadford Street; 53.96030°N 2.01871°W		Early 19th century	The shop is in stone with a cornice. There are three storeys and three bays. The ground floor projects and contains a modern shopfront. On the upper floors are sash windows.	II
Brindley Mill; 53.95783°N 2.01820°W		Early 19th century (probable)	Originally Craven Lead Works, later converted for residential use, the building is in stone, with quoins, and a stone flag roof. There are two storeys and nine bays, and at the rear is a tall tapering chimney. On the gable end facing the street is a former hoist and warehouse doors.	II
Castle Inn; 53.96340°N 2.01679°W		Early 19th century	The public house is in stone, with eaves modillions and a slate roof. There are three storeys and three bays. The central doorway has a round-arched head, a semicircular fanlight with Gothic glazing, and a pediment on simple consoles. The windows are sashes, and at the rear is a round-arched stair window. Recessed to the right is the former stable wing, lower, whitewashed, and with two storeys. It contains a barn door, a doorway with a fanlight and a modern window, and on the upper floor are two sash windows and a loft door.	II
Cross Keys Hotel; 53.96112°N 2.01067°W		Early 19th century	Originally a headmaster's house, later a hotel, it is in stone with a heavy eaves cornice. There are two storeys and three bays. The central doorway has a moulded architrave, a semicircular fanlight with a keystone, and a cornice on consoles. The ground floor contains three light windows, above the doorway is a round-arched window with imposts and a keystone, and on the outer bays are Venetian windows with keystones.	II
Former coach house west of Cross Keys Garage; 53.96110°N 2.01147°W		Early 19th century (probable)	The coach house, later converted for residential use, is in stone, with quoins, and a stone slate roof with copings and kneelers. There are two storeys and three bays. In the centre is a wide segmental arch, and elsewhere are inserted openings.	II
Old Toll House; 53.95906°N 2.00515°W		Early 19th century	The former toll house is in stone with hipped slate roof. There is a single storey, three bays, and a projecting wing on the right with a curved end facing the road. In the centre is a round-arched doorway with a semicircular fanlight, flanked by flat topped sash windows. On the wing is a round-arched doorway converted into a window, and, facing the road, is a round-arched window.	II
Former Royal Oak Public House; 53.96342°N 2.01795°W		Early 19th century	The public house, on a corner site, is in stone, and has two storeys, a basement and attics. The gabled front on Raikes Road has three bays, and a central doorway approached by steps bridging the basement area, and has a round head, engaged Tuscan columns, and an entablature. The attic has a round-headed window, and the other windows are sashes. On the Water Street front are three bays, a doorway approached by steps, pilasters and an entablature, and the windows are sashes.	II
Former stables building, Skipton Castle; 53.96396°N 2.01591°W		Early 19th century (probable)	The stable building is in stone, with a square plan and two storeys. On the south front is a large pointed-arched entrance, and on the west end is a sash window on each floor.	II
The Chapel; 53.96434°N 2.01765°W		Early 19th century	The chapel, which has been converted for residential use, is in stone and has two storeys. The entrance front has three bays, a string course, a frieze, a cornice, and a dentilled pediment. The outer bays each contains a doorway with panelled jambs, a semicircular fanlight, a lintel and a cornice, and between them is a flat-headed window. On the upper floor, and along the sides, are round-arched windows.	II
1–11 Craven Terrace; 53.96121°N 2.01808°W		Early to mid-19th century	A row of eleven cottages in stone with a slate roof. There are two storeys, and each house has a doorway with a plain surround and a cornice. Most of the windows are sashes in architraves, and at the rear are round-headed stair windows.	II
Former fire station 53.96149°N 2.01992°W		1835	Originally a chapel, later a fire station, and subsequently used for other purposes, it is in stone with a floor band. There are two storeys, a front of five bays, the right three bays projecting, and the left corner curved. The doorway on the front has an arched head, imposts and a keystone. To the right is an altered doorway, and on the curved corner is a doorway with a plain surround and a hood. The windows have round arches with radiating glazing bars.	II
Former Aireville Hall, Aireville School; 53.96285°N 2.03660°W		1836	Originally a private house, later incorporated into a school, it is in stone with two storeys. On the front are gables, one with a coat of arms, and another with the date. The porch has a four-centred arch and octagonal turrets. On the garden front is a shallow two-storey bay window, and the other windows are mullioned and transomed cross windows. Attached to the house is a four-centred arch linking with a two-storey stable block.	II
Christ Church; 53.95810°N 2.01947°W		1836–38	The church, designed by R. D. Chantrell, is in sandstone and freestone with a slate roof. It consists of a nave with a clerestory, north and south aisles, a chancel with a clerestory, aisles and a crypt, and a west tower. The tower has two stages, diagonal buttresses rising to corner pinnacles, and an open arcaded parapet. On the west side is a doorway with a pointed arch, above it is a large three-light window, and the bell openings have two lights and louvres.	II*
St Stephen's Church; 53.96359°N 2.02071°W		1836–38	The Catholic church is in sandstone, and has a rectangular plan. It is without aisles, and has a southeast baptistry and a west porch. The church is in Early English style, with lancet windows.	II
17–19 High Street and Town Hall; 53.96242°N 2.01596°W		1837–39	A pair of houses, with the town hall added in 1861–62, and the houses later converted for other uses. The buildings are in sandstone and gritstone with stone slate roofs. The houses, to the left, have three storeys and five bays. In the centre is a doorway with pilasters and an entablature, and the windows are sashes. The town hall has two high storeys, a three-bay full-height central portico flanked by two bays on each side, and a balustraded parapet. The portico has three round-arched doorways, above which is a balustraded balcony with four Composite columns, an entablature and a pediment. The windows are sashes, those on the upper floor with segmental pediments.	II
Administration Block, Raikeswood Hospital; 53.96340°N 2.02448°W		1839–40	Originally a workhouse designed by George Webster, it was later converted for residential use. It is in stone with a slate roof. The central block has three storeys and a sill band, and seven bays, the middle three bays projecting under a pediment. This is flanked by wings with two storeys and five bays, and end gabled pavilions with two storeys and two bays. The central doorway has a round-arched head and a pediment, and is flanked by round-headed windows, and the other windows are sashes with flat heads.	II
Nurses Home, Raikeswood Hospital; 53.96402°N 2.02484°W		c. 1840	The building is in stone with a slate roof. There are two storeys and five bays, the middle bay projecting under a pediment. In the centre is a round-arched doorway with a semicircular fanlight and a cornice, and above it is a round-arched sash window with a hood mould and keystone. The other windows are tall sashes.	II
Electricity Sub-Station; 53.96104°N 2.01038°W		1841	Originally a schoolroom for the grammar school and later used for other purposes, it is in stone, with quoins, and a stone flag roof with moulded coping, springers and finials. There is a single storey and a rectangular plan, the gabled front faces the road, and along the sides are four bays. On the centre of the gabled front is a mullioned and transomed three-light stepped window, to its left is a doorway, and on the gable apex is a small triangular-headed window. Along the sides are cross windows.	II
Victoria Mill and chimney 53.96082°N 2.02171°W		1847	A steam powered mill that was converted into residential accommodation in 1990, it is in stone with quoins and a slate roof. It consists of two parallel four-bay ranges with an H-shaped roof, and a main block of five storeys and an attic and seven bays. The ranges have coped gables, raised in the centre and containing chimneys. To the west is a detached octagonal chimney on a square base, rising higher than the mill.	II
Former Barclays Bank; 53.96130°N 2.01655°W		1849	The bank building is in stone with a top cornice. There are three storeys and six bays, the right two bays projecting slightly. The ground floor is rusticated, and contains an arcade of round-arched doorways and windows. On the upper floors are giant Ionic pilasters, and sash windows, those on the middle floor with panelled aprons.	II
51 High Street; 53.96119°N 2.01657°W	—	19th century	The building is in stone, with three storeys and one bay. The ground floor, which has been altered, has a heavy cornice on fluted and dentilled brackets. On the upper floors are tripartite sash windows with mullions, that on the middle floor with a cornice, and on the top floor with a sill band.	II
1–15 and 2–16 King's Street and 5 and 7 Otley Road; 53.96217°N 2.00726°W		Mid-19th century	Two terraces of cottages in stone, with eaves on blocks, and slate roofs. There are two storeys, and each cottage has a doorway and a window in each floor; the windows are a mix of sashes and casements. On each house in Otley Road is a moulded inscribed panel.	II
4 Mill Bridge and Mill Bridge House; 53.96344°N 2.01697°W		19th century	The house is in stone, with a sill band, three storeys and a basement, and three bays. The doorway in the centre of the front is approached by steps with iron railings, and has a moulded architrave, a rectangular fanlight, a frieze with vertical fluting, and a cornice. The ground floor windows are set in recessed round arches. The doorway to No. 4. is on the right return.	II
25 Newmarket Street; 53.96071°N 2.01507°W		19th century	The building is in stone, with a sill band and a heavy eaves cornice. There are two storeys and three bays. The central doorway has Ionic columns and a dentilled cornice. The outer bays contain two-light windows, and all the ground floor openings are in recessed round arches with a patera in the tympanum. On the upper floor are sash windows.	II
1–15 and 2–16 Queen's Street and 9 Otley Road; 53.96221°N 2.00678°W		Mid-19th century	Two terraces of cottages in stone, with eaves on blocks, and slate roofs. There are two storeys, and each cottage has a doorway in a recessed segmental arch, and a window in each floor; the windows are a mix of sashes and casements. On each side is a moulded inscribed panel.	II
Craven Hotel; 53.95802°N 2.02078°W		Mid-19th century	The hotel is in painted stone, with a moulded string course and a hipped slate roof. There are two storeys, a square plan, and fronts of three bays. In the centre is a doorway with attached Tuscan columns, a frieze and a cornice. The windows are sashes in moulded architraves, the window above the doorway with a dentilled cornice on brackets. The left return is similar, the doorway converted into a window with Tuscan pilasters.	II
Eller Beck Bridge; 53.96352°N 2.01754°W		19th century	The bridge carries a road over Eller Beck. It is in stone, and consists of a single segmental arch of voussoirs with a rock-cut keystone.	II
St Stephen's School and schoolhouse 53.96231°N 2.02094°W		1854	The school and house are in stone with slate roofs, and both have two storeys. The school has five bays, the second and fourth gabled. In the centre is a gabled porch and a doorway with a pointed arch, flanked by three-light windows with pointed cusped heads. The upper floor windows have two taller lights in the gabled bays, and the others have three lights, all with cusped heads. The house to the left is much lower, with two bays. The doorway on the right bay has a fanlight and a cornice, and the windows each has a single light.	II
Former County Court and railings 53.96145°N 2.01478°W		1856–57	The court building, later used for other purposes, was designed by Charles Reeves, and is in sandstone, with rusticated quoins, and hipped Welsh slate roofs. It consists of a single-storey block with an L-shaped plan, wrapped round a main two-storey block with extensions. The single storey block has pilasters, an eaves cornice, and segmental-headed windows. The main doorway is on the corner and has a segmental arch, a fanlight and a keystone, above which are painted Royal Arms, and on the south front is a similar doorway. The main block contains two-light mullioned sash windows. Surrounding the building are cast iron railings on a chamfered plinth and an entrance gate.	II
St Monica's Convent; 53.96373°N 2.02034°W		1861	The building is in stone with a slate roof. There are two storeys and seven bays, the outer bays gabled, and the middle bay projecting and gabled. The middle bay contains a doorway with a pointed arch, above which is a four-light window, and a statue in a niche. The windows are lancets, mostly in pairs, and on the roof is a bell turret.	II
Former Wesleyan chapel 53.96278°N 2.01860°W		1864	The former chapel is in stone, with rusticated quoins, sill bands, a cornice and a central dentilled pediment. There are two storeys, the front has five bays, and contains giant Ionic columns and pilasters. The outer bays contain segmental-arched windows on the ground floor. The other openings, including the central doorway, have moulded round arches with imposts and keystones. Along the sides are six bays with segmental-arched windows on the ground floor and round-arched windows above.	II
Union Mills; 53.95638°N 2.01685°W		1867	A textile mill that has been extended, and subsequently converted for residential use. It is in stone with roofs of Welsh slate and glass. There were the original weaving sheds and warehouse to the north, with the engine house, boiler house and chimney at the south-east corner. Weaving sheds and warehouse were later added to the south. The main building has three storeys and 13 bays.	II
Dewhurst's Mill; 53.95965°N 2.02403°W		1867–70	A textile mill with three buildings, in stone with hipped roofs in slate and glazing. The main block has five storeys and 20 bays, with rusticated quoins, dentilled sill bands and casement windows. The east range has a U-shaped plan, with five storeys and ranges of ten and 15 bays, and the third building has four storeys and seven bays. At the rear is a chimney, and there are two water towers, the larger with a hipped roof, an iron belvedere and a bracketed cornice.	II
Boarding house, Ermysted's Grammar School; 53.96303°N 2.02226°W		1875	This was built as a grammar school designed by Paley and Austin, and later used as a boarding house. It is in stone, and in Tudor style. There are three storeys and the outer bays are gabled. It contains mullioned and transomed cross windows, those on the ground floor with four-centred arched heads, and those above with flat heads. The building also has string courses, and five gabled half-dormers. The left wing projects, and contains an entrance with a pointed arch and a moulded surround, above which is the date and an oriel window, and on the right bay is a bay window.	II
Boundary stone, Grassington Road; 53.97945°N 2.02910°W		Late 19th century	The boundary stone is on the northeast of the Grassington Road (B6265 road). It is in painted millstone grit, about 75 centimetres (30 in) in height, and has a basket-arched top. The stone is divided by a vertical groove with an inscription on each side.	II
Boundary stone, Gargrave Road; 53.96517°N 2.03895°W		Late 19th century	The boundary stone is on the northeast of the Grassington Road (B6265 road). It is in painted millstone grit, about 75 centimetres (30 in) in height, and has a basket-arched top. The stone is divided by a vertical groove with an inscription on each side.	II
Former Midland Hotel; 53.95934°N 2.02572°W		Late 19th century	Originally a railway hotel, it is in stone with sill bands, moulded wooden eaves with cresting and brackets, and a slate roof. There are three storeys and five bays. The ground floor contains two rectangular bay windows, over which is a cornice forming a verandah on two iron columns with pierced iron spandrels. On the upper floors are sash windows, and the entrance porch is on the left side.	II
Skipton railway station 53.95857°N 2.02618°W		1876	The railway station was designed by Charles Trubshaw for the Midland Railway. The station building is in stone with hipped slate roofs. There is an irregular front, the left part with one storey and the right part with two. The entrance projects and contains two round arches, cross windows, and a projecting chimney stack on corbels, with a panel containing a carving in relief. The right part includes a two-storey canted bay window. The south platform has a glazed canopy with 13 bays on 14 iron columns.	II
Canopy, Skipton railway station 53.95842°N 2.02656°W		1876	The canopy on the station platform was designed by Charles Trubshaw for the Midland Railway, and is in cast iron with glazed hipped roofs. There are five bays, and the canopy is carried on twelve columns with capitals and ornate brackets, and on the roof are iron finials.	II
Statue of Sir Mathew Wilson; 53.96237°N 2.01656°W		1885–86	The statue commemorates Sir Mathew Wilson, the first Member of Parliament for Skipton. The statue is in stone by Albert Bruce-Joy, and depicts a standing figure. It stands on a square sandstone plinth with a moulded base and cornice.	II
Former Midland Bank; 53.96078°N 2.01667°W		1888	The bank is in stone on the front and sides, and in red brick at the rear, with sill bands, a top frieze with swags, a cornice, and a balustraded parapet with a central pediment containing the date and a swag in the tympanum. There are three storeys and seven bays. The outer bays of the ground floor contain round-arched doorways with fluted pilasters, a keystone and an open pediment, and between them are windows divided by banded pilasters. On the upper floors are sash windows, those on the middle floor with moulded architraves and alternating triangular and segmental pediments, and those on the top floor with moulded cases.	II
St Andrew's Church; 53.96107°N 2.01416°W		1914–16	The church is in sandstone and limestone, with slate roofs, and is in Art Nouveau and Arts and Crafts styles. It has a cruciform plan, with semi-octagonal half-turrets, a sanctuary, a porch and a vestry. The entrance front facing the road has a decorated gable flanked by buttresses with carvings at the top. It contains a double doorway under a decorated segmental arch, above which is a large window with a pointed arch.	II
War memorial 53.96280°N 2.01617°W		1922	The war memorial in High Street was designed by J. Henry Sellers, with two statues by John Cassidy. It is in Portland stone and has a complex moulded plinth, with bronze plaques containing inscriptions and names, surmounted by a tall column with a hollow-section triangular section. At the base of the column is a statue of a kneeling bronze figure breaking a sword over the knee, and on top of the column is a bronze figure of a winged victory holding a garland.	II
Two telephone kiosks 53.96231°N 2.01615°W		1935	The telephone kiosks in front of the town hall are of the K6 type designed by Giles Gilbert Scott. Constructed in cast iron with a square plan and a dome, they have three unperforated crowns in the top panels.	II
1 Chapel Hill; 53.96374°N 2.01791°W		Undated	The shop is in stone, and has quoins. The gable end faces the street, and has two storeys and an attic, and two bays. The doorway is in the centre, flanked by two windows, there are two windows on the upper floor, and one on the attic.	II
Milestone on A19 road 53.97160°N 1.97471°W		Undated	The milestone on the north side of the A59 road has a cast iron plate on stone, with a triangular plan and a rounded top. On the top is inscribed "SKIPTON AND KNARESBOROUGH ROAD" and "SKIPTON LB", on the left side are the distances to Bolton Bridge, Harrogate and Knaresborough, and on the right side to Skipton.	II
Milestone on A6131 road 53.96802°N 1.99802°W		Undated	The milestone on the south side of the A6131 road has a cast iron plate on stone, with a triangular plan and a rounded top. On the top is inscribed "SKIPTON AND KNARESBOROUGH ROAD" and "SKIPTON LB", on the left side are the distances to Bolton Bridge and Harrogate, and on the right side to Skipton.	II
Pinfold; 53.96386°N 2.01831°W		Undated	The wall enclosing the pinfold, which has an irregular plan, is in stone and is about 5 feet (1.5 m) high. On the side facing the road is a rectangular doorway.	II
Former Skipton Theatre; 53.96112°N 2.01557°W	—	Undated	Originally a theatre, and later used for other purposes, it is a small building in stone. There are two storeys, and the openings have been altered. On the gable end are stone external stairs with an iron handrail and balusters.	II
