= Cock & Bottle =

Pub in Skipton, North Yorkshire, England

Coordinates: 53°57′37″N 2°01′08″W

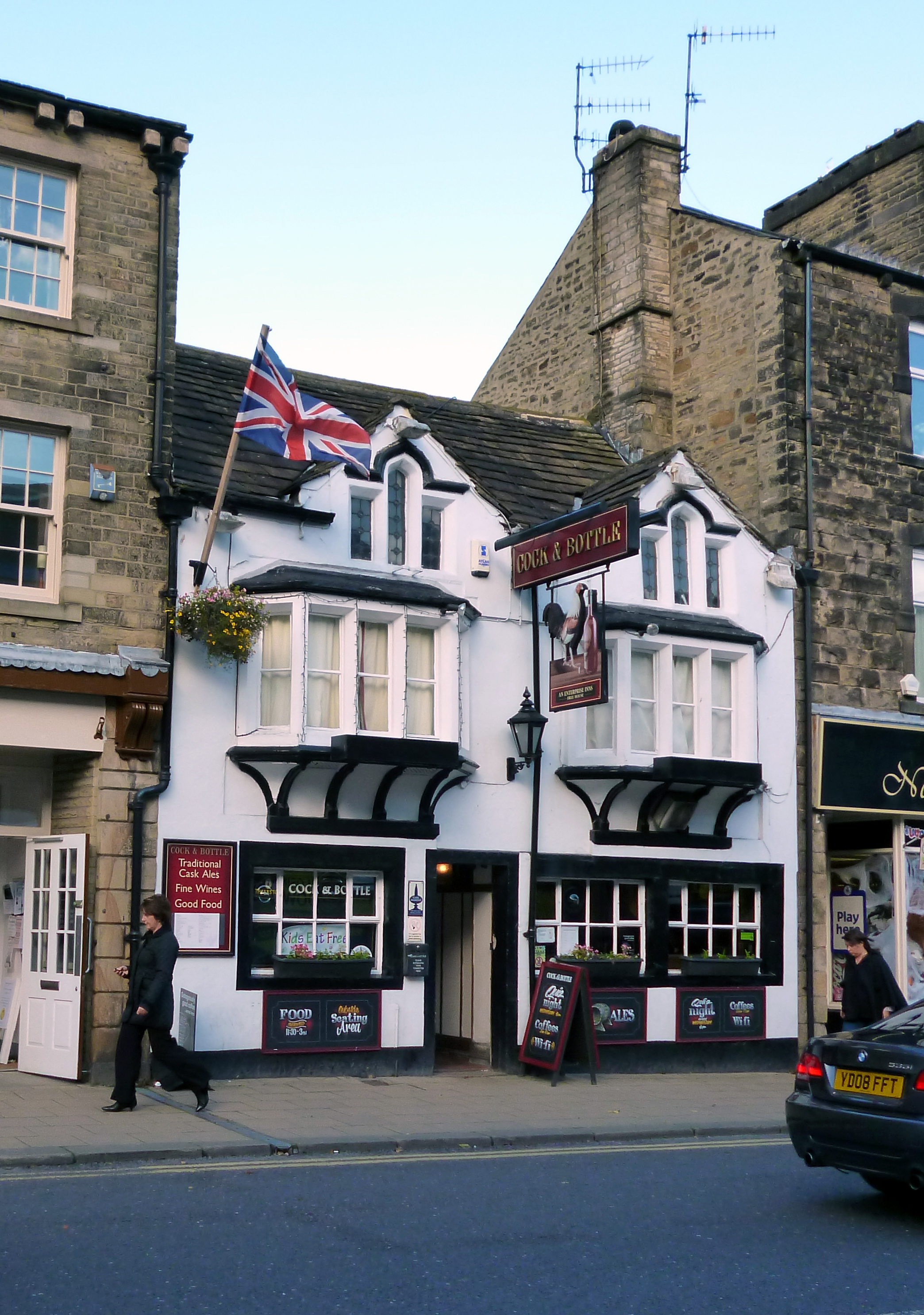
The building, in 2012

The Cock & Bottle is a historic pub in Skipton, a town in North Yorkshire, in England.

A building on the site, on Swadford Street, was first recorded in 1689, and Nikolaus Pevsner claims a 17th-century date for the front part of the building. The rear section of the pub has a plaque dated 1729, and the "Cock & Bottle" pub was first recorded in 1731. The front of the building was redesigned in a neo-Gothic style in the 19th century. In the 1980s, the small rooms on the ground floor were opened out to form a single, large, bar area. The pub has been grade II listed since 1978.

The building is constructed of painted stone with a stone flag roof. It has three low storeys and two bays. The ground floor contains a doorway and casement windows, and on the middle floor are two oriel windows with chamfered mullions and a cornice on concave-arched brackets. The top floor is gabled and contains three-light mullioned windows, the middle lights higher and arched. At the rear is a long two-storey wing with sash windows.

== See also ==
- Listed buildings in Skipton
