= Skipton Tolbooth =

Building in Skipton, North Yorkshire, England

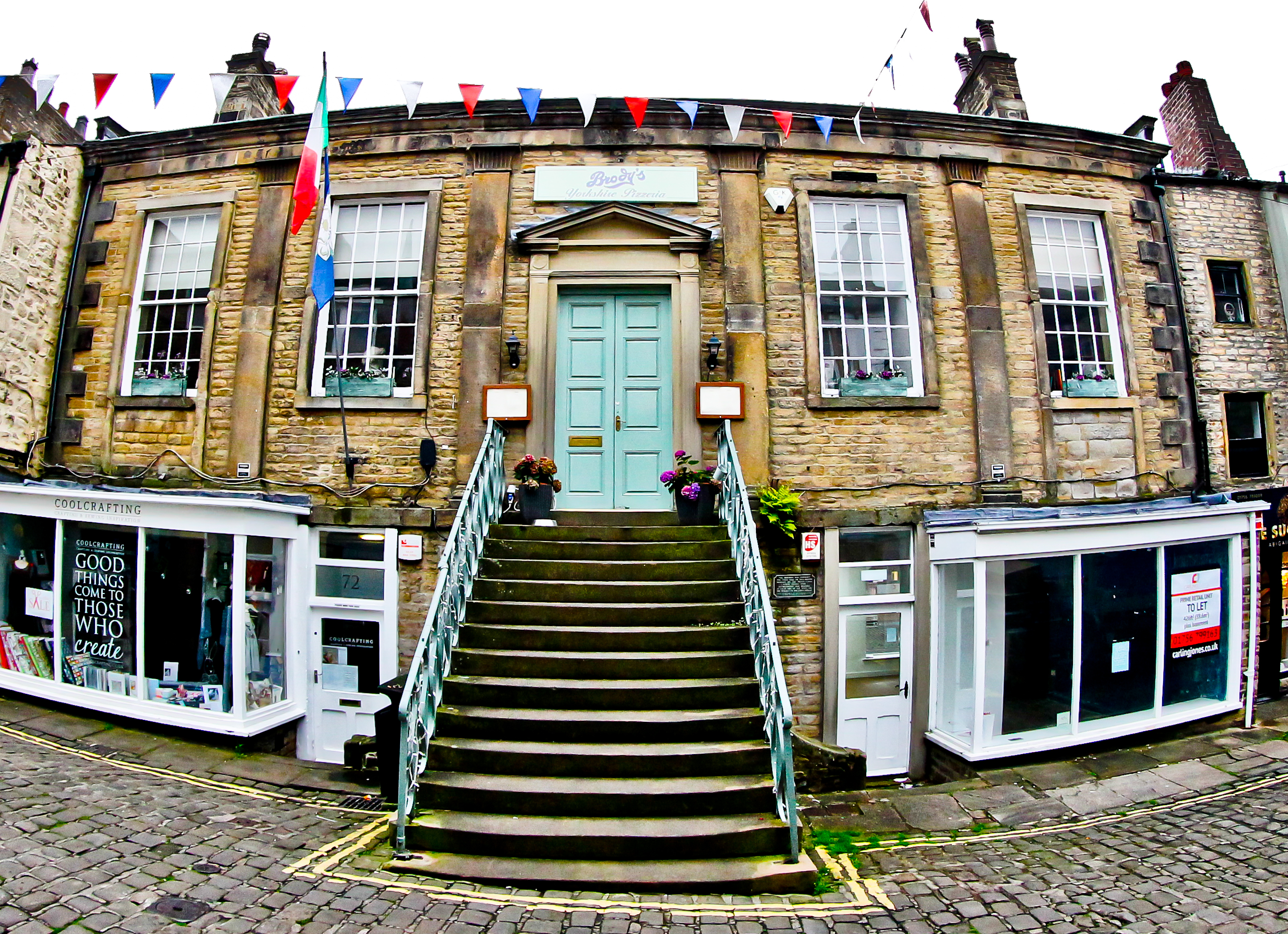
The building, in 2017

Skipton Tolbooth is a historic building in Skipton, a town in North Yorkshire, in England.

The building was constructed in the 17th century, perhaps on the site of the town's moot hall. The upper floor was used as a courtroom, while the ground floor was the town lockup. The building was altered in the 18th century, and its external appearance dates from this era. In 1864, a police station was constructed elsewhere, and the lockup became disused. The court relocated soon after, and the building was then used as a mechanics' institute. The building was later converted to retail use. The building was grade II listed in 1952. The upper floor windows were replaced in the 1970s.

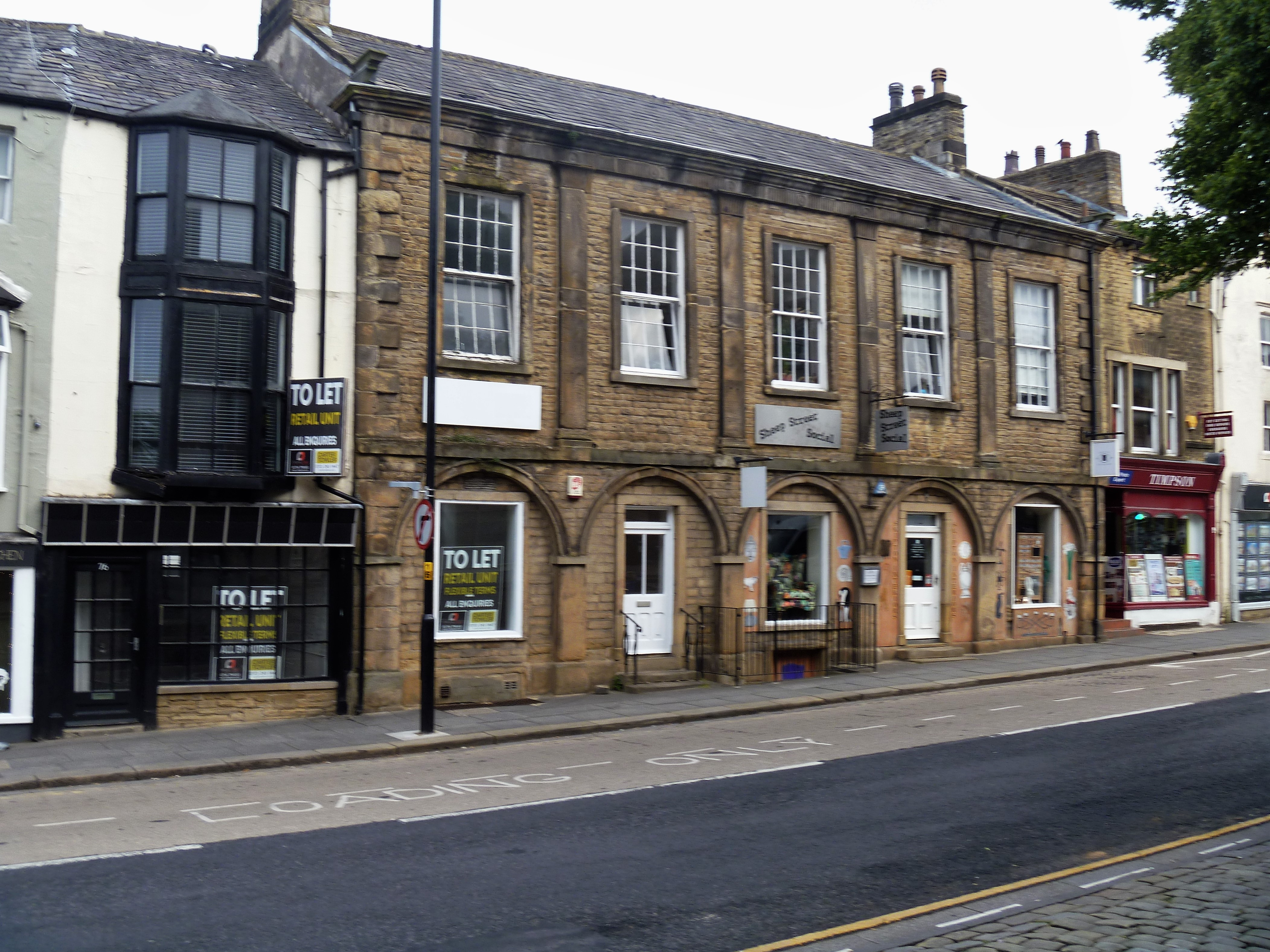
Rear of the building

The building is constructed of stone, with quoins, a floor band, pilasters between the upper floor bays with moulded bases and vertically fluted caps, an ornamental entablature at the eaves, paterae, and a roof with gable copings and springers. It has two storeys and is five bays wide. On the ground floor is an arcade of five round arches with moulded archivolts on pilasters, containing doorways and windows. The upper floor has long windows with plain surrounds.

== See also ==
- Listed buildings in Skipton
