= The Old Chapel, Skipton =

Building in Skipton, North Yorkshire, England

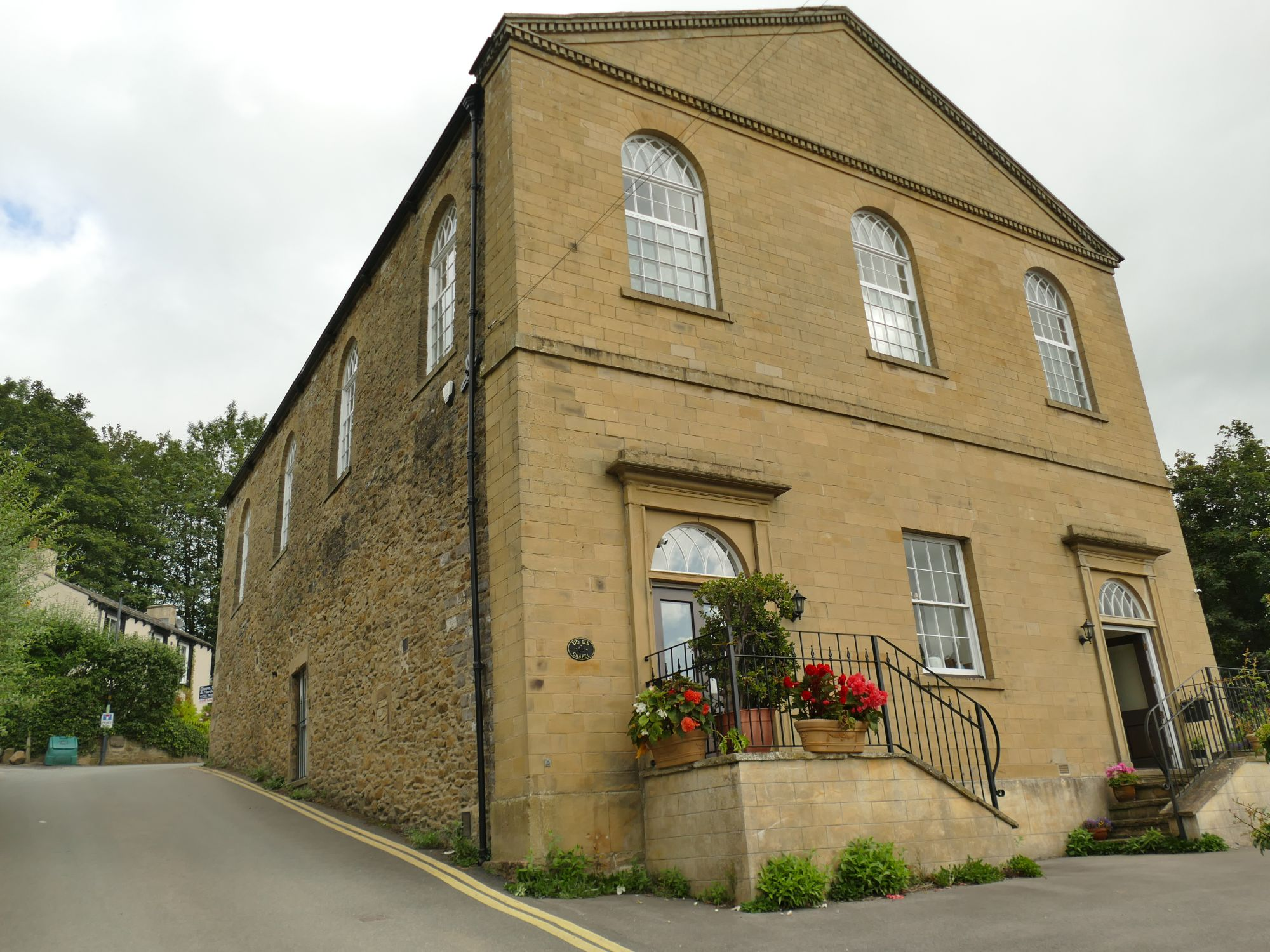
The building, in 2023

The Old Chapel is a historic building in Skipton, a town in North Yorkshire, in England.

John Wesley preached in Skipton on several occasions, and although no lasting group was formed, a Wesleyan Methodist Church group was established in 1787. In 1791, the society constructed a small chapel on what is now Chapel Hill in the town. By 1811, the congregation had grown and a larger building was needed. The original chapel was demolished and a new one constructed, perhaps using some of the old materials. By the 1860s, the congregation had grown further, and in 1865 the Water Street Wesleyan Methodist Church was built. The old chapel was converted into a school, which remained in the building until 1891. The building was later converted into a house, and was grade II listed in 1978.

The chapel is built of stone and has two storeys. The entrance front has three bays, a string course, a frieze, a cornice, and a dentilled pediment. The outer bays each contains a doorway with panelled jambs, a semicircular fanlight, a lintel and a cornice, and between them is a flat-headed window. On the upper floor, and along the sides, are round-arched windows.

== See also ==
- Listed buildings in Skipton
