= Skipton Quaker Meeting House =

Building in Skipton, North Yorkshire, England

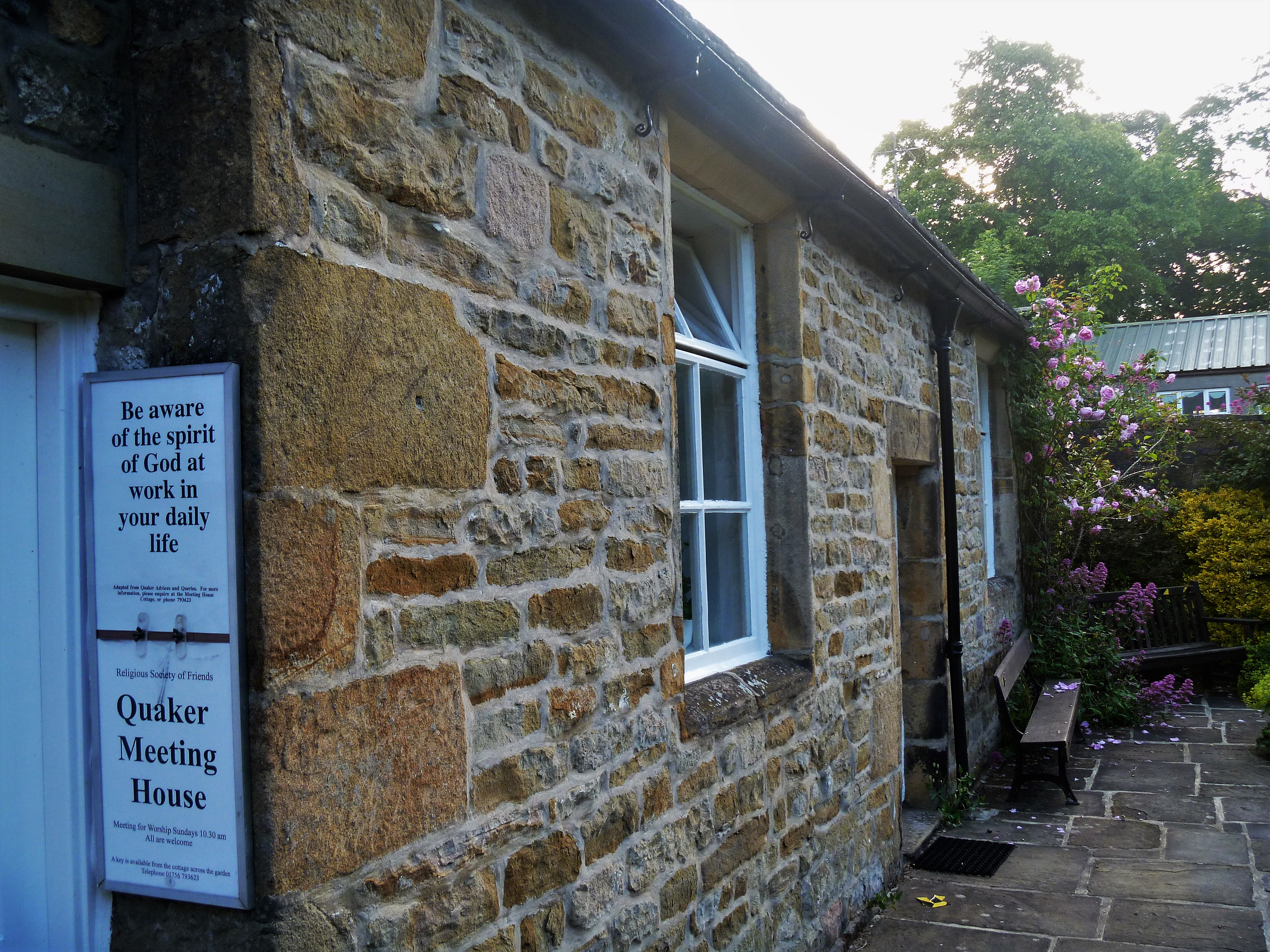
The building, in 2021

Skipton Quaker Meeting House is a historic religious building in Skipton, a town in North Yorkshire, in England.

There were already Quakers in Skipton when George Fox visited in 1658, and around this time, yearly meetings for the north of England were held in the town. In the 1660s, meetings were held in Bradley, then following the Toleration Act 1688, two Quakers in Skipton obtained licences to hold worship in their houses. In 1693 a dedicated meeting house was constructed. In 1761, the building was partitioned, and new pews were installed. A privy was added to the left of the building by 1850, and in about 1876 the stand was replaced, and the floor, windows and doorway were altered. The meeting closed in 1897, with the remaining members worshipping in Keighley, but in 1907 the meeting was revived, and at the same time, an extension was added to the right of the building. A floor was inserted in the east extension in 1972 so it could be used as short-term accommodation, and in 1988 the wooden floor in the meeting house was replaced with flagstones. In 1993, the privy extension was enlarged to provide a new lobby and toilets. The building has been grade II listed since 1978.

The building has a low single storey, it built of stone, and has a stone slate roof with copings and springers. There is a central doorway with a dated lintel and two windows. It has a rectangular plan and is internally divided into large and small rooms. There is a painted timber dado and at the east end of the large room is an elders' stand, which is probably original. The painted wooden partition has a central doorway, and the upper part of the entire partition has top-hinged shutters. There are pine benches, made in 1864 for the Carperby meeting house.

== See also ==
- Listed buildings in Skipton
