= The Devonshire Inn =

Pub in Skipton, North Yorkshire, England

Coordinates: 53.9603°N 2.0156°W

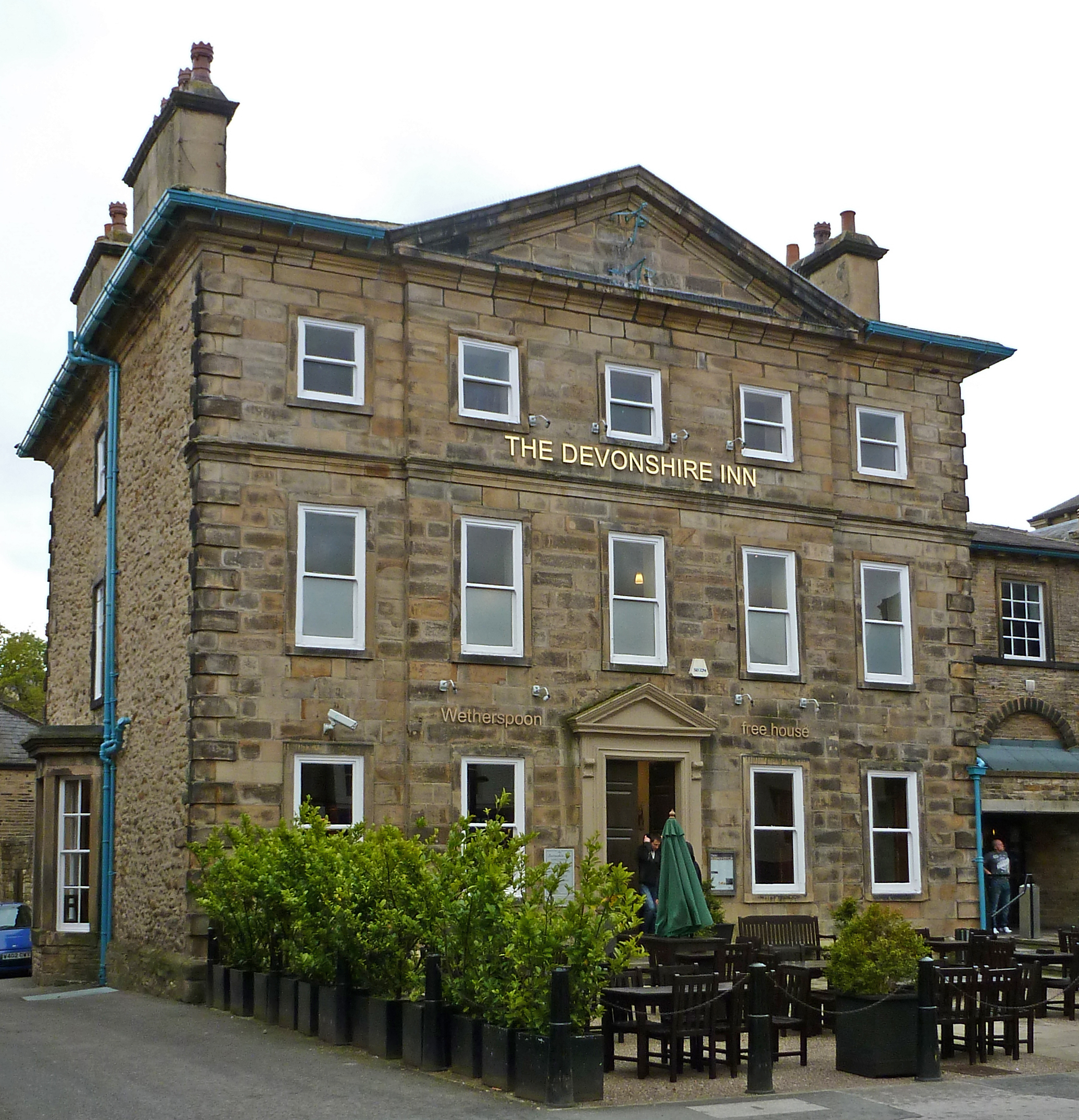
The pub, in 2012

The Devonshire Inn is a historic pub in Skipton, a town in North Yorkshire, in England.

The building was constructed in the 18th century as a replacement for an earlier pub on the site, and was originally named the "New Inn". Its design has been attributed to Richard Boyle. The building became the "Devonshire Hotel" in 1821, perhaps in reference to Boyle's daughter marrying the future Duke of Devonshire. The pub was bought by Tetley's Brewery in 1913, then in 2000 by Wetherspoons. It was refurbished in 2023. The building was grade II* listed in 1953.

The building is built of stone, painted at the rear, with rusticated quoins, a moulded string course, and a massive eaves cornice. It has three storeys and five bays, the middle three bays projecting under a pediment. Steps lead up to the central doorway that has a moulded architrave and a pediment. The windows are sashes with stone surrounds. Inside, there is an early-18th century staircase, and original doors and window shutters.

== See also ==
- Grade II* listed buildings in North Yorkshire (district)
- Listed buildings in Skipton
