= Victoria Mill, Skipton =

Building in Skipton, North Yorkshire, England

Coordinates: 53.9608°N 2.0216°W

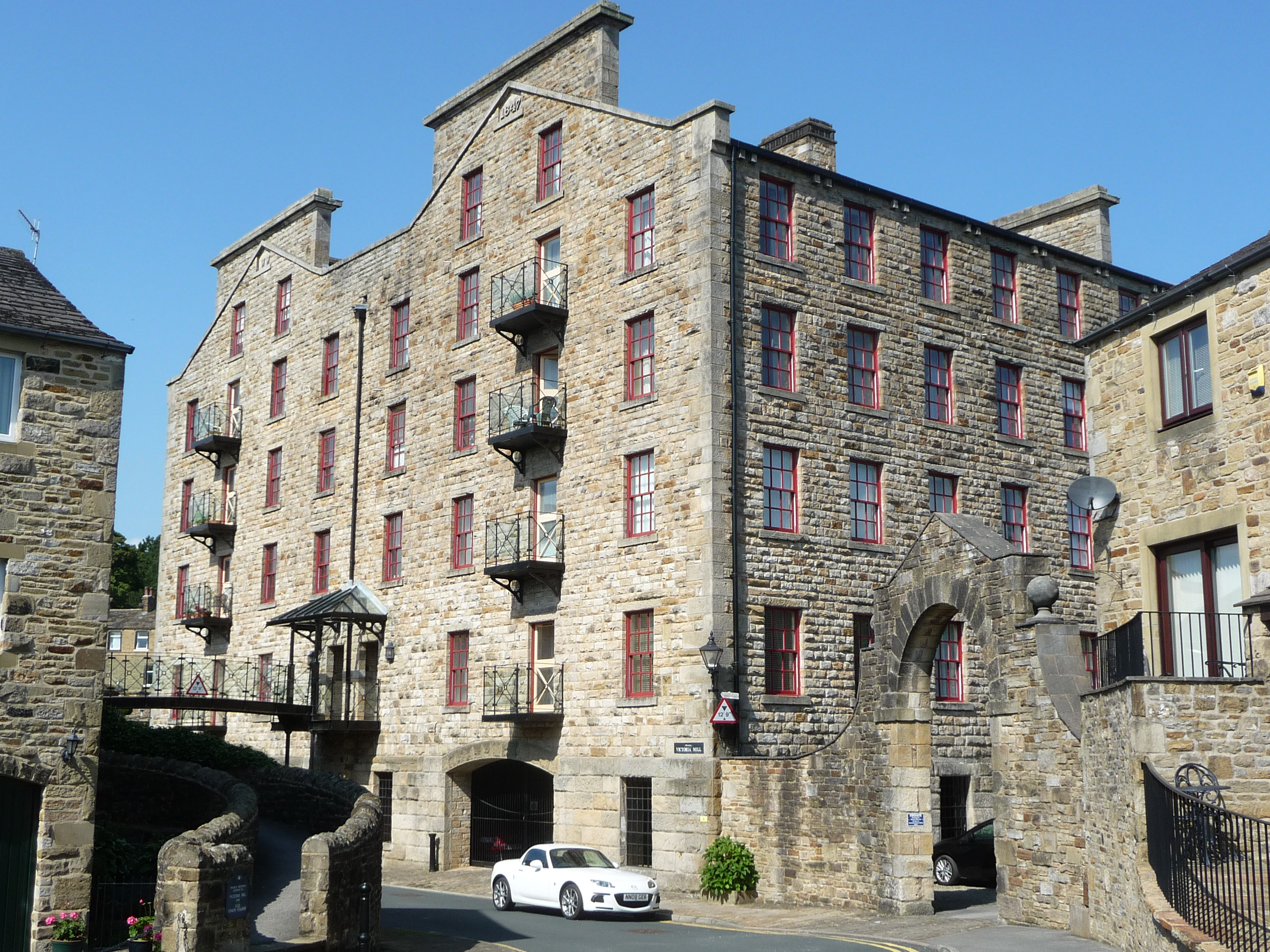
The main building, in 2018

Victoria Mill is a historic mill complex in Skipton, a town in North Yorkshire, in England.

The corn mill was constructed in 1847, by the Leeds and Liverpool Canal. From the start, it was powered by steam. It suffered a fire in 1868, though water from the canal was used to put it out, and only the roof was seriously damaged. In the early 20th century, it was converted into a paper mill. Between 1988 and 1990 it was converted into apartments, to a design by Wales, Wales and Rawson, which won a National Design Award in 1997. The main building was grade II listed in 1978, along with the detached chimney.

The main building of the mill is built of stone with quoins and a slate roof. It consists of two parallel four-bay ranges with an H-shaped roof, and a main block of five storeys and an attic and seven bays. The ranges have coped gables, raised in the centre and containing chimneys. To the west is a detached octagonal chimney on a square base, rising higher than the mill.

== See also ==
- Listed buildings in Skipton
