= High Corn Mill =

Building in Skipton, North Yorkshire, England

Coordinates: 53°57′50″N 2°01′03″W

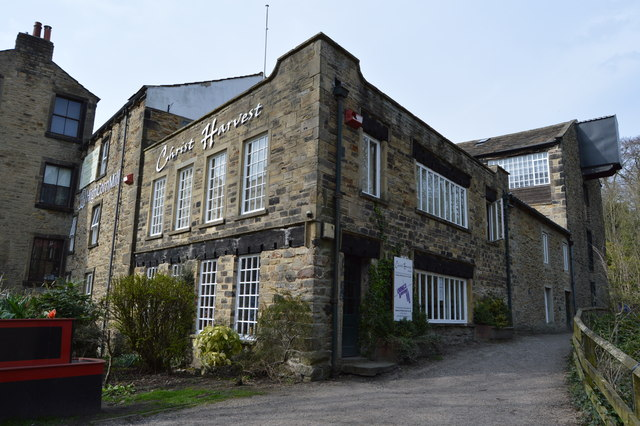
The building, in 2015

High Corn Mill is a historic building in Skipton, a town in North Yorkshire, in England.

The has been a water mill by Mill Bridge in Skipton since the Mediaeval period. The current building largely dates from the 18th century, with later alterations including replacement windows, and the filling in of openings on the top floor with brick. A turbine was installed in 1912. The mill also housed machinery to cut hay. The corn mill closed around 1946 and the building was used by an agricultural machinery company. George Leatt purchased it in the late 1960s and gradually restored the building, getting the waterwheel turning in 1970 and opening the core of the building as a living museum, while the remainder of the building houses a variety of businesses. The building has been grade II listed since 1978.

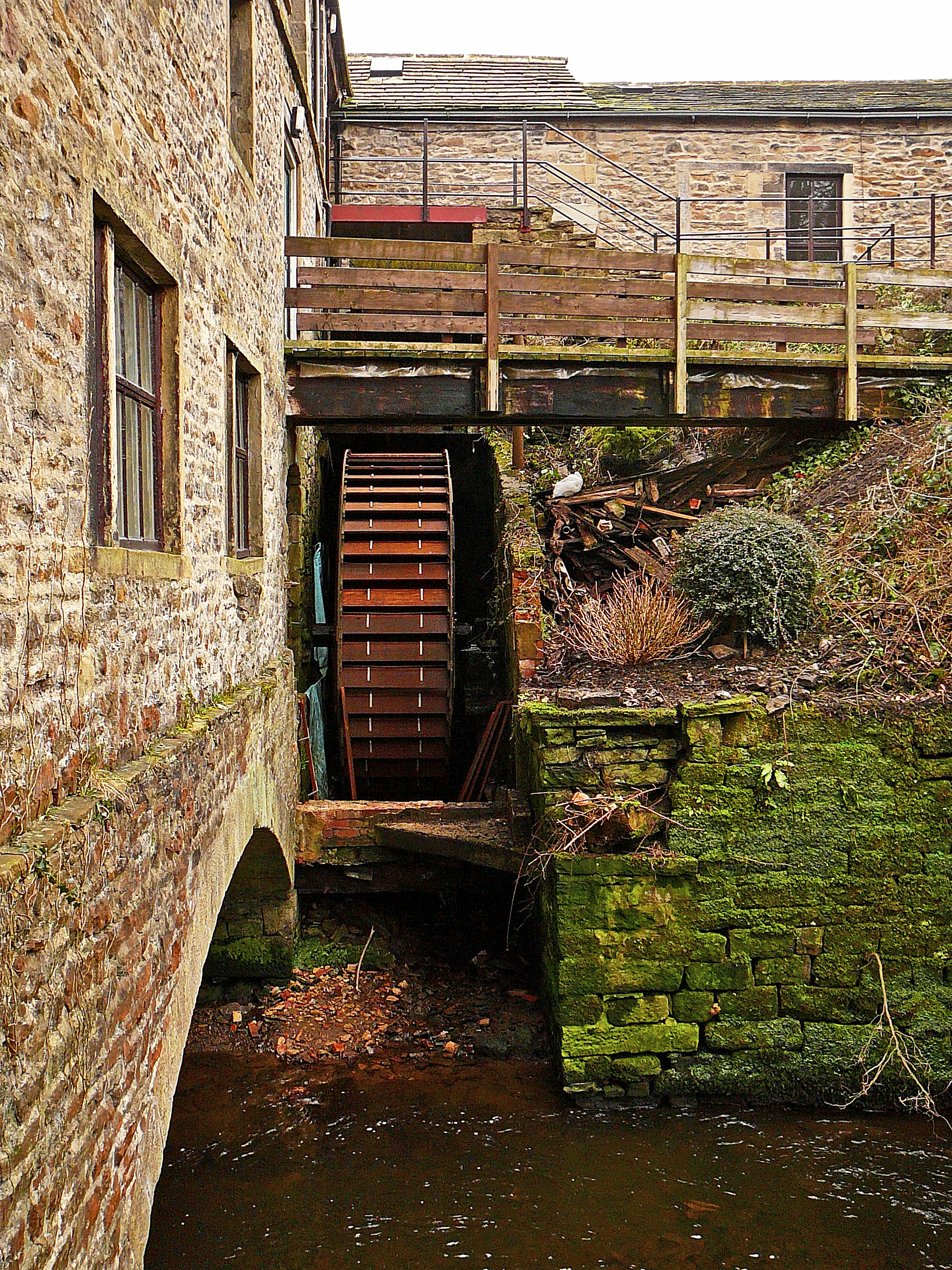
The waterwheel

The mill consists of two stone buildings straddling Eller Brook over a single span arch. It has three storeys and an L-shaped plan. The waterwheel has a 28 feet (8.5 m) diameter, and there is also a water turbine, installed in 2010.

== See also ==
- Listed buildings in Skipton
