= Dewhurst's Mill =

Mill in Skipton, North Yorkshire, England

Coordinates: 53.9596°N 2.0238°W

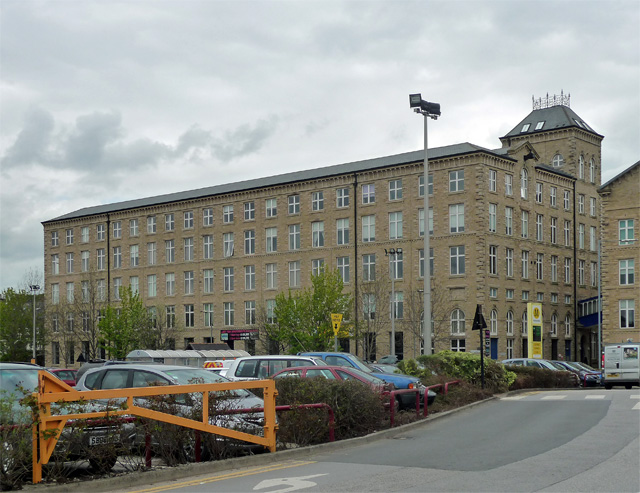
The building, in 2013

Dewhurst's Mill, also known as Belle Vue Mill, is a historic mill complex in Skipton, a town in North Yorkshire, in England.

John Dewhurst ran a spinning business in the Yorkshire Dales from the 1790s. In 1829, he constructed a worsted mill in Skipton, but it burned down in 1831. It was rebuilt before the end of the year, and reopened as a cotton mill. A large extension was added in 1852, and again between 1859 and 1860. Between 1863 and 1864, a warehouse was constructed nearby, on the site of the town's old workhouse. The largest mill building was constructed between 1867 and 1870. By this time, the mill employed 800 people working over a total floor area of 20,000 square yards (17,000 m^{2}). In 1897, the business was taken over by the English Sewing Cotton Company, which continued to use the mill to produce Sylko, marketed as a silk substitute. The mill closed in the early 1980s, and its prominent main chimney was demolished. The building was converted to manufacture greetings cards, then later turned into offices, including the headquarters of Craven District Council.

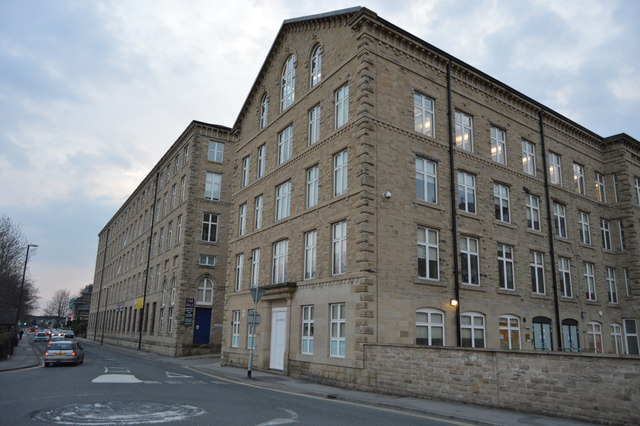
The third building

The complex has been collectively grade II listed since 1978. It is built of stone with hipped roofs in slate and glazing. The main block has five storeys and 20 bays, with rusticated quoins, dentilled sill bands and casement windows. The east range has a U-shaped plan, with five storeys and ranges of ten and 15 bays, and the third building has four storeys and seven bays. At the rear is a chimney, and there are two water towers, the larger with a hipped roof, an iron belvedere and a bracketed cornice.

== See also ==
- Listed buildings in Skipton
