= Winstanley College =

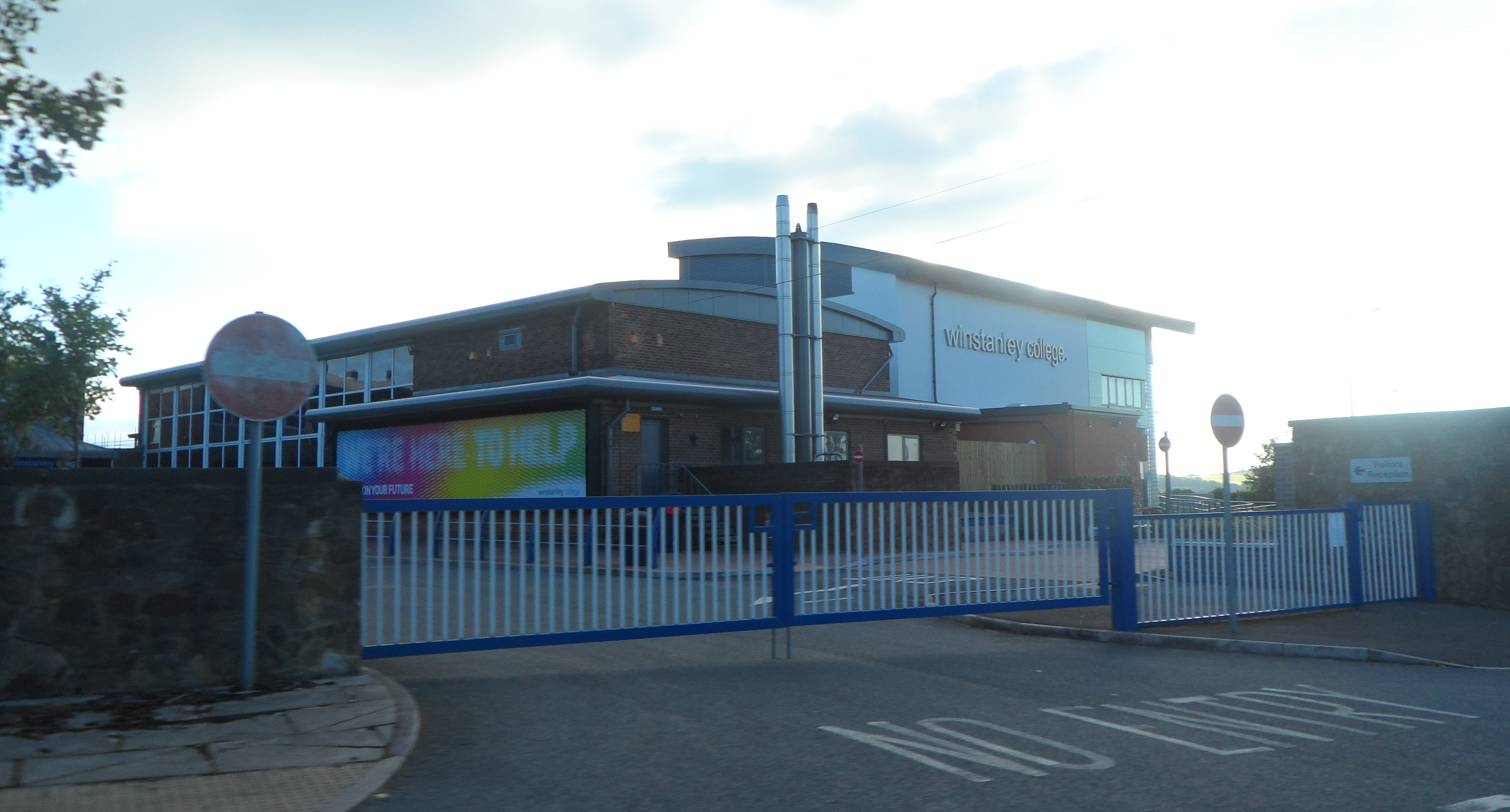
- Entrance to Winstanley College

Location
- Winstanley Road; Wigan, Greater Manchester, WN5 7XF; England; 53.5237°N 2.7029°W

Information
- Former name: Upholland Grammar School
- Type: Sixth form college
- Established: 1977; 49 years ago
- Local authority: Wigan
- Specialist: A-Levels
- Department for Education URN: 130522 Tables
- Ofsted: Reports
- Chair: James Pearson
- Principal: Simon Lett
- Deputy Principal: Deborah Owen
- Gender: Coeducational
- Age: 16 to 19
- Enrolment: 1,803
- Colours: Blue, White
- Affiliations: Maple Group
- Website: www.winstanley.ac.uk

Winstanley College is a sixth-form college in the Billinge Higher End area of the Metropolitan Borough of Wigan, Greater Manchester.

== Admissions ==
In the academic year 2023-24 it had 2358 full-time students. The catchment area spreads across several areas of the North West of England, incorporating much of Wigan, Bolton, Preston, Salford, West Lancashire, Chorley, Warrington, St. Helens, Sefton and Knowsley.

== Buildings ==
The college's campus consists of 10 different buildings, housing various different subject and social areas as follows:

A Corridor (ground floor of main building) - Humanities and multiple computer suites.

Art and Design Block - Art, Art Foundation, Graphics, Photography, Textiles and all art subjects.

B Corridor (first floor of main building) - Business Studies, Economics, and Computing and IT.

C Block - English, Languages, Law and Politics.

D Block - Music, Music Technology, Dance, Performing Arts, Film, Media Studies, and the new Media T-Level.

M Block - History

N Block - Maths and Social Sciences

S Block - Biology, Chemistry, Physics, Engineering and Guidance.

WinFit Centre - Sports, PE and Social Areas

The Library - Learning Support, Library and Computer suites.

Y Block - Social Sciences

== Student Union and Societies ==
Winstanley College Students' Union is an independent union and a member of the National Union of Students. The student union is run by the Student Union Executive, which contains eight officers. Usually, each officer is a second-year student, elected by Lower Sixth students, going into the Upper Sixth year. The college also accommodates a BAME society, LGBTQ society and has students sat on the Equality and Diversity group.

== Winstanley TV ==
Winstanley TV Logo

Winstanley TV is a TV and YouTube Channel ran by the college's media department, run by lower and upper-sixth students and producing a variety of different types of content. Winstanley TV gives students the opportunity to experience working in a TV studio, working with equipment both in front of and behind the camera. The station was founded by former student Adam McClean, who went on to become a journalist and broadcaster with Granada Reports, BBC Breakfast, and BBC News.

The College Theatre was used to host an episode of BBC Question Time about the Makerfield By-election. The venue was also used to host the Manchester Evening News election hustings - again for the Makefield By-election. The current Prime Minister Andy Burnham attended both of those programmes - who at the time was fighting to become the MP for Makerfield following the resignation of Josh Simons. Winstanley essentially played a pivotal role in the history of UK Parliament, with Andy Burnham walking straight into the role of Prime Minister after becoming the MP for Makerfield.

== History ==
=== Grammar school ===
The college officially began life as Upholland Grammar School, which was founded in 1661, initially opened on School Lane, Up Holland. The grammar school later moved to the Ox House Heyes Estate on Oxhouse Road in 1878, now the present-day site of Up Holland High School. The grammar school moved to its present site on Winstanley Road, in Winstanley, in September 1953. It had 600 boys and girls in the 1960s and had 750 by 1976. During World War II the grammar school had its own Air Cadet Squadron – 1439 (Beacon) squadron with the headmaster Alfred Maggs BA MSc as the first commanding officer (Flt Lt A. Maggs RAFVR(T)).

=== Sixth form college ===
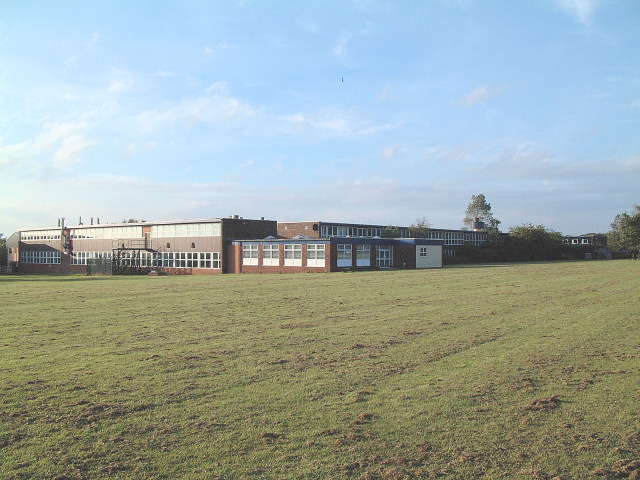
College buildings

It was renamed Winstanley College in August 1977, and at that time, it ceased to enrol new pupils at age 11, gradually becoming a sixth form college. By September 1981, no pupils remained in the lower forms, and the transformation to a sixth-form college was complete. In 1995 the college was inspected by the Further Education Funding Council, where it was awarded Grades 1 and 2 in most categories, having been awarded a Grade 3 in accommodation. In 1999 the College was reinspected by the FEFC where the college received Grade 1s in most areas, except in the areas of General Resources, where it was awarded a Grade 2, and Governance, where it was awarded a Grade 3. Following the abolition of the Further Education Funding Council in 2000, the college was inspected by Ofsted for the first time in 2004 and it received an outstanding award, the highest award available from an Ofsted inspection, and following reinspection in 2007, the college would again receive an Outstanding award. In early 2009, plans were unveiled for an extensive redevelopment of the grounds, which was subsequently put to the Learning & Skills Council for approval. In mid-2009 the project was shelved for lack of grant funding. Since that time the college has redeveloped the 1950s buildings by replacing its flat roofs, the music block was replaced with a £3m building for media and performing arts which was completed in 2012. A replacement library block and new accommodation for physical sciences and biology, along with a refurbishment of the maths building was completed in 2014. In March 2019, a new social sciences building was opened, home to sociology, psychology, health and social care. The college was reinspected in 2020, and it received a good award, and upon reinspection in 2025, the college would be upgraded to Outstanding again.

== Notable alumni ==
- Richard Ashcroft, Pete Salisbury, Simon Jones & Nick McCabe- from the band The Verve.
- Sara Bayman – Netball player for England; bronze medallist at the 2010 Commonwealth Games.
- Shaun Briscoe – rugby league footballer for Hull Kingston Rovers formerly of Wigan Warriors and Hull
- Sam Darbyshire – Hollyoaks Jamie "Fletch" Fletcher
- Helen Don-Duncan, backstroke swimmer in the 200m event at the 2000 Olympics
- Roger Draper, Chief Executive since 2006 of the Lawn Tennis Association
- Matthew McNulty – The Terror, Lt Little
- Ibinabo Jack, Vera DC Jacqueline Williams
- Lucy Gaskell – Casualty Kirsty Clements
- David Grindley – British 400 metre runner. Bronze medallist at the 1992 Barcelona Olympic Games
- Leah Hackett – Hollyoaks Tina McQueen
- Nisha Katona – chef
- Adam McClean – BBC Breakfast and BBC News journalist (founded college TV station Winstanley TV)
- Leon Osman – professional footballer for Everton FC
- Carley Stenson – Hollyoaks Steph Dean, Shrek the Musical Princess Fiona, Legally Blonde (musical) Elle Woods, Les Miserables (musical) Fantine
- Davinia Taylor (née Murphy), actress
- Georgia Taylor – Coronation Street Toyah Battersby, Casualty Ruth Winters
- Mollie Winnard, actress
- Nicholas Woods – first-class cricketer

=== Upholland Grammar School ===
- Catherine Ashton, Baroness Ashton of Upholland – High Representative of the European Union for Foreign Affairs and Security Policy, former Leader of the House of Lords and European Commissioner for Trade
- Dr. Charles Bamforth, Professor of Brewing at the University of California
- Thomas Berridge, Liberal MP from 1906 to 1910 for Warwick and Leamington (his father was a former headmaster)
- John Carleton, rugby union player
- George Henry Evans Hopkins, entomologist
- Linder Sterling, photographer and performance artist
- Prof Allan Matthews, Professor of Surface Engineering and Tribology at The University of Manchester, Director of the BP International Centre for Advanced Materials
- Canon Joseph Robinson, Canon of Canterbury and Master of the Temple
- Peter Williams (English rugby player), rugby union
