= Chappie (soundtrack) =

2015 film score by Hans Zimmer

Chappie (Original Motion Picture Soundtrack)

Film score by Hans Zimmer and the Chappie Elektrik Synthphonia
- Released: March 10, 2015
- Recorded: 2014–2015
- Studio: Remote Control Productions, Santa Monica, California; Sony Scoring Stage, Sony Pictures Studios, Culver City, California
- Genre: Film score
- Length: 63:06
- Label: Varèse Sarabande
- Producer: Hans Zimmer

Hans Zimmer chronology
Interstellar (2014)	Chappie (2015)	Woman in Gold (2015)

Chappie (Original Motion Picture Soundtrack) is the film score to the 2015 film Chappie directed by Neill Blomkamp. The film score is composed by Hans Zimmer who formed a supergroup called the Chappie Elektrik Synthphonia, that featured Steve Mazzaro, Andrew Kawczynski, Andy Page, Ed Buller, Michael Tritter, Rich Walters and Junkie XL. The soundtrack was released digitally through Varèse Sarabande on March 10, 2015, and physically released a week later.

== Background ==
In December 2013, Ryan Amon who previously scored for Blomkamp's Elysium (2013) was set to reteam with the director on Chappie. Subsequently, Chris Clark and Rich Walters were also announced to co-compose the music with Amon. However, by November 2014, they were replaced by Hans Zimmer who took over the scoring dues. Zimmer composed the score with mostly electronic music and had collaborated with Steve Mazzaro, Andrew Kawczynski, Andy Page, Ed Buller, Michael Tritter, Rich Walters and Junkie XL to form a supergroup called the Chappie Elektrik Synthphonia.

== Release ==
The soundtrack was released digitally on March 10, 2015, and in physical formats on March 17, under the Varèse Sarabande label.

== Track listing ==
No.	Title	Length
1.	"It's a Dangerous City"	2:09
2.	"The Only Way Out of This"	4:58
3.	"Use Your Mind"	4:04
4.	"A Machine That Thinks and Feels"	3:03
5.	"Firmware Update"	3:52
6.	"Welcome To the Real World"	3:52
7.	"The Black Sheep"	4:28
8.	"Indestructible Robot Gangster #1"	3:11
9.	"Breaking the Code"	4:49
10.	"Rudest Bad Boy In Joburg"	2:41
11.	"You Lied To Me"	4:06
12.	"Mayhem Downtown"	3:57
13.	"The Outside Is Temporary"	3:09
14.	"Never Break a Promise"	7:43
15.	"We Own This Sky"	4:19
16.	"Illest Gangsta On the Block"	2:45
Total length:		63:06

== Reception ==
Pete Simons of Synchrotones wrote:

"For most listeners Hans Zimmer's "Chappie" will prove quite the challenge [...] some of the soundscapes really interesting, some of the EDM-inspired cue quite exciting and [the] main theme works. There seem to be three central ideas: the lullaby, a grown-up theme and the mechanical tick-tock. Zimmer manages to juxtapose those on several occasions, giving the score some depth. At times, [we wonder that] this is Zimmer applying for the "Blade Runner 2" job, though it's a long way off that classic. So no, it didn't entirely float the proverbial boat, but there is plenty to enjoy."

Filmtracks wrote: "Zimmer and his crew's approach to Chappie is basically functional but contains several truly unlistenable action sequences and sadly misses a great chance to represent a humanity's last best hope, a robot, with organic elements against the alternative." James Southall of Movie Wave called it "an ultimately rewarding experience, one designed very intricately and with a great deal of effort."

Tim Grierson of Screen International noted that Zimmer's score is "rousingly bombastic with shades of future-tech paranoia". Liam Lacey of The Globe and Mail admitted that Zimmer's score has " lot of synth hums and growls". Richard Lawson of Vanity Fair said, "Hans Zimmer's score, all pulse and swell mixed with hints of Inception bwaaamp, doing some pretty effective indicating." Justin Chang of Variety and Todd McCarthy of The Hollywood Reporter called it "bombastic" and "synth-heavy". Chris Bumbray of JoBlo.com called it a "propulsive score" which was "nearly on-par with the scores [Zimmer] writes for Christopher Nolan".

== Credits ==
Credits adapted from liner notes:

- Music composer and producer – Hans Zimmer
- Additional music – Andrew Kawczynski, Steve Mazzaro
- Sequencer programming – Nathan Stornetta
- Synth programming – Andy Page, Hans Zimmer, Rich Walters
- Sound design – Junkie XL
- Analogue synth design – Ed Buller, Michael Tritter
- Digital instrument design – Mark Wherry
- Technical score engineer – Chuck Choi, Stephanie McNally
- Additional engineer – John Witt Chapman
- Recording and mixing – Alan Meyerson
- Mixing assistance – Christian Wenger
- Mastering – Gavin Lurssen
- Score editor – Jack Dolman
- Supervising score editor – Rich Walters
- Assistant score editor – Catherine Wilson
- Musical assistance – Cynthia Park
- Technical assistance – Jacqueline Friedberg, Julian Pastorelli
- Executive producer – Robert Townson
- Stage manager for Remote Control Productions – Shalini Singh
- Scoring crew – Drew Jordan, Raul Vega, Taurees Habib
- Executive in charge of music for Sony Pictures – Lia Vollack, Lia Vollack
- Music production services – Steven Kofsky
- Music consultant – Czarina Russell

== Accolades ==
Accolades received by Interstellar
Award	Date of ceremony	Category	Recipient(s)	Result	Ref.
World Soundtrack Awards	October 24, 2015	Film Composer of the Year	Hans Zimmer (also for Interstellar)	Nominated	
