= Adam McClean =

British journalist, broadcaster and filmmaker

Adam McClean (born c. 1989) is a British journalist, broadcaster and filmmaker who works for the BBC. He presents national television news items for BBC Breakfast and BBC News. He is also credited as having worked on Panorama. He spent his early career working for ITV on Granada Reports.

== Career ==
McClean began his career in journalism working for the BBC whilst studying, first featuring on BBC Radio Manchester and BBC Online in 2009. He joined the ITV Granada regional news team after graduating from the University of Central Lancashire in 2010. He began featuring on the ITV national news in 2013.

He was among the first journalists to arrive at the scene of the Manchester Arena bombing from where he broadcast live news reports for global television networks including Al Jazeera English, CNN and Network 10. This work was recognised by an O2 Media Award in 2017.

In October 2018 McClean was appointed Lancashire Correspondent for Granada Reports before he left the programme at the end of 2019.

During the Coronavirus disease 2019 pandemic McClean joined the BBC, working on BBC Breakfast and BBC News.

== Education ==
He graduated from the University of Central Lancashire with a degree in Journalism. Whilst studying for A-levels he founded a student television station at Winstanley College, which continues broadcasting on YouTube. He attended St. Bede's Catholic High School in Ormskirk.

== Awards ==
McClean is the recipient of a BAFTA for News Coverage, won with the Granada Reports team in 2013. He won a Royal Television Society award for his coverage of the 2011 England riots. He received an O2 Media Award for his coverage of the Manchester Arena bombing in 2017 and was named 'Young Journalist of the Year' by O2 in 2013.

McClean was named the 'Newcomer of the Year' to ITV News in 2011.
