= Interstellar (soundtrack) =

2014 soundtrack album by Hans Zimmer

Interstellar: Original Motion Picture Soundtrack

Soundtrack album by Hans Zimmer
- Released: November 17, 2014
- Studios: AIR Lyndhurst Hall; Temple Church (London)
- Genres: Contemporary classical; minimal; ambient
- Length: 71:38
- Label: WaterTower
- Producers: Hans Zimmer; Christopher Nolan; Alex Gibson

Hans Zimmer chronology
The Amazing Spider-Man 2 (2014)	Interstellar: Original Motion Picture Soundtrack (2014)	Chappie (2015)

Interstellar: Original Motion Picture Soundtrack is the soundtrack album composed and arranged by Hans Zimmer for the 2014 film Interstellar by Christopher Nolan. The soundtrack garnered universal acclaim and was nominated for the Academy Award for Best Original Score and the Grammy Award for Best Score Soundtrack for Visual Media.

== Background and production ==
Hans Zimmer had previously worked with director Christopher Nolan several times, scoring Nolan's The Dark Knight film trilogy and Inception. Without revealing the plot of Interstellar, Nolan wrote a short story for Zimmer about a father leaving a child to complete an important job. The story contained two sentences of dialogue: "I’ll come back," and "When?" Nolan then asked Zimmer to spend one day composing some musical interpretations of the story.

I am going to give you an envelope with a letter in it. One page. It's going to tell you the fable at the center of the story. You work for one day, then play me what you have written.

— Christopher Nolan, on the Interstellar score composition process with Hans Zimmer

In one night, Zimmer wrote a four-minute piano and organ piece that represented his idea of fatherhood. When he played it for Nolan, Nolan was pleased and explained the full plot and concept of the film, though it had not yet been written. Zimmer was originally skeptical, noting that he had written a "tiny, tiny little fragile" piece while Nolan had described an intense, epic space film. However, Nolan reassured Zimmer that the piano piece provided "the heart" of the film. The piece can be heard at the conclusion of the film.

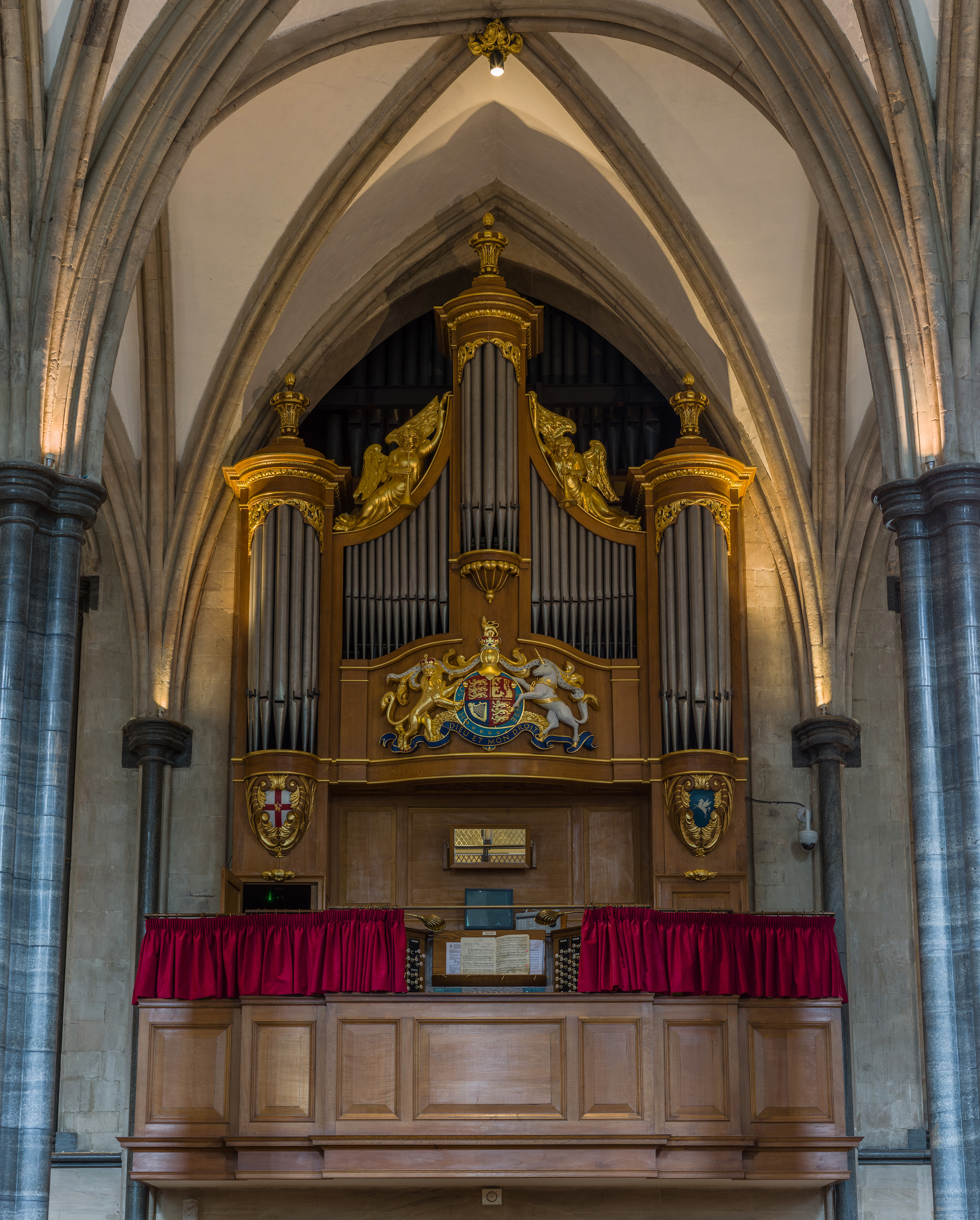
1926 Harrison & Harrison organ in Temple Church

For the film's signature organ, Zimmer specifically requested that organist Roger Sayer, the music director of Temple Church in London, play the church's 1926 four-manual Harrison & Harrison organ. The physical appearance of the organ reminded Zimmer of spaceship afterburners, while the airiness of its sound evoked the reminder that every breath is precious for an astronaut. The rest of the ensemble consisted of 34 strings, 24 woodwinds, four pianos, and a mixed choir of 60 voices. The soundtrack was recorded at both Temple Church and AIR Lyndhurst Hall in late spring 2014.

In 2022, Zimmer cited the Interstellar soundtrack as the best work of his career.

== Release ==
Hans Zimmer himself delayed the soundtrack album's release until two weeks after the film premiere because he wanted audiences to hear the score in theaters first.

We wanted people to really hear it for the first time with the movie on really big speakers in a theater... I just didn't want people to go and hear everything on tiny little speakers on their Mac or something like this. I wanted them to go and have the visceral experience of being pinned in their seats.

— Hans Zimmer, on his decision to release the Interstellar soundtrack album after the film's release date

The soundtrack was released on November 17, 2014, via the WaterTower label. On November 13, 2020, WaterTower released an expanded edition of the soundtrack.

== Critical reception ==
Professional ratings
Review scores
Source	Rating
Movie Music UK	Positive
Movie Wave	5/5 stars
Sputnikmusic	4.5/5 stars
Soundtrack Geek	84.5/100
Soundtrack Dreams	98/100
Space Cadet Bling	5/5 stars
Soundtrack.net	5/5 stars
Filmwerk	4/5 stars
Filmtracks	2/5 stars
AllMusic	4/5 stars

The score received critical acclaim. Reviewing for BBC News, Nicholas Barber felt, "Hans Zimmer's music makes the film seem even more colossal than it would otherwise: Zimmer invokes the original meaning of 'pulls out all the stops', rattling our teeth with reverberating pipe-organ chords." Scott Foundas, a chief film critic at Variety, stated, "Hans Zimmer contributes one of his most richly imagined and inventive scores, which ranges from a gentle electronic keyboard melody to brassy, Strauss-ian crescendos.

Tim Robey of The Telegraph felt "With the vast sounds of a composer set loose on his grandest ever assignment. But it relies less on Straussian majesty à la 2001 than something rather more pointed: the hypnotic, metronomically surging, and oddly sacred homage Zimmer gives us to Koyaanisqatsi by Philip Glass." Todd McCarthy, reviewing for The Hollywood Reporter, praised it as, "soaring, sometimes domineering and unconventionally orchestrated wall-of-sound score" For The Globe and Mail, Liam Lacey stated, "Throughout, Hans Zimmer's music throbs obtrusively, occasionally fighting with the dialogue for our attention." "As usual, Nolan's frequent collaborator Hans Zimmer has come up with a score that fits the impossible dimensions of the film, and the music adds tremendously to the excitement", said critic Rene Rodriguez, writing for The Miami Herald. Steven Biscotti of Soundtrack.net too praised the soundtrack stating, "Hans Zimmer has created a close to perfect musical canvas for those extremely dedicated to the audio experience. The compositional technique on the album may turn off a few, as it is different than Zimmer's recent offerings. However, for those that stick with the album, they will see it 'not go gentle into that good night.' Zimmer's Interstellar rages!" and awarded a perfect five out of five stars.

Jonathan Broxton of Movie Music UK acclaimed the album, stating, "The orchestration choices, especially the stripped down ensemble and the use of the pipe organ, shows a composer not afraid to think outside the box, and find unique solutions to the musical problems his film presents, and the emotional content of the score is high, but not overwhelming", and summarised with, "It's an absolute lock for an Oscar nomination, and is one of the best scores of 2014."

In his in-depth musical analysis, Mark Richards of Film Music Notes concludes: "Rather than simply being associated with a certain character or group of characters, Zimmer’s themes tend to emphasize the emotions a particular character or group is feeling at various points in the film. [...] Interstellar has at its core an emotional story of love between a father and his daughter. Appropriately, Hans Zimmer places the Murph and Cooper theme front and center in the score [...]. Of course, since the film also includes some riveting action sequences, the score does make use of an action theme, but in typical Zimmer style, this theme serves two different functions as it is also the familial love theme. [...] And Zimmer also captures Interstellar’s focus on the wonder of the natural world in a separate theme. Thus, the score provides an effective glue for the film by drawing emotional links between various events, character motivations, and visual spectacles that might otherwise seem rather disconnected."

== Track listing ==
=== Standard edition ===
No.	Title	Length
1.	"Dreaming Of The Crash"	3:55
2.	"Cornfield Chase"	2:06
3.	"Dust"	5:41
4.	"Day One"	3:19
5.	"Stay"	6:52
6.	"Message from Home"	1:40
7.	"The Wormhole"	1:30
8.	"Mountains"	3:39
9.	"Afraid of Time"	2:32
10.	"A Place Among the Stars"	3:27
11.	"Running Out"	1:57
12.	"I'm Going Home"	5:48
13.	"Coward"	8:26
14.	"Detach"	6:42
15.	"S.T.A.Y."	6:23
16.	"Where We're Going"	7:41
Total length:		71:38

=== Deluxe edition bonus tracks ===
No.	Title	Length
17.	"First Step"	1:47
18.	"Flying Drone"	1:53
19.	"Atmospheric Entry"	1:40
20.	"No Need to Come Back"	4:32
21.	"Imperfect Lock"	6:54
22.	"No Time for Caution"	4:06
23.	"What Happens Now?"	2:26
24.	"Do Not Go Gentle into That Good Night" (poem by Dylan Thomas) (recited by John Lithgow, Ellen Burstyn, Casey Affleck, Jessica Chastain, Matthew McConaughey, and Mackenzie Foy)	1:39
Total length:		20:51

=== Illuminated Star Projection edition ===
Disc 1
No.	Title	Length
1.	"Dreaming of the Crash"	3:55
2.	"Cornfield Chase"	2:06
3.	"Dust"	5:41
4.	"Day One"	3:19
5.	"Stay"	6:52
6.	"Message from Home"	1:40
7.	"The Wormhole"	1:30
8.	"Mountains"	3:39
9.	"Afraid of Time"	2:32
10.	"A Place Among the Stars"	3:27
11.	"Running Out"	1:57
12.	"I'm Going Home"	5:48
13.	"Coward"	8:26
14.	"Detach"	6:42
15.	"S.T.A.Y."	6:23
16.	"Where We're Going"	7:41
Total length:		71:38

Disc 2
No.	Title	Length
1.	"First Step"	1:48
2.	"Flying Drone"	1:53
3.	"Atmospheric Entry"	1:39
4.	"No Need to Come Back"	4:33
5.	"Imperfect Lock"	6:55
6.	"What Happens Now?"	2:05
7.	"Who's They?"	7:17
8.	"Murph"	11:21
9.	"Organ Variation"	4:52
10.	"Tick-Tock"	8:19
11.	"Day One" (Original Demo)	3:49
12.	"Do Not Go Gentle into That Good Night" (poem by Dylan Thomas) (recited by John Lithgow, Ellen Burstyn, Casey Affleck, Jessica Chastain, Matthew McConaughey, and Mackenzie Foy)	1:37
13.	"No Time for Caution" (hidden track)	4:06
Total length:		60:14

=== Vinyl Edition (Standard) ===
Side A
No.	Title	Length
1.	"Dreaming Of the Crash"	3:50
2.	"Cornfield Chase"	2:05
3.	"Dust"	5:38
4.	"Day One"	3:16
5.	"Message From Home"	1:40

Side B
No.	Title	Length
6.	"Stay"	6:50
7.	"The Wormhole"	1:29
8.	"Afraid Of Time"	2:31
9.	"A Place Among The Stars"	3:27
10.	"No Time For Caution"	3:59

Side C
No.	Title	Length
11.	"Murph"	11:14
12.	"Detach"	6:38

Side D
No.	Title	Length
13.	"Running Out"	1:53
14.	"Tick-Tock"	8:12
15.	"Where We´re Going"	7:35
16.	"Do Not Go Gentle Into That Good Night"	1:28

=== MovieTickets.com bonus track ===
No.	Title	Length
1.	"Day One Dark"	6:58
Total length:		6:58

== Personnel ==
Credits adapted from CD liner notes.

All music composed by Hans Zimmer

- Producers: Christopher Nolan, Hans Zimmer, Alex Gibson
- Soundtrack album producers: Chris Craker, Hans Zimmer, Christopher Nolan
- Supervising music editor: Alex Gibson
- Music editor: Ryan Rubin
- Music consultant: Czarina Russell
- Sequencer programming: Andrew Kawczynski, Steve Mazzaro
- Music production services: Steven Kofsky
- Technical score engineer: Chuck Choi
- Technical score engineer: Stephanie McNally
- Technical assistants: Jacqueline Friedberg, Leland Cox
- Digital instrument design: Mark Wherry
- Supervising orchestrator: Bruce Fowler
- Orchestrators: Walt Fowler, Suzette Moriarty, Kevin Kaska, Carl Rydlund, Elizabeth Finch, Andrew Kinney
- Orchestra conducted by Gavin Greenaway, Richard Harvey
- Score recorded at Lyndhurst Hall, Air Studios and Temple Church, London
- Score recorded by Geoff Foster, Alan Meyerson
- Score mixed by Alan Meyerson
- Score mix assistant: John Witt Chapman
- Additional engineering: Christian Wenger, Seth Waldmann, Daniel Kresco
- Assistant to Hans Zimmer: Cynthia Park
- Studio manager for Remote Control Productions: Shalini Singh
- Contractor: Isobel Griffiths
- Sampling team: Ben Robinson, Taurees Habib, Raul Vega
- Music preparation: Booker T. White
- Music librarian: Jill Streater
- Score mixed at Remote Control Productions, Santa Monica, California

Air Studios sessions

- Air Studios bookings: Alison Burton Booth
- Reader: Chris Craker
- Pro Tools recordist at Lyndhurst Hall: Chris Barrett
- Pro Tools recordist in Studio 1: Laurence Anslow

Temple Church session

- Pro Tools recordist at Temple Church: John Prestage
- Assistant / Abbey Road Mobile: John Barrett
- Assistant / Abbey Road Mobile: Jon Alexander
- Technical engineer: Dan Cole
- Technical engineer: Matt Kingdon
- Booth reader: Steve Mazzaro
- Scoring session photography: Jordan Goldberg
- Executive in charge of music for Warner Bros. Pictures: Paul Broucek
- Executive in charge of music for Paramount Pictures: Randyspendlove
- Executive in charge of Watertower Music: Jason Linn
- Art direction and soundtrack coordination: Sandeep Sriram
- Music business affairs executive: Lisa Margolis

Featured musicians

- Ambient music design: Mario Reinsch
- Pipe organ: Roger Sayer
- Piano: Hans Zimmer
- Violin: Ann Marie Simpson
- Steel guitar: Chas Smith
- Tuned percussion: Frank Ricotti
- Harp: Skaila Kanga
- Synth programming: Hans Zimmer
- Leader of the firsts: Thomas Bowes
- Leader of the seconds: Roger Garland
- First cellist: Caroline Dale
- First French horn: Richard Watkins
- First viola: Peter Lale
- Bass: Mary Scully

Woodwinds

- Choir: London Voices
- Choirmasters: Ben Parry, Terry Edwards
- String quartet: Rita Manning, Emlyn Singleton, Bruce White, Tim Gill
- Piano quartet: Simon Chamberlain, Dave Arch, John Lenehan, Andy Vinter
- Flute 1: Karen Jones
- Flute / Piccolo 2: Helen Keen
- Flute / Piccolo 3: Paul Edmund-davies
- Flute / Piccolo / Alto 4: Anna Noakes
- Flute / Alto 5: Rowland Sutherland
- Flute / Alto 6: Siobhan Grealy
- Oboe 1: David Theodore
- Oboe 2: Matthew Draper
- Oboe / Cor anglais 3: Jane Marshall
- Oboe / Cor anglais 4: Janey Miller
- Clarinet 1: Nicholas Bucknall
- Clarinet 2: Nick Rodwell
- Clarinet/Bass clarinet – C extension 3: Martin Robertson
- Clarinet/Bass clarinet – C extension 4: Duncan Ashby
- Clarinet/E♭ contrabass clarinet 5: Dave Fuest
- Clarinet/B♭ contrabass clarinet 6: Alan Andrews
- Bassoon 1: Richard Skinner
- Bassoon 2: Lorna West
- Bassoon/Contrabassoon 3: Rachel Simms
- Bassoon/Contrabassoon 4: Gordon Laing

== Charts ==
=== Weekly charts ===
Chart (2014–2025)	Peak position
Australian Albums (ARIA)	82
Belgian Albums (Ultratop Flanders)	30
Belgian Albums (Ultratop Wallonia)	53
Dutch Albums (Album Top 100)	66
French Albums (SNEP)	41
German Albums (Offizielle Top 100)	45
Hungarian Physical Albums (MAHASZ)	33
South Korean Albums (Circle)	14
South Korean International Albums (Circle)	1
Spanish Albums (Promusicae)	49
Swiss Albums (Schweizer Hitparade)	32
US Billboard 200	20
US Soundtrack Albums (Billboard)	4

=== Year-end charts ===
Chart (2015)	Position
US Soundtrack Albums (Billboard)	21

== Certifications ==
Region	Certification	Certified units/sales
Denmark (IFPI Danmark)	Gold	10,000^{‡}
United Kingdom (BPI)	Gold	100,000^{‡}
^{‡} Sales+streaming figures based on certification alone.

Certifications and sales for "Cornfield Chase"
Region	Certification	Certified units/sales
United Kingdom (BPI)	Gold	400,000^{‡}
United States (RIAA)	Gold	500,000^{‡}
^{‡} Sales+streaming figures based on certification alone.
