= Thomas William Edmondson =

American mathematician (1869–1938)

- Born: June 26, 1869; Skipton-in-Craven, Yorkshire, England
- Died: November 5, 1938 (aged 69); Mount Vernon, New York, U.S.
- Education: University of London (BA); University of Cambridge (BA); Clark University (PhD)
- Occupations: Educator; mathematician; physicist; botanist; writer
- Years active: 1896–1934
- Spouse: Minnie Ramsden (m. 1896)

Thomas William Edmondson (June 26, 1869 – November 5, 1938) was an American mathematician. He was a physics and mathematics professor at New York University from 1896 to his retirement in 1934.

== Early life ==
Thomas William Edmondson was born on June 26, 1869, in Skipton-in-Craven, Yorkshire, England, to Sarah (née Dodgson) and Thomas Edmondson Sr. His father was a printer and publisher.

Edmondson attended elementary school in Skipton. He attended Skipton Grammar School and was a head boy. He graduated from the University of London with a Bachelor of Arts in 1888. He received the Ackroyd Scholarship and attended the University of Cambridge. In 1891, he graduated from Cambridge with a Bachelor of Arts and received the 18th wrangler mark in the Mathematical Tripos. He then worked as an assistant tutor in mathematics and physics at Cambridge's University Correspondence College. In 1893, he left England for America. He graduated from Clark University with a Doctor of Philosophy in 1896.

== Career ==
In 1896, Edmondson joined New York University as an assistant professor of physics. He worked alongside Daniel W. Hering. He also assisted Pomeroy Ladue in the mathematics department. In 1903, he became an assistant professor of mathematics. He took over as head of the mathematics department following Ladue's retirement in 1906. He remained as department head until his retirement on August 31, 1934. He was acting dean of the New York University graduate school from 1916 to 1921. He was secretary of the faculty committee of the university council from 1903 to 1933. He was chairman of the Washington Square Collegiate Division in 1913. He also served as college bursar, treasurer of the athletic association, and was a member of the Beta chapter of Phi Beta Kappa.

Edmondson was a member of the American Mathematical Society, the American Mathematical Association, the American Association of University Professors, and the English Place-Name Society. He was a member of the Craven Naturalists and Scientific Association.

== Personal life ==
Edmondson married Minnie Ramsden of Perth, Ontario, in 1896. They had no children. He lived on Franklin Avenue in Mount Vernon, New York. He attended the First Baptist Church in Mount Vernon. His hobbies included botany and archaeological research.

Edmondson died on November 4, 1938, at Mount Vernon Hospital.

== Works ==
Edmondson wrote books on topics, including spark discharge in dielectrics; potential, spherical harmonic analysis; and on curves and elliptic functions.

His publications included:

- Worked Examples in Coördinate Geometry (1891)
- Mensuration and Spherical Geometry (1893), with W. Briggs
- Deductions in Euclid (1901)
