= Roger Sayer =

English organist

Roger Sayer is an English organist and was Director of Music at the Temple Church in central London until 2023. He was previously Organist and Director of Music at Rochester Cathedral.

Sayer began his musical career as a chorister in Portsmouth and then studied at the Royal College of Music under Nicholas Danby. Between 1980 and 1984 he was an organ student at St. Paul's Cathedral, London, and was appointed organist of Woodford Parish Church in 1981. In 1989 he was appointed Assistant Organist at Rochester Cathedral and was promoted to Organist and Director of Music in 1994. He was appointed Organist & Director of Music at the Temple Church in 2013, replacing James Vivian.

During his tenure at Rochester, he presented the programme known as The Great Organ Works, playing a series of monthly concerts, including the complete organ works of J.S. Bach over the course of 2005. He cofounded the Midas Touch Organ Duo with Charles Andrews, with whom he has performed concerts on both sides of the Atlantic. Their repertoire includes transcriptions of James Bond theme tunes. In November 2012 they premiered a new organ sonata commissioned from David Briggs.

Sayer's most well known recording to date is as organist on Hans Zimmer's soundtrack for Christopher Nolan's 2014 film Interstellar. Sayer collaborated directly with Zimmer and Nolan as elements of the score were crafted around possibilities offered by the organ at Temple Church.

Cultural offices
Preceded by Barry Ferguson	Organist and Master of the Choristers of Rochester Cathedral; 1994–2008	Succeeded by Scott Farrell
