= Ermysted's Grammar School =

Ermysted’s Grammar School
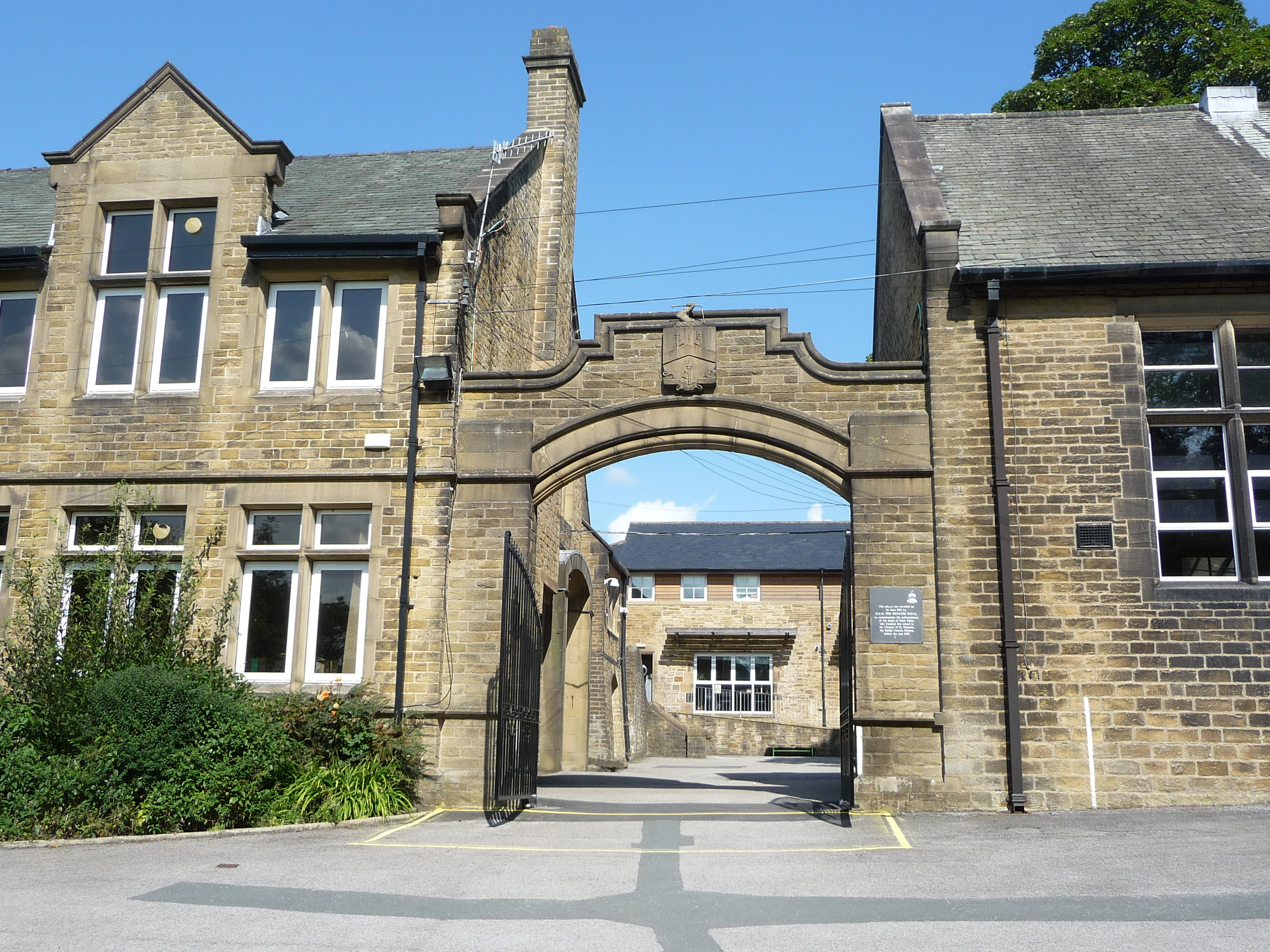
- School arms Ermysted's Grammar School, selective boys' Grammar School

Location
- Gargrave Road; Skipton, North Yorkshire, BD23 1PL; England; 53.9634°N 2.0227°W

Information
- Type: 11–18 boys Voluntary aided grammar school
- Motto: French: Suivez La Raison (Follow the truth)
- Established: 1492; 534 years ago
- Founders: Peter Toller, William Ermysted
- Local authority: North Yorkshire Council
- Department for Education URN: 121716 Tables
- Ofsted: Reports
- Headmaster: Michael Evans
- Staff: 50
- Gender: Boys
- Age range: 11-18
- Enrolment: 791
- Houses: Toller; Ermysted; Hartley; Petyt
- Colour
- Publication: Chronicles of Ermysted's; The Reason
- Alumni: Old Ermystedians
- School capacity: 896
- Website: www.ermysteds.uk

Ermysted's Grammar School is an 11-18 boys' voluntary aided grammar school in Skipton, North Yorkshire, England.

It was founded by Peter Toller in the 15th century and is the seventh oldest state school in Britain. The first official record of the school was seen in Peter Toller's will in 1492; the school records its establishment as the same year, though its history could possibly be dated to 1468. The school operates a house system. The four houses — Toller, Ermysted, Petyt, and Hartley — are named after key figures in the school's history; when the school operated a boarding house, its boarders were members of School House.

There are 840 currently enrolled students. The Sixth Form is formed from boys graduating Key Stage 4, as well as 20 additional boys. The current headmaster is Michael Evans; his predecessor, Graham Hamilton, retired at the end of the 2015-2016 school year.

== History ==
=== Establishment ===
In 1492, Peter Toller's will confirmed he had already founded a school in his chantry of St Nicholas in the parish church; the school takes this as its founding date. In 1548, Edward VI's government took over all chantry lands. William Ermysted re-founded the school with new lands and moved it to what is now the Old Grammar School at the bottom of Shortbank Road. In 1707 and 1719, the wills of Old Boys William and Sylvester Petyt made bequests to the school, and enabled the foundation of the Petyt Library and Petyt Trust. The Leeds and Liverpool Canal reached Skipton in 1773, partly built on EGS land.

=== Nineteenth-century building ===
In 1875, the Gargrave Road building was begun to accommodate 50 day boys and 50 boarders; and, from 1876 to 1907, Mr E. T. Hartley served as headmaster of the new school. In 1882, the Pool and the Old Gym (now I.C.T., music and R.S. rooms) begun, and in 1895 the Science block was built (now A.P.L. and staff quiet room).

=== Twentieth century ===
The school has two memorials to the two World Wars. The First World War memorial library was set up by the Old Boys' Society (now the Governors' Board Room) in 1924, and in 1959 the Memorial Hall was opened to those lost in the Second World War. The school opened the 'new buildings' in 1933 (now classrooms) and closed its doors to boarding pupils in 1989. The school celebrated the Quincentenary of the school's founding in 1992, which included a visit by H.R.H. The Princess Royal, a pageant, and a new commemorative sports hall.

== Overview ==
=== Academic attainment ===
In 2008, it was reported that the school achieved the best Yorkshire state-school A-level exam results, and in 2007 the school came 76th in the top 100 UK schools in terms of Oxbridge admissions.

=== Current buildings ===
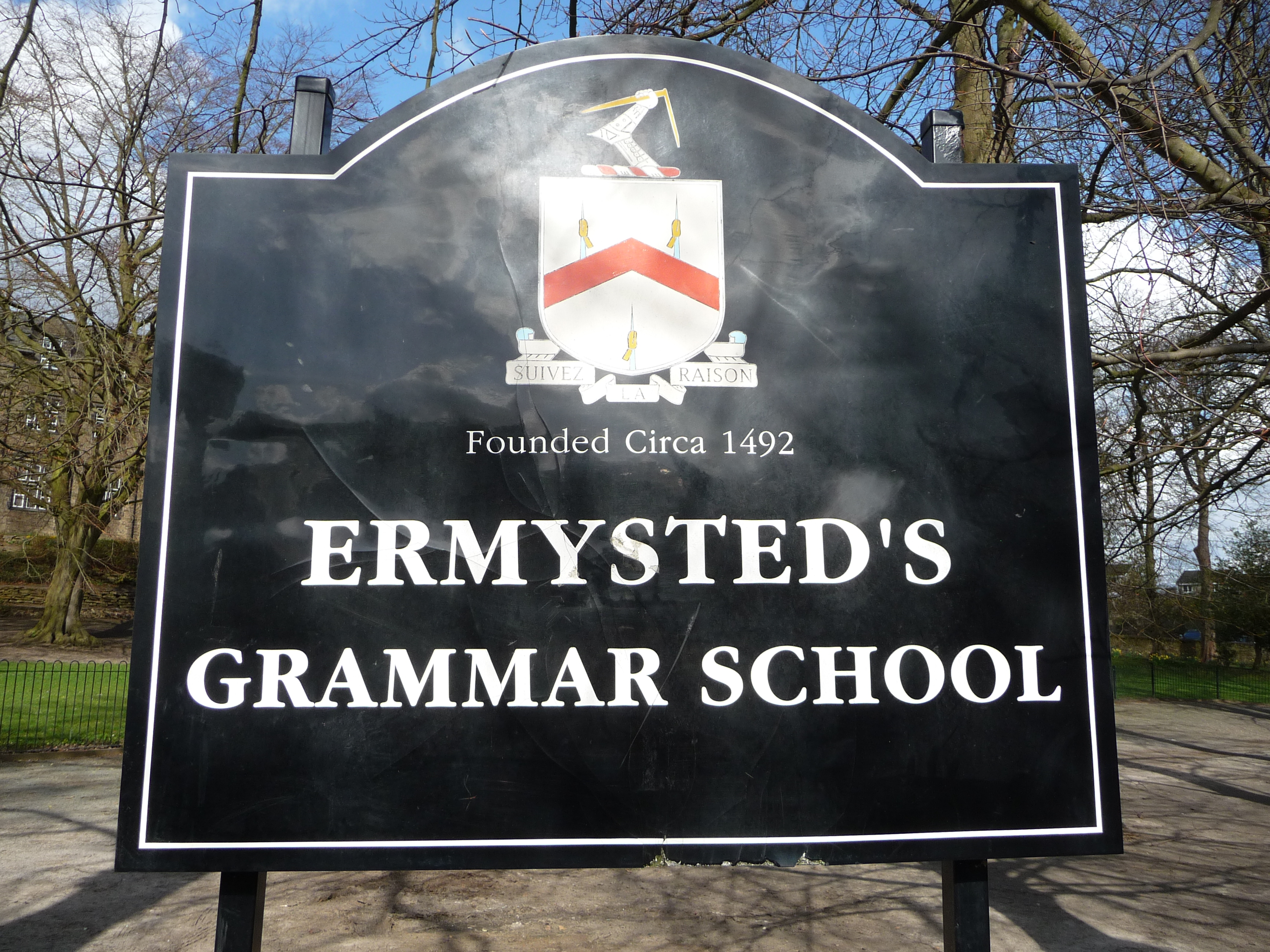
School signage approaching the school building

The school is now situated between Gargrave Road and Grassington Road, although the sixteenth-century school house can still be seen on Shortbank Road. The majority of buildings date from the 19th and early 20th centuries, although many newer buildings now exist. The latter include the sports hall, opened in 1992 to commemorate the school's 500th anniversary; the £7 million Refectory development north of the main site; the English Block, which houses the school's CDT and English departments, in addition to one of four ICT facilities; and a sixth-form centre, built in 2016.

=== Ofsted inspections ===
In the 2000 Ofsted inspection, the school's results were "very high" against the national average, especially upon entry, where Year 7s (age 11/12) work to a level "expected of pupils aged 14". An "outstanding" Sixth Form with a wide range of subjects was noted. The school was considered "very successful" at allowing pupils to reach high academic standards, and the quality of teaching is "good".

In the 2005 Ofsted inspection, the Sixth Form was described as "outstanding" and achieved Grade 1 Outstanding in every category of assessment.

In the 22 October 2008 Ofsted inspection, the school received an "outstanding" verdict overall. Seven out of eight areas were given an outstanding verdict.

In the September 2022 Ofsted inspection, the school was rated "good" overall. Four of the five areas were given an outstanding verdict, with quality of education the only area achieving "good". According to the report, teachers should ensure Key Stage 3 students are secure in their knowledge before moving on to new content. Sixth Form provision is rated "outstanding" with lessons having a professional atmosphere, allowing for high-quality debate and discussion. The partnership with Skipton Girls' High School to expand the number of A-Level options is described as "valuable", while GCSE outcomes across all subject areas are "very positive" for pupils.

=== School publication ===
The Chronicles of Ermysted's is the official annual school magazine, containing details of school events, student visits, results, and school activities, although in recent years its publication has been somewhat hit-and-miss. The school also publishes a termly newspaper edited by students called The Reason. Named after the school's motto it is fully funded through adverts from local businesses and sales. Furthermore, the paper is written and edited by students. The Reason is one of the most successful school student newspapers in the country, having won 11 and been highly commended for 21 awards at the national Shine School Media Awards 2019-2025. This includes winning three 'Best Newspaper' awards in 2019, 2022, and 2023, and winning 'Best Podcast' in 2020.

=== Sport ===
Rugby Kit
Football Kit

The school competes in rugby union, cross country running, orienteering, cricket, and football tournaments. Occurring annually in the summer term is Sports Day, during which students compete at athletics.

== Notable alumni ==
- Simon Beaufoy, Writer of Oscar-winning film The Full Monty and the Oscar-winning Slumdog Millionaire (for which he received both a BAFTA and an Oscar for Best Adapted Screenplay)
- Herbie Farnworth, rugby league player
- William Harbutt Dawson, author (1860–1948)
- Thomas William Edmondson (1869–1938), American mathematician
- Prof. John Desmond Hargreaves, historian
- Rev. Eric William Heaton, Pro Vice Chancellor Oxford University (1920–1996)
- William Nicholas Hitchon, nuclear fusion scientist and participant on Up (film series)
- Andrew Hodgson, former Bradford Bulls rugby league player
- Richard Holden of the Conservative and Unionist Party, MP for North West Durham Elected 2019
- Rick Holden, former Manchester City player and former Barnsley FC Assistant Manager
- Geoffrey Horne author of the Sergeant Cluff series between 1960 and 1978
- Jonathan Linsley, actor (Last of the Summer Wine, Pirates of the Caribbean)
- Iain Macleod, Conservative MP for Enfield West from 1950–70 and former Chancellor of the Exchequer in 1970
- Robin Marshall, physicist
- Chris Mason (born 1980), BBC journalist
- Blake Morrison, poet and author
- Paul Zenon, comedian and magician

== See also ==
- List of the oldest schools in the United Kingdom
- Listed buildings in Skipton
