= Joseph Robinson (priest) =

Anglican priest

Joseph Robinson FKC (23 February 1927 – 21 June 1999) was an English Anglican priest, most notably Master of the Temple from 1981 until 1999.

Robinson was educated at Upholland Grammar School, King's College London and St Boniface College, Warminster. He was ordained deacon in 1952 and priest in 1953. After a curacy at All Hallows' Church, Tottenham he was a Minor Canon and Sacrist of St Paul's Cathedral. As Sacrist he both organized and sang the state funeral service for Winston Churchill at St. Paul's on 30 January 1965. He was a Lecturer in Hebrew and Old Testament Studies at King's and personally tutored Desmond Tutu. From 1968 he was Canon Residentiary and Treasurer at Canterbury Cathedral until his appointment as Master of the Temple. In 1977, as Parish Clerk to Christ Church Greyfriars (Newgate Street), he served as Master of the Worshipful Company of Parish Clerks.

== Published works ==
=== Books ===
- 1972: 'The First Book of Kings.' (The Cambridge Bible Commentaries on the Old Testament) Cambridge: at the University Press ISBN 9780521097345
- 1976: 'The Second Book of Kings.' (The Cambridge Bible Commentaries on the Old Testament) Cambridge: at the University Press ISBN 9780521097741

=== Guides etc. ===
- 1971 A Christian understanding of the Old Testament: St Paul's Lecture [London]: [Council for Christian-Jewish Understanding] OCLC 236436
- 1973 'Pictures in Glass: Canterbury Cathedral' Canterbury: Cathedral Gifts OCLC 759064548
- 1978 'Canterbury Cathedral: walk-round guide' London: Pitkin Pictorials ISBN 0853722064 OCLC 318564874
- 1983 'Canterbury Cathedral – Past & Present' Canterbury: Cathedral Gifts ISBN 978-0906211144 OCLC 16836856
- 1997 'The Temple Church' Pitkin Guide. Norwich: Jarrold Publishing ISBN 0853728526 OCLC 863447651
