= Kung Fu Panda 4 (soundtrack) =

2024 soundtrack album

Kung Fu Panda 4 (Original Motion Picture Soundtrack)

Soundtrack album by Hans Zimmer and Steve Mazzaro
- Released: March 8, 2024
- Recorded: 2023–2024
- Genre: Feature film soundtrack
- Length: 48:25
- Label: Back Lot Music
- Producers: Hans Zimmer; Steve Mazzaro

Hans Zimmer chronology
Dune: Part Two (2024)	Kung Fu Panda 4 (2024)	Mufasa: The Lion King (2024)

Steve Mazzaro chronology
The Calling (2022)	Kung Fu Panda 4 (2024)

Kung Fu Panda 4 (Original Motion Picture Soundtrack) is the soundtrack to the 2024 DreamWorks Animation film Kung Fu Panda 4. The fourth instalment in the Kung Fu Panda franchise and the sequel to Kung Fu Panda 3 (2016), it features musical score composed jointly by Hans Zimmer and Steve Mazzaro and the soundtrack released day-and-date with the film on March 8, 2024 through Back Lot Music label.

== Development ==
Hans Zimmer returned to score music for Kung Fu Panda 4 after doing the same for the predecessors; his protégé Steve Mazzaro also served as a co-composer of the film; the duo had previously worked together in The Amazing Spider-Man 2 (2014), The Boss Baby (2017), The SpongeBob Movie: Sponge on the Run (2020), The Boss Baby: Family Business and Army of Thieves (2021). Like the predecessors, Zimmer and Mazzaro used Chinese instruments for the score to provide authenticity as well as blending it with pop songs. Zimmer employed an 80-piece orchestra for recording the film score. The rock duo Tenacious D covered the 1998 single "...Baby One More Time" by Britney Spears for the film. According to Jack Black, who is part of Tenacious D and voiced the titular role of Po, he wanted the song in particular "because it's kind of in the vein of kung fu". The soundtrack was released under the Back Lot Music label on March 8, 2024.

== Track listing ==
No.	Title	Writer(s)	Artist	Length
1.	"Journey"	Zimmer; Mazzaro; John Powell		01:52
2.	"Opening Day"	Zimmer; Mazzaro; Powell		02:59
3.	"Tai Lung Has Returned"	Zimmer; Mazzaro; Powell		01:53
4.	"No Footprint Too Small"	Zimmer; Mazzaro; Powell		02:12
5.	"Juniper City"			01:29
6.	"A Den of Thieves"			00:53
7.	"The Happy Bunny Tavern"			02:07
8.	"Tavern Fight"	Zimmer; Mazzaro; Powell		01:29
9.	"Looking for Po"	Zimmer; Mazzaro; Powell		02:09
10.	"She Could Be Anyone"			02:45
11.	"Sharing Stories"	Zimmer; Mazzaro; Powell		01:49
12.	"Teach Me Your Kung Fu"	Zimmer; Mazzaro; Powell		02:58
13.	"A Different Path"			03:12
14.	"Who Are You Rooting For"			02:40
15.	"I Am The Dragon Warrior"			02:24
16.	"You're Our Son"			01:34
17.	"My Master Plan"			01:12
18.	"Be the Pit"	Zimmer; Mazzaro; Powell		02:40
19.	"It's Pronounced Skadoosh"	Zimmer; Mazzaro; Powell		02:31
20.	"Inner Peace"			02:23
21.	"Crazy Train"	Bob Daisley; Ozzy Osbourne; Randy Rhoads		02:05
22.	"...Baby One More Time"	Max Martin	Tenacious D	03:13
Total length:				48:25

== Reception ==
Filmtracks reviewed "the music for Kung Fu Panda 4 is completely sufficient but largely forgettable, the franchise and its music contentedly on auto-pilot." Tim Grierson of Screen International wrote that Zimmer and Mazzaro's "fiery percussive score lends the proceedings a mythic grandeur". Alessandro M. M. Drake of The Harvard Crimson wrote "The soundtrack is another highlight, with Hans Zimmer continuing his epic musical legacy. Its best moments are a rendition of “Crazy Train” on traditional Chinese instruments, and a Tenacious D cover of Britney Spears’ “...Baby One More Time,” with Jack Black absolutely smashing the upbeat vocals." Pete Hammond of Deadline Hollywood described the score as "great", while Ethan Anderton of /Film called it as "stellar".
