= The Creator (soundtrack) =

The Creator (Original Motion Picture Soundtrack)

Film score by Hans Zimmer
- Released: September 29, 2023
- Recorded: 2023
- Genre: Film score
- Length: 43:48
- Label: Hollywood
- Producer: Hans Zimmer

Hans Zimmer chronology
Are You There God? It's Me, Margaret. (2023)	The Creator (2023)	Dune: Part Two (2024)

The Creator (Original Motion Picture Soundtrack) is the soundtrack to the 2023 film of the same name directed by Gareth Edwards. Featuring 12 tracks from the film's score composed and arranged by Hans Zimmer, the album was released by Hollywood Records alongside the film on September 29, 2023.

== Development ==
In July 2023, Edwards confirmed that Hans Zimmer would score music for the film. In an interview to Collider, Edwards assembled a collection of 25 most played tracks from the crew members, and 14 of them belonged to Zimmer, he decided for his inclusion in the film. Joe Walker who worked on the editing of Dune managed to contact Zimmer, through which Edwards—who was in Thailand to meet the head of the military to grant permission for filming a sequence in Black Hawks—contacted him through a video chat on Zoom. During their conversation, Zimmer shared his anecdotes about The Dark Knight score and his contributions to Terrence Malick's films. Later, Edwards showed a test sequence which he did for the producers, which led him to be on board. Some of the cues he composed were debuted at the featurette that showcased at the Hall H in San Diego Comic-Con.

In a September 2023 interview with MIT Technology Review, Edwards revealed that he initially planned on having a company specializing in AI-generated music replicate Zimmer's style of film score. The company provided him with a result that he graded a "7 out of 10", but decided to have Zimmer himself score the film instead, who found the original AI test track "amusing." Henry Ajder, an expert in generative AI, felt that in the early days of AI-generated music, simpler tones are "pretty convincing", which would be difficult to compare with human compositions. However, he found that a longer piece in Zimmer's style of music is "significantly more complex to generate" than a simpler piano melody as "AI systems are limited by what is in their training data, whereas human Zimmer has his imagination and the whole surrounding world to draw inspiration from."

== Track listing ==
The Creator (Original Motion Picture Soundtrack)
No.	Title	Length
1.	"They're Not People"	2:19
2.	"A Place in the Sky"	2:25
3.	"Where It All Began"	4:11
4.	"Surrounded"	2:34
5.	"She's Not Real"	2:13
6.	"Standby"	6:12
7.	"Missile Launch"	3:01
8.	"Prayer"	2:47
9.	"The Wounded"	3:08
10.	"Lab Raid"	4:31
11.	"Heaven"	6:57
12.	"True Love"	3:30
Total length:		43:48

== Additional music ==
Other songs featured in the film include:

- "Fly Me To The Moon (In Other Words)" – written by Bart Howard; performed by Astrud Gilberto
- "Evergood" – written and performed by Berl Olswanger
- "Pan De Azucar" – written by Nora Orlandi; performed by Nora Orlandi
- "Clair de Lune" – written by Claude Debussy; performed by Eric Hachikian
- "Len's Sinker" – written and performed by the Rondels
- "Everything in Its Right Place" – written and performed by Radiohead
- "Into the Wind" – written and performed by Eric Hachikian
- "Child in Time" – written and performed by Deep Purple
- "Who Shot the Cannon" – written and performed by Sherwin Linton
- "Flight of the Rat" – written and performed by Deep Purple
- "Love is Shining" – written and performed by Aeryth
- "La-La in the Machine" – written and performed by Stephanie Olmanni
- "Counting Song" – written and performed by Stephanie Olmanni
- "NAINAINAI" – written by yonkey; performed by Atarashii Gakko!
- "Hold Your Head Up" – written by Rod Argent and Chris White; performed by the Bats
- "Kasih Suci" – written by Carel Simon; performed by Golden Wing
- "Hanny" – written by Adhi Mantra; performed by Golden Wing
- "Love I Need You" – written by Dale McBride and Fran Powers; performed by Dale McBride
- "Hari Yang Mulya" – written by Adhi Mantra; performed by Golden Wing
- "Lover's Lane" – written and performed by Boris Gardiner

== Reception ==
Filmtracks.com wrote "For a somewhat short, score-only album of 44 minutes in length, the 12 minutes in that trio of highlight cues will easily carry the day for all of humanity in ways that Edwards' ridiculous noodling with artificial intelligence will struggle to accomplish." James Southall of Movie Wave commented it as "a straightforward dramatic film score which does what a good dramatic film score should do – adds to the film and when it goes big on emotion it's really earned the right to do so." Music critic Jonathan Broxton wrote "The Creator is a really, really good score, which successfully blends some of Zimmer's more modern science fiction sensibilities with the evocative Asian sound of scores like Beyond Rangoon, and builds up to a powerful, emotional finale that really stirs the soul."

Fionnuala Halligan of Screen International said that Zimmer "delivers an appropriate score". David Rooney of The Hollywood Reporter wrote that the "soaring choral passages" of Zimmer's score enhances Edwards' "sophisticated world-building skills" and "philosophical platitudes". Clint Worthington of Consequence wrote "Hans Zimmer's score is appropriately booming and Zimmeresque, though it doesn't quite escape the wall-of-sound feel of many of his previous blockbuster works." Pete Hammond of Deadline Hollywood wrote "Hans Zimmer did the music score and it not only matches the ever-changing action perfectly, but ranks with the very best of this veteran composer." Mireia Mullor of Digital Spy said that Zimmer's "commanding score is incredibly moving, enough to make audiences leave the cinema stunned".

However, David Ehrlich of IndieWire criticised Zimmer's score as he felt that the Radiohead album Kid A (2000) "can do more for a story about the next iteration of 'human' life than any of the tracks". Chris Bumbray of JoBlo.com wrote "the Hans Zimmer score isn't given enough of a focus in the movie's first half, with Edwards using a few too many needle drops."

== Personnel ==
Credits adapted from production notes:

- All music composed, arranged and programmed by – Hans Zimmer
- Featured vocalist – Stephanie Olmanni
- Pitched percussion – Aleksandra Suklar
- Woodwinds – Pedro Eustache
- Cello – Tina Guo
- Synths – Matt Bowdler, Kevin Schroeder
- Music clearance and legal services – Christine Bergren, Julie Butchko
- Music production services – Steven Kofsky
- Score recorded at AIR Studios, London
- Score recordist – Geoff Foster
- Score engineer – Chuck Choi
- Music editors – Ryan Rubin, Graeme Stewart, Nevin Seus
- Temp music editor – Georgie Ramsland
- Score editor – Chris Barrett
- Score mixed at Remote Control Productions, Santa Monica, California
- Score mixer – Alan Meyerson
- Score mixing assistant – Jacob Johnston
- Additional music and score production – Steve Mazzaro
- Orchestration and music preparation – Oscar Senén
- Orchestra contractor – Isobel Griffiths
- Orchestra conductor – Gavin Greenaway
- Choir conductor – Ben Parry
- Librarian – Jill Streater Synth
- Score technical assistant – Alejandro Moros
- Digital instrument design – Mark Wherry
- Studio manager – Jessica Gibson
- Assistant to Hans Zimmer – Cynthia Park
