= Dune: Part Two (soundtrack) =

2024 soundtrack album by Hans Zimmer

Dune: Part Two (Original Motion Picture Soundtrack)

Soundtrack album by Hans Zimmer
- Released: February 23, 2024
- Genre: Film score
- Length: 81:02
- Label: WaterTower
- Producer: Hans Zimmer

Hans Zimmer film score chronology
The Creator (Original Motion Picture Soundtrack) (2023)	Dune: Part Two (Original Motion Picture Soundtrack) (2024)	Kung Fu Panda 4 (Original Motion Picture Soundtrack) (2024)

Singles from Dune: Part Two (Original Motion Picture Soundtrack)
- 1. "A Time of Quiet Between the Storms" Released: February 15, 2024; 2. "Harvester Attack" Released: February 15, 2024

Dune: Part Two (Original Motion Picture Soundtrack) is the soundtrack album composed and arranged by Hans Zimmer for the 2024 film Dune: Part Two by Denis Villeneuve. It was released by WaterTower Music on February 23, 2024, one week before the film's theatrical release in the United States.

== Background ==
Composer Hans Zimmer had previously scored director Denis Villeneuve's 2021 film Dune, for which he received the Academy Award for Best Original Score in 2022. He had been a fan of the novel in his teenage years, and chose to score the first film over Christopher Nolan's Tenet.

== Production ==
After scoring the first film, Zimmer continued writing music in anticipation for its sequel.

I never left the world of Dune. In fact, I think Denis [Villeneuve] thought I was quite mad, because I kept writing after we finished the first movie. But because I knew the story, I knew the book, I knew what was coming our way. And in fact, a lot of the main themes in this second movie were written at the end of the first film, before Denis started shooting. It felt important to carry on writing when we were still in the same spirit, the same frame of mind.

— Hans Zimmer

== Release ==
Ahead of the soundtrack's release, WaterTower Music released two singles on February 15, 2024: "A Time of Quiet Between the Storms" and "Harvester Attack".

== Critical reception ==
Brian Tallerico of RogerEbert.com wrote, "Hans Zimmer's Oscar-winning score felt a bit overdone to me in the first film, but he smartly differentiates the cultures here, finding more metallic sounds for the cold Harkonnens to balance against the heated score for the Fremen."

== Accolades ==
Dune: Part Two (Original Motion Picture Soundtrack) awards and nominations
Award	Year (Note: Indicates the year of ceremony. Each year is linked to the article about the awards held that year, wherever possible.)	Category	Recipients	Result	Ref.
Astra Creative Arts Awards	2024	Best Original Score	Hans Zimmer	Nominated	
Critics' Choice Movie Awards	2025	Best Score	Hans Zimmer	Nominated	
Golden Globe Awards	2025	Best Original Score	Hans Zimmer	Nominated	
Grammy Awards	2025	Best Score Soundtrack For Visual Media	Hans Zimmer	Won	
Hollywood Music in Media Awards	2024	Best Original Score in a Sci-Fi/Fantasy Film	Hans Zimmer	Won	
NAACP Image Awards	2025	Outstanding Original Score for TV/Film	Hans Zimmer	Nominated	

== Track listing ==
All tracks are written by Hans Zimmer.

Dune: Part Two (Original Motion Picture Soundtrack) track listing
No.	Title	Length
1.	"Beginnings Are Such Delicate Times"	8:56
2.	"Eclipse"	5:13
3.	"The Sietch"	2:34
4.	"Water of Life"	3:06
5.	"A Time of Quiet Between the Storms"	4:21
6.	"Harvester Attack"	3:40
7.	"Worm Ride"	2:19
8.	"Ornithopter Attack"	2:10
9.	"Each Man Is a Little War"	1:21
10.	"Harkonnen Arena"	5:22
11.	"Spice"	0:37
12.	"Seduction"	2:02
13.	"Never Lose Me"	1:16
14.	"Travel South"	1:10
15.	"Paul Drinks"	1:47
16.	"Resurrection"	2:16
17.	"Arrival"	1:40
18.	"Southern Messiah"	5:22
19.	"The Emperor"	1:38
20.	"Worm Army"	3:33
21.	"Gurney Battle"	2:25
22.	"You Fought Well"	1:42
23.	"Kiss the Ring"	3:12
24.	"Only I Will Remain"	6:44
25.	"Lisan al Gaib"	6:36
Total length:		81:02

== Personnel ==
=== Musicians ===
- Hans Zimmer – synthesizer programming
- Jake Boring – additional programming
- Pipers of the Scottish Session Orchestra – bagpipes
- Ben Parry – choir conductor
- Pedro Eustache – Armenian duduk, woodwinds, solo flute
- Juan Garcia-Herreros – electric bass, solo double bass
- Mariko Muranaka – electric cello
- Tina Guo – electric cello
- Guthrie Govan – electric guitar
- Molly Rogers – electric violin, viola, violin, vocals
- Loire Cotler – featured vocals
- Joan Martorell – orchestration
- Nacho Cantalejo – orchestration
- Òscar Senén – orchestration
- Aicha Djidjelli – percussion
- Aleksandra Suklar – percussion
- Buzz Allan – percussion
- Holly Madge – percussion
- David Fleming – vocals
- Edie Lehmann Boddicker – vocals
- Judith Sephuma – vocals
- Lisa Gerrard – vocals
- Michael Geiger – vocals
- Stephanie Olmanni – vocals
- Steven Doar – vocals
- Suzanne Waters – vocals

=== Technical ===
- Hans Zimmer – production
- Stephen Lipson – additional production
- Gavin Lurssen – mastering
- Reuben Cohen – mastering
- Alan Meyerson – mixing
- Clint Bennett – music editing
- Joe E. Rand – music editing
- Ryan Rubin – music editing
- Calum Minuti-Goold – sound design
- Christian Henson – sound design
- Christophe Duquesne – sound design
- Edmund Eagan – sound design
- Evyn Deboer – sound design
- Guillaume Bonneau – sound design
- Howard Scarr – sound design
- Jeremy Katz – sound design
- Kevin Schroeder – sound design
- Mark Wherry – sound design
- Raul Vega – sound design
- Taurees Habib – sound design
- Chuck Choi – technical engineering
- Eva Reistad – additional mixing, additional engineering
- Colby Donaldson – additional engineering
- Isabel Gracefield – additional engineering
- Kostadin Kamcev – additional engineering
- Nolan Bacardi – additional engineering
- Simon Bowley – additional engineering
- Soya Soo – additional engineering
- Jacob Johnston – mixing assistance
- Walter Kang – mixing assistance
- Alejandro Moros – technical assistance
- Matt Wood – technical assistance

== Charts ==
Chart performance for Dune: Part Two (Original Motion Picture Soundtrack
Chart (2024)	Peak position
Australian Vinyl Albums (ARIA)	5
Austrian Albums (Ö3 Austria)	34
Belgian Albums (Ultratop Flanders)	26
Belgian Albums (Ultratop Wallonia)	65
French Albums (SNEP)	90
German Albums (Offizielle Top 100)	82
Portuguese Albums (AFP)	147
Scottish Albums (Official Charts)	20
Swiss Albums (Schweizer Hitparade)	29
UK Independent Albums (Official Charts)	5
UK Soundtrack Albums (Official Charts)	1

== Release history ==
Release history and formats for Dune: Part Two (Original Motion Picture Soundtrack)
Region	Date	Format(s)	Label(s)	Ref.
Various	February 23, 2024	Digital download; streaming	WaterTower Music	
Various	May 24, 2024	CD; LP	WaterTower Music	
