= John Firth (cricketer) =

English cricketer and clergyman

J. D. E. Firth

John D'Ewes Evelyn Firth (21 February 1900 – 21 September 1957) was a schoolboy cricketer at Winchester College during the First World War. He studied at the University of Oxford (Christ Church College). He went on to become a Church of England clergyman.

== Early life ==
He was born in Nottingham, the son of John Benjamin Firth and his wife Helena Gertrude.

== Cricketer ==
A leg-break and googly bowler, Firth took all 10 wickets for 41 runs in a match against Eton College in 1917 and was named as a Wisden Cricketer of the Year among a selection of five public school bowlers in the 1918 almanack, there being no first-class cricket to report on. In a first-class career of just four matches, Firth played twice for Oxford University and twice for Nottinghamshire.

== Career ==
Firth became a schoolmaster and chaplain at Winchester College and wrote several books about the school, where his nickname was "Budge" Firth. He later became Master of the Temple and was canon emeritus of Winchester Cathedral at the time of his death, which occurred in Winchester at age 57.

Firth wrote the biography of Montague Rendall (1862–1950), former Headmaster of Winchester College.
