= Harold Anson =

English cleric

Anson in February 1935.

Harold Anson (1867 – 1954), was an English Anglican priest, most notably Master of the Temple from 1935 until his death.

== Notes ==
The eleventh child of Rev. Frederick Anson, Canon of Windsor, and Caroline, eldest daughter of George Venables-Vernon, 5th Baron Vernon. He was born in Sudbury for which he retained great affection, educated at Clifton College and Christ Church, Oxford. He was ordained deacon in 1890 and priest in 1891. After a curacy in St Pancras he held incumbencies at Whitton and Hāwera. He was Warden of St John's College, Auckland from 1902 until 1905; Rector of Badsworth, 1906–10; of Birch-in-Rusholme; of Primrose Hill, 1919–22; St Martin in the Fields, 1922–28; and Vicar of Tandridge, 1928–35 (Rural Dean of Godstone, 1930–35).
