= William Ermested =

English cleric

William Ermested (died 31 October 1558) was an English cleric, Canon of Windsor from 1554 to 1558, and Master of the Temple in London.

Having previously graduated M.A. at a university abroad, Ermested was incorporated at Oxford on 12 December 1527, and graduated B.D. on 12 December 1527, later advancing to D.D.

== Career ==
He was appointed:

- Rector of Fryerning, Essex, 1533
- Vicar of Birstall, West Yorkshire, 1535
- Rector of Adel, West Yorkshire, 1536
- Prebendary of Neasden at St Paul's Cathedral, 1539–1558
- Rector of Kislingbury, Northamptonshire, 1542–1558
- Vicar of All Saints' Church, Northampton, 1545–1550
- Master of the Temple

He re-founded Ermysted's Grammar School in Skipton in 1548.

He was appointed to the twelfth stall in St George's Chapel, Windsor Castle in 1554, and held the stall until 1558.
