= Makerfield =

Area in North West England

Coordinates: 53°30′N 2°37′W

Makerfield is an area in North West England. It is now split between the Metropolitan Borough of Wigan in Greater Manchester and the Metropolitan Borough of St Helens in Merseyside, both within the historic county boundaries of Lancashire.

Places in the area include Ince-in-Makerfield, Ashton-in-Makerfield and Newton-in-Makerfield. The Domesday survey recorded an area of woodland in excess of ten leagues by six leagues associated with Newton. This was larger by far than anywhere else in the Cheshire survey. An area of this size would have encompassed most of the land bordered by present-day Warrington, Wigan, and Leigh boroughs. When Makerfield was referred to it could have been anywhere within this woodland area.

== Parliament ==
The western part of Wigan borough constitutes the Makerfield parliamentary constituency.

== Toponymy ==
The name Makerfield means "open land at Maker", this being a pre-existing toponym of Brittonic origin. The etymon is Primitive Welsh *maguïr, meaning "walls" or "ruins", possibly with reference to the Roman ruins at Wigan. Makerfield may be the same place as Maserfelth, mentioned by Bede as the site of a battle between Oswald of Northumbria and Penda of Mercia (see Battle of Maserfield).
