= St Bede's Catholic High School, Ormskirk =

St. Bede's Catholic High School

Location
- St. Anne's Road; Ormskirk, Lancashire, L39 4TA; England; 53°33′47″N 2°53′40″W

Information
- Type: Voluntary aided school
- Motto: Lex Tua Lux
- Religious affiliation: Roman Catholic
- Local authority: Lancashire
- Department for Education URN: 119792 Tables
- Ofsted: Reports
- Head teacher: D Morgan
- Gender: Coeducational
- Age: 11 to 16
- Enrolment: 711
- Website: https://sbchs.co.uk//

St. Bede's Catholic High School is a Roman Catholic, co-educational secondary school located on St. Anne's Road, Ormskirk, Lancashire, North West England. As a Catholic community school, it gives priority to parishioners' children and those living within the LEA.
