= Taurees Habib =

Pakistani composer (born 1988)

- Born: Taurees Habib; 1988 (age 37–38); Karachi, Pakistan
- Other name: Tauris Habib
- Education: Berklee College of Music; American University
- Occupations: Composer; Actor; Musician; Voice actor
- Years active: 2013–present
- Honours: Grammy Award (2025)

Taurees Habib is a Pakistani and American sound engineer and music producer. He won a Grammy Award for his work in the film Dune: Part Two.

== Early life and education ==
He was born and raised in Karachi, Pakistan. Habib has been involved in sound engineering and playing music since the age of 15. During his time in Karachi, Habib worked on the original play Karachi: The Musical, produced by Made For Stage Productions. He moved to Los Angeles in 2012. His younger brother, Ziyad Habib, is also involved in the Karachi indie music scene, having been a part of the band Mole and later founding Hear Now Records.

He wrote, recorded, produced, and performed his own music under the name Bedlam Jackson. He later studied Music Production and Engineering at Berklee College of Music in Boston. He was a part of an underground heavy metal scene as a teenager, he has described playing guitar and screaming vocals in a metal band.

== Career ==
After he graduated from Berklee College of Music then he started working as a sampling director for composer Hans Zimmer's Remote Control Productions.

He worked over 13 years working with Hans Zimmer at Remote Control Productions. He is the company's head of sampling, where he creates unique instrument sounds for movie scores. He scored music in films including Man of Steel, Interstellar, Dunkirk, Blade Runner 2049, The Lion King, No Time to Die, and Top Gun: Maverick, Habib also contributed to the scores for Dune, Dune: Part Two and Kung Fu Panda 4. In 2017, he voiced a character named Nawar in the podcast series Rose Drive. In 2025, He scored music for film F1.

In February 2025, Habib was awarded the Best Score Soundtrack for Visual Media for his work on the Dune: Part Two soundtrack. He is the first Pakistani sound engineer to receive a Grammy but Habib is only the second Pakistani overall to win a Grammy, following vocalist Arooj Aftab, who won in 2022.

Habib has also released his own music, including the project Cannibal Cathedral, which was released in October 2025.

== Personal life ==
He lives in Los Angeles, California and his younger brother Ziyad is a singer.

== Filmography ==
=== as composer ===
Year	Title	Notes
2013	Man of Steel	Composer
2013	The Lone Ranger	Composer
2013	Rush	Composer
2014	The Amazing Spider-Man 2	Composer
2014	Young Americans	Composer
2014	Interstellar	Composer
2015	Chappie	Composer
2015	Terminator Genisys	Composer
2015	Freeheld	Composer
2016	13 Hours: The Secret Soldiers of Benghazi	Composer
2016	Batman v Superman: Dawn of Justice	Composer
2016	The Last Face	Composer
2016	The Crown	Composer
2016	Inferno	Composer
2017	Rings	Composer
2017	The Boss Baby	Composer
2017	Dunkirk	Composer
2017	Blade Runner 2049	Composer
2018	Believer	Composer
2018	Icebox	Composer
2018	Widows	Composer
2019	Dark Phoenix	Composer
2019	The Lion King	Composer
2020	Rebuilding Paradise	Composer
2020	The Rhythm Section	Composer
2020	The SpongeBob Movie: Sponge on the Run	Composer
2020	Hillbilly Elegy	Composer
2020	Wonder Woman 1984	Composer
2021	The Boss Baby: Family Business	Composer
2021	Dune: Part One	Composer
2021	No Time to Die	Composer
2021	Army of Thieves	Composer
2021	The Unforgivable	Composer
2022	The Son	Composer
2022	The Night Logan Woke Up	Composer
2022	Top Gun: Maverick	Composer
2023	Are You There God? It's Me, Margaret.	Composer
2024	Dune: Part Two	Composer
2024	Kung Fu Panda 4	Composer
2024	Blitz	Composer
2025	F1	Composer

=== Podcast series ===
List of voice performances in podcast
Year	Title	Role(s)	Notes
2017	Rose Drive	Nawar	

=== as sound designer ===
Year	Title	Notes
2022	The Volcano: Rescue from Whakaari	Digital instrument

== Awards and recognition ==
Year	Award	Category	Result	Title	Ref.
2025	Grammy Awards	Best Score Soundtrack for Visual Media	Won	Dune: Part Two	
