= Skipton (disambiguation) =

Skipton is a town in North Yorkshire, England.

Skipton may also refer to:

- Skipton, Victoria, Australia, a town
  - Skipton Football Club
- Skipton (UK Parliament constituency), a county constituency in the West Riding of Yorkshire from 1885 to 1983
- Skipton Rural District, a rural district in the West Riding of Yorkshire from 1894 to 1974
- Skipton Girls' High School, Skipton, North Yorkshire
- The Skipton Academy, Skipton, North Yorkshire
- Richard Shipton (died 1726?), a pirate whose last name is occasionally spelled Skipton
- Skipton (horse), winner of the 1941 Melbourne Cup - see List of Melbourne Cup winners

== See also ==
- Skipton Building Society
- Skipton Castle
- Skipton railway station
- Skipton railway line, Victoria, Australia
- Skipton Woods
- Skipton Golf Club, North Yorkshire
- Skipton-on-Swale, North Yorkshire
- RAF Skipton-on-Swale, an ex-Royal Air Force station
