= Plaza Cinema, Skipton =

Cinema in North Yorkshire, England

Coordinates: 53.958°N 2.017°W

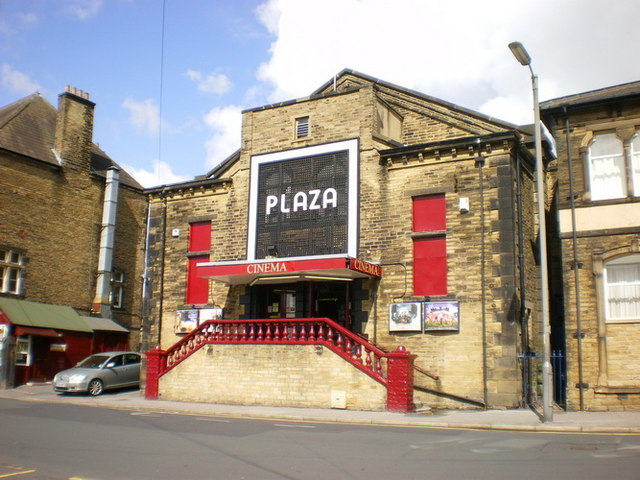
Plaza Cinema

The Plaza Cinema is a traditional cinema located in Skipton, North Yorkshire, England. It is the sole survivor of four cinemas that once existed in the town. The Plaza has circle seating and stalls with Pullman seats throughout.

== History ==
The Plaza is a traditional single screen cinema in the market town of Skipton, North Yorkshire. Designed by architect and engineer Jonathan Varley, it was built as a temperance hall in 1873, but was converted into a cinema in 1912. The Temperance Hall acquired its present ornate entrance in 1915 following its reopening as the Gem Picture Palace. In its early days it functioned as a music hall with films as part of the entertainment, then was acquired in the early 1920s by Matthew Hartley & Son. For three generations it stayed in the family, until it went up for sale in 1998 and was bought by Mr. Charles Morris to become a Northern Morris Cinema and operates alongside Leeds based cinema Cottage Road Cinema.

Our favourite story from the Plaza's long history concerns the management's way of keeping rowdy youngsters in check in those long gone days. The Plaza's secret weapon was a long pole with a stuffed boxing glove on the end. Anyone who started throwing popcorn, making too much noise or any committing any other misdemeanour would get a solid poke with the boxing glove from the extra long arm of the law!

From the Telegraph & Argus, first published Saturday 2 May 1998.

== Auditorium information ==
The auditorium now has 320 seats split between stalls and circle, down from 630 when the spacing was less comfortable. A Conn 651 Organ is installed which has been played by well known organists including Miss Frieda Hall and Arnold Loxam. The red seats have recently (2018) undergone refurbishment with new arm rests.
