= Skipton Wood =

Woodland in North Yorkshire, England

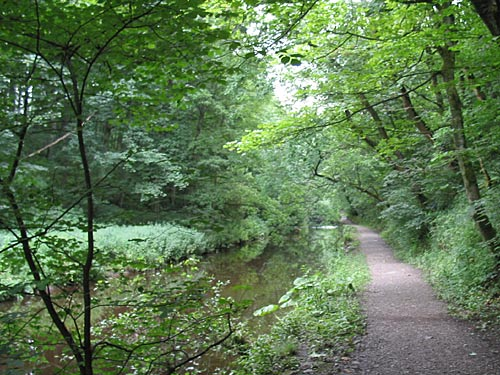

- Location within North Yorkshire
- Interactive map of Skipton Wood

Geography
- Location: North Yorkshire, England
- OS grid: SD991525
- Coordinates: 53.9688°N 2.015°W
- Area: 36-acre (15 ha)

Administration
- Authority: Woodland Trust

Skipton Wood (also known as Skipton Castle Woods, Castle Wood or Springs Wood) is a 36-acre (15 ha) wood following the valley of Eller Beck to the north of Skipton behind Skipton Castle in North Yorkshire, England. The wood is owned by Skipton Castle but has been leased to the Woodland Trust.

== History ==
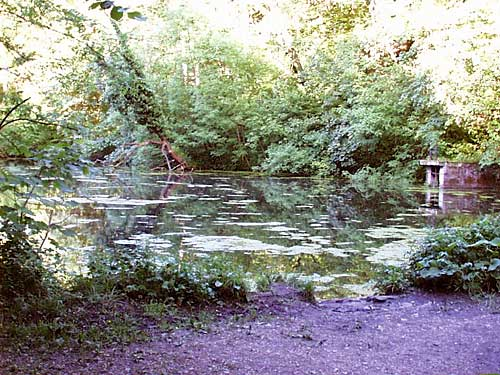
Round Dam

The wood was originally used by Skipton Castle primarily for hunting and fishing, although during the 18th and 19th centuries, the wood was also used to provide timber, building stone and water. The timber and stone was moved out of the wood via Springs Canal (a small branch off the Leeds and Liverpool Canal). The water was obtained by damming Eller Beck to form Long Dam, which in turn fed a small reservoir called Round Dam, also known as Mill Dam or Mill Pond. The water was used to power the former sawmill and corn mill located by the castle. Public access to the wood was first allowed by the owners of the castle in the late 19th century. When the woods were purchased by a private concern in 1966, they were closed until May 1971, when public access was granted again. The woods were leased to the Woodland Trust in October 1991.

The 36.77-acre (14.88 ha) woods have the Eller Beck flowing through them, which connects to the River Aire and are accessible from the Leeds and Liverpool Canal. The woods are also the starting point for Lady Anne's Way.

== Flora and fauna ==
Most of the wood is native broadleaved trees such as oak and ash and is classed as "ancient semi-natural woodland" by the Woodland Trust. There are also a large number of introduced beech and sycamore trees with a smaller number of non-native trees such as hornbeam and sweet chestnut. A small four hectare area of the wood to the north-west has been replanted with a mix of oak, Scots pine, larch and Norway spruce. This area has been designated as "replanted ancient woodland". The ground flora consists of dense carpets of wild garlic, bluebells and dog's mercury.

Notable animal species in the wood include badgers, roe deer, kingfishers, spotted flycatchers, sparrowhawks, great spotted and green woodpeckers, as well as Natterer's, noctule, pipistrelle, brown long-eared and Daubenton's bats.
