= Craven Museum & Gallery =

Museum in Skipton, North Yorkshire, England

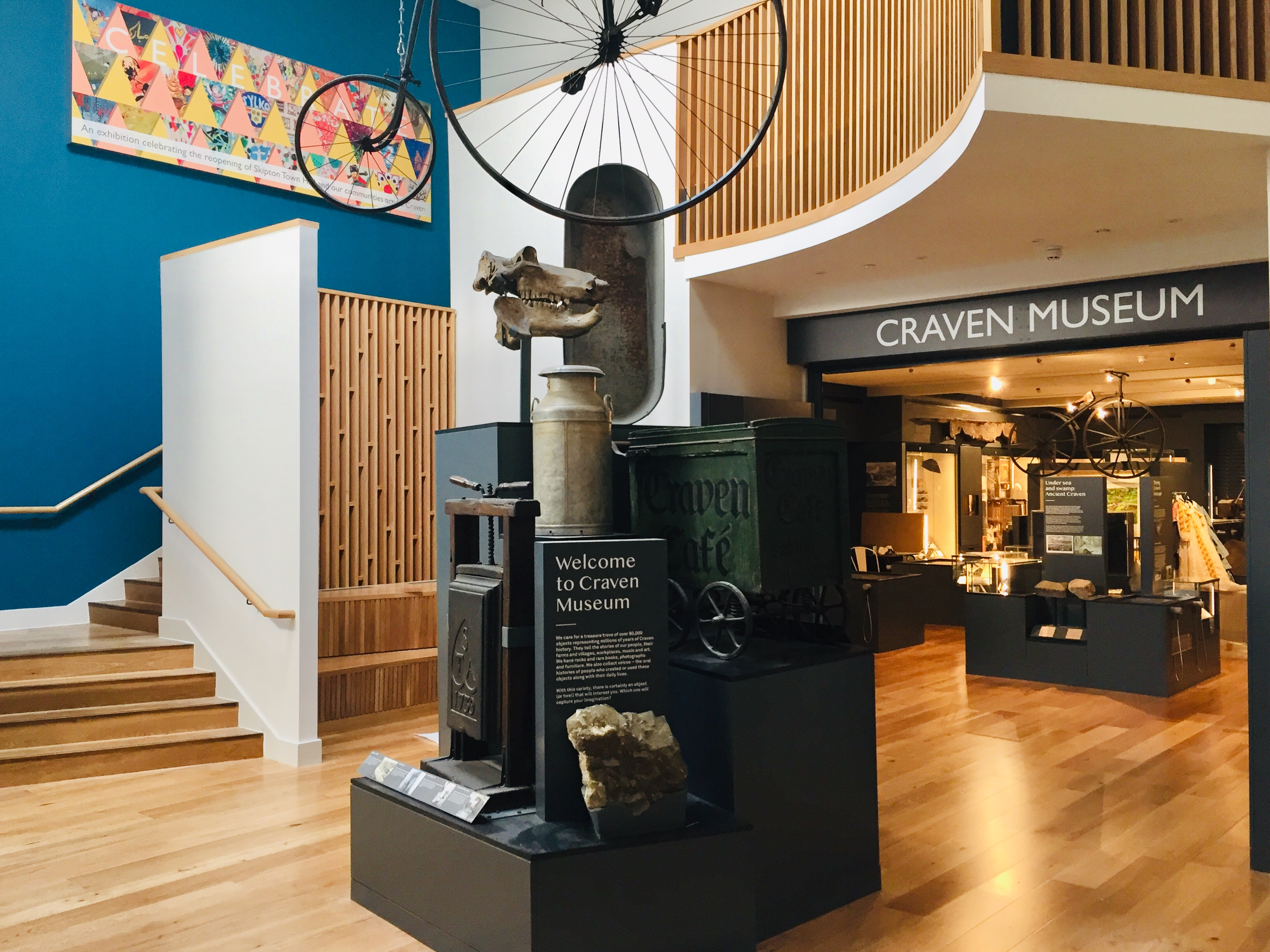

- Location of Craven Museum
- Established: 1928
- Location: Skipton, Town Hall, High Street, North Yorkshire, BD23 1AH, England
- Coordinates: 53.961663°N 2.015883°W
- Type: Local museum
- Parking: Behind Town Hall (pay)
- Website: Craven Museum

Craven Museum & Gallery is a museum located in the town of Skipton, North Yorkshire, England, in Skipton Town Hall. The museum holds a collection of local artefacts that depict life in Craven from the prehistoric times to the modern day. On 21 June 2021, the museum reopened after a National Lottery Heritage Funded redevelopment project.

== History ==
The museum was founded on 6 October 1928 by members of local groups such as the Craven Naturalists and Scientific Association, Skipton Mechanics' Institute, Friends Adult School, and the Workers' Educational Association to house a number of existing collections, including the finds from the Elbolton Cave excavations, the Craven Herbarium and Richard Tiddeman's reef knoll collection. It was opened by Sir Henry Alexander Miers, president of the museum's association. The museum was located in a room in Skipton library and had its own committee and trustees, with some members being local figureheads such as Mr J. Dufty, a master at the local grammar school.

In 1934, to ensure the survival of the museum and to allow its growth, responsibility for its management was transferred to Skipton Urban District Council. The museum continued to gather more objects for its collection and increased in size, which continued for over 30 years. On 21 April 1969, the Friends of the Craven Museum was established with Arthur Raistrick as its chair. Within months, it had hundreds of members. The Friends of the Craven Museum were on the constant lookout for anything that could be added to the museum's collection.

Volunteers played a vital part in the museum, especially when it came to transporting heavier objects to the museum, such as a Derbyshire ore crusher. The ore crusher was restored and unveiled to the public in 1970. Volunteers also did other tasks such as labelling exhibits, carrying out research on the collection, and cleaning displays. The Friends also funded excavations; the most notable being a tilery kiln in nearby Rylstone. On 11 December 1973, the museum was officially moved across the road to its current location in Skipton Town Hall.

In 2005 an exhibition gallery was opened which hosts a variety of temporary exhibitions every year. In 2015 the museum received initial support for a £2.1 million redevelopment project called "Stories and Treasures of Street and Dale", which aims to update the museum's facilities.

The museum closed in September 2018 for refurbishment, and it reopened in June 2021.

== Collections ==
The museum has a variety of objects from prehistoric Craven to the modern day. Objects come from all over the world, ranging from Italy to Egypt. Objects range from costumes, photographs, agricultural tools, naturalist collections and an oral history collection.

=== Biology ===
The museum's biology collection consists mainly of the collection of naturalists and enthusiast collector. Collections include the Colonel Tottie 19th century bird egg collection, the entomology collection, the botany collection and the zoology collection.

=== Geology ===
The geology collection is made up of a variety of rocks, minerals and fossils, most of which were collected by local collector Welbury Wilkinson Holgate and Dr Arthur Raistrick. Many of the rocks and minerals are from the Craven area, like limestone. Fossils in the collection range from ammonites, coral, and bivalves, to the vertebrae of an Ichthyosaurus.

=== Archaeology ===
The archaeology collection ranges from the Paleolithic to the post-medieval period. Many items have been found in local excavations. Collections include cave finds from the nearby Elbolton and Victoria caves, a lithics collection, finds from Doggerbank, Roman finds from nearby Kirk Sink Villa and from the Sunderland collection, and an Elizabethan coin hoard.

=== Social History ===
The museum has a collection of artefacts associated with the social history in Craven. The artefacts cover homelife with a display of domestic appliances, childhood with a collection of toys; working life with exhibits on agriculture, lead mining, and notable people from Craven, such as the Calendar girls, the co-founder of Marks and Spencer, Thomas Spencer and Thomas Cresap, who became a pioneer in America.

=== Oral History ===
Over the last four decades, the museum has interviewed local people to find out more about the history of the Craven area. There are 70 tapes overall, covering topics such as life during the World Wars, working on the Leeds and Liverpool Canal, and farming.

=== Art ===
The museum has an eclectic collection of oil and watercolour paintings, prints, textiles and sculptures, many made by local artists such as Reginald Arthur Smith, Kenneth Holmes, and William Shuttleworth. The majority of the paintings feature local scenery or people such as Lady Anne Clifford of Skipton Castle. A large portion of the art collection is made up of the famous Roebuck collection belonging to art collector Clement Roebuck.

=== Costumes ===
There is a collection of costumes and accessories in the museum, many of which are on permanent display. These include dresses from the 18th century up to contemporary pieces like 1940s evening dresses, uniforms from the Skipton Brass Band and the Home Guard, and accessories include spectacles and ladies' handbags.

== Notable collections ==
=== First Folio ===
An incomplete copy of Shakespeare's First Folio owned by a local businessman and donated by his daughter in the 1930s was misidentified as a second folio until recently, when it was identified by Anthony James West. The folio is one of only four on display in the world.

=== The Flasby Sword ===
An Iron Age Celtic sword was found on the nearby Flasby moor. By 1880, it was owned by Captain Preston of Flasby Hall. The sword was eventually donated to the museum. The sword is made of iron and the scabbard of copper. It is lined with wood with typical Celtic decorations on it. Because of how well it was preserved, it is believed that the sword was thrown into a pit as a ritual offering.

=== Merovingian Frankish Gold Tremissis ===
The museum holds a tremissis, a Frankish gold coin, that dates from 580 AD to 630AD. It was found in the 1970s when the Holy Trinity Church in Skipton was undergoing construction. A small hole near the edge of the coin suggests it may have been worn as a pendant.

=== Mouseman Collection ===
The museum holds a collection of 17 objects made by the famous carver Robert Thompson, otherwise known as 'Mouseman'. The museum received the collection from the son of Kenneth Hodgson, who was an avid collector of 'Mouseman' furniture.

=== Roebuck Collection ===
145 pieces of art given to the museum by millionaire Clement Roebuck in 1988. Roebuck was an avid art collector and sat on the selection committee for the Huddersfield art gallery. He would often acquire pieces rejected by the committee. In his later life, he moved to Starbotton in Upper Wharfedale and then Langbar near Bolton Abbey.

=== Amethyst Intaglio ===
A Roman engraved amethyst intaglio was found in the nearby Hellifield and donated to the museum in 1934. The carving presents a man, possibly Odysseus, offering wine to the cyclops Polyphemus before blinding him.

== Exhibitions ==
The gallery, which is located next to the Skipton Tourist Information Centre, puts on a variety of exhibitions. Past exhibitions include the 800th anniversary Magna Carta exhibition, SELFA Champions! exhibit, and Bike, Legs, Action!. This is an exhibition about the Tour De France and its arrival to Yorkshire. The gallery is also home to recurring exhibitions like Craven Open, which displays the work of local artists, and Yarndale, a yearly festival in Skipton about all things Yarn related.

In 2014, the museum temporarily loaned its Shakespeare first folio to the Yorkshire Museum in exchange for two Iron Age gold bracelets dating from around 100 BC. The bracelets are the oldest example of gold found in Yorkshire.

== Visitor information ==
Craven Museum & Gallery is inside Skipton Town Hall, which is located on Skipton High Street. It is approximately a five-minute walk away from the Skipton bus station and a twenty-minute walk from the Skipton railway station.

== Awards ==
The museum has been the recipient of prestigious awards including the Kids in Museums Family Friendly Museum and Best Accessible Museum 2023 awards. In addition, Craven Museum was one of five Museums shortlisted for the Art Fund Museum of the Year 2024 award.

== Gallery ==
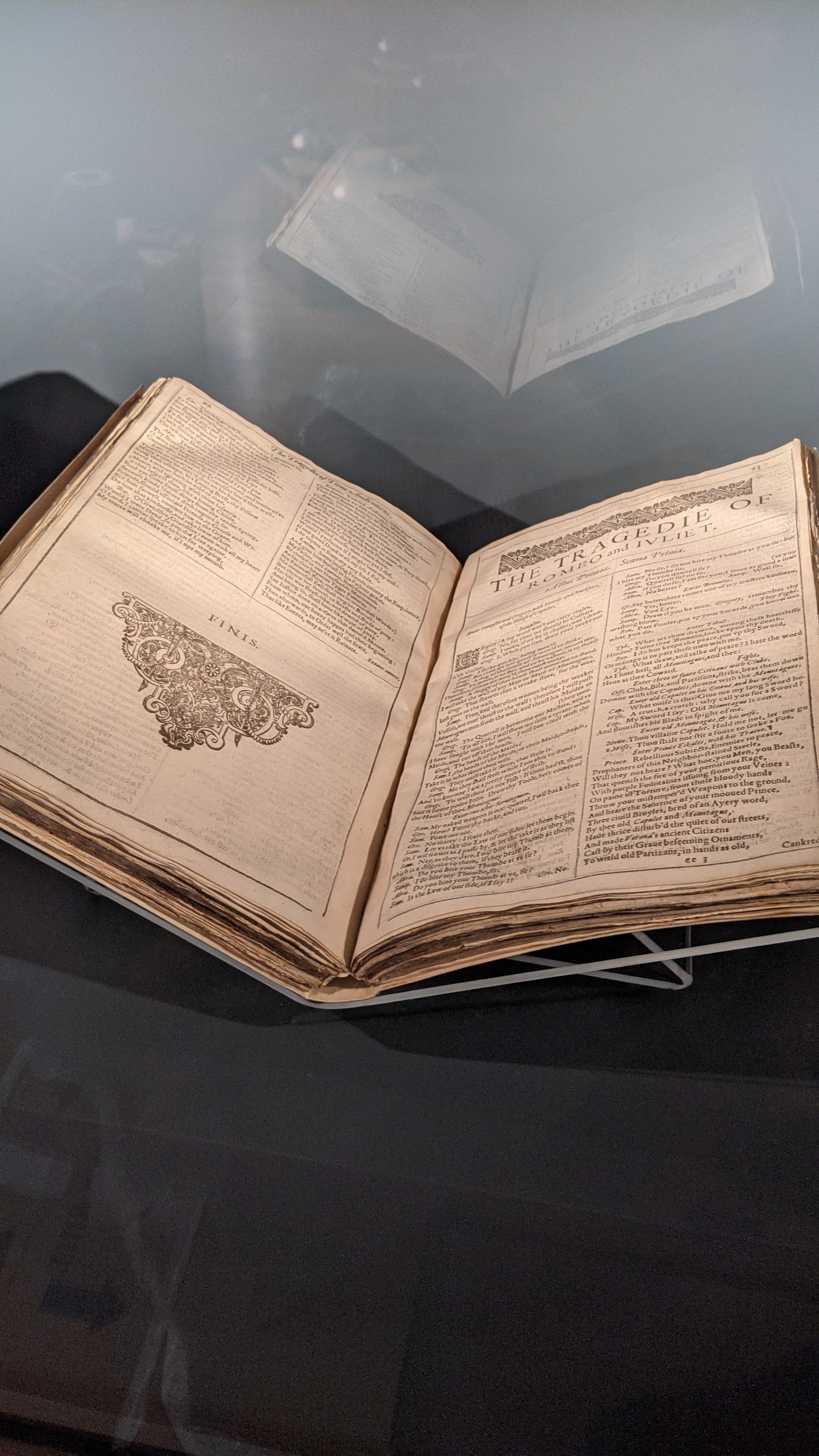
Shakespeare's First Folio

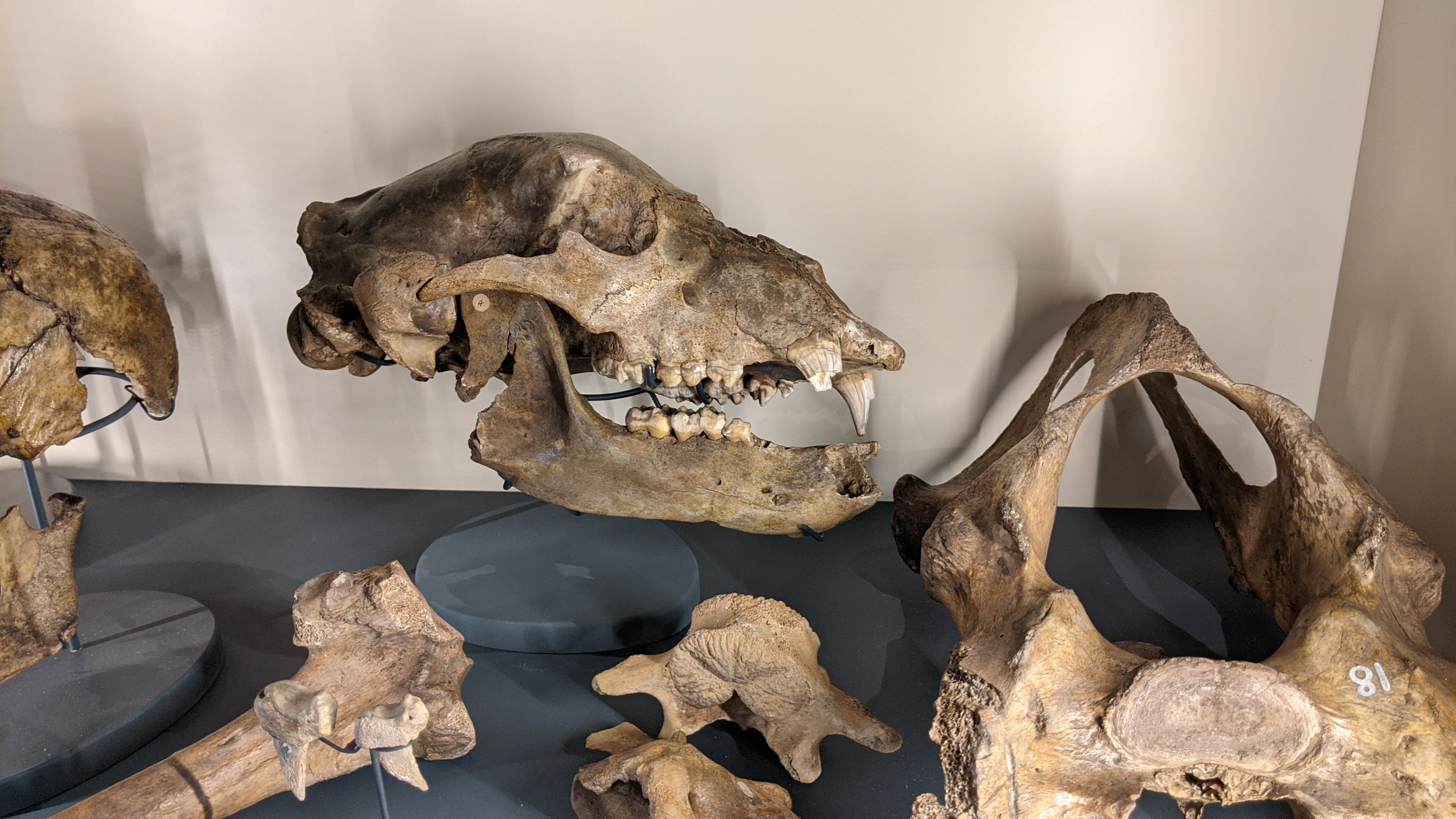
Brown bear bones excavated from Elbolton Cave

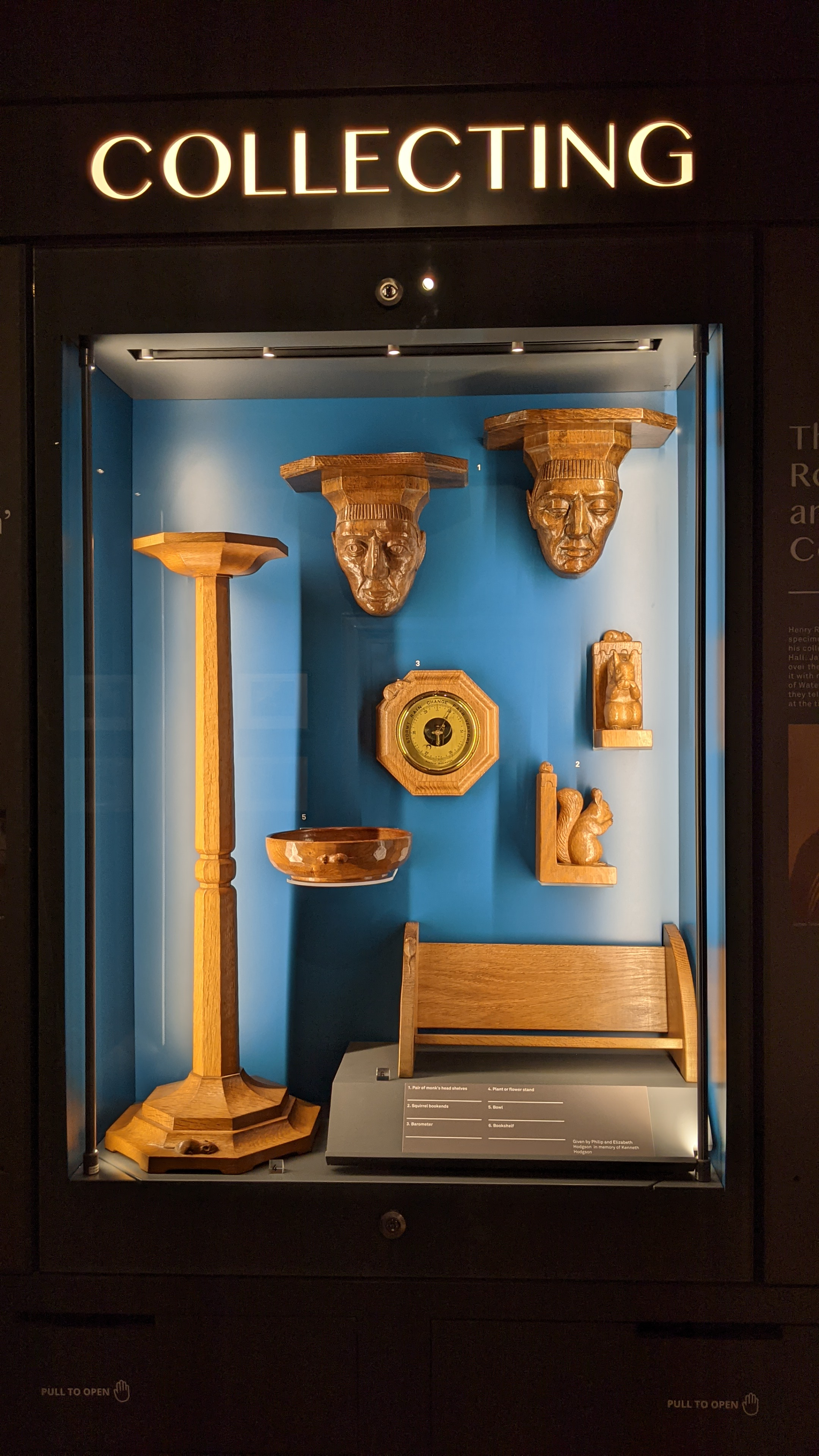
Robert 'Mouseman' Thompson furniture

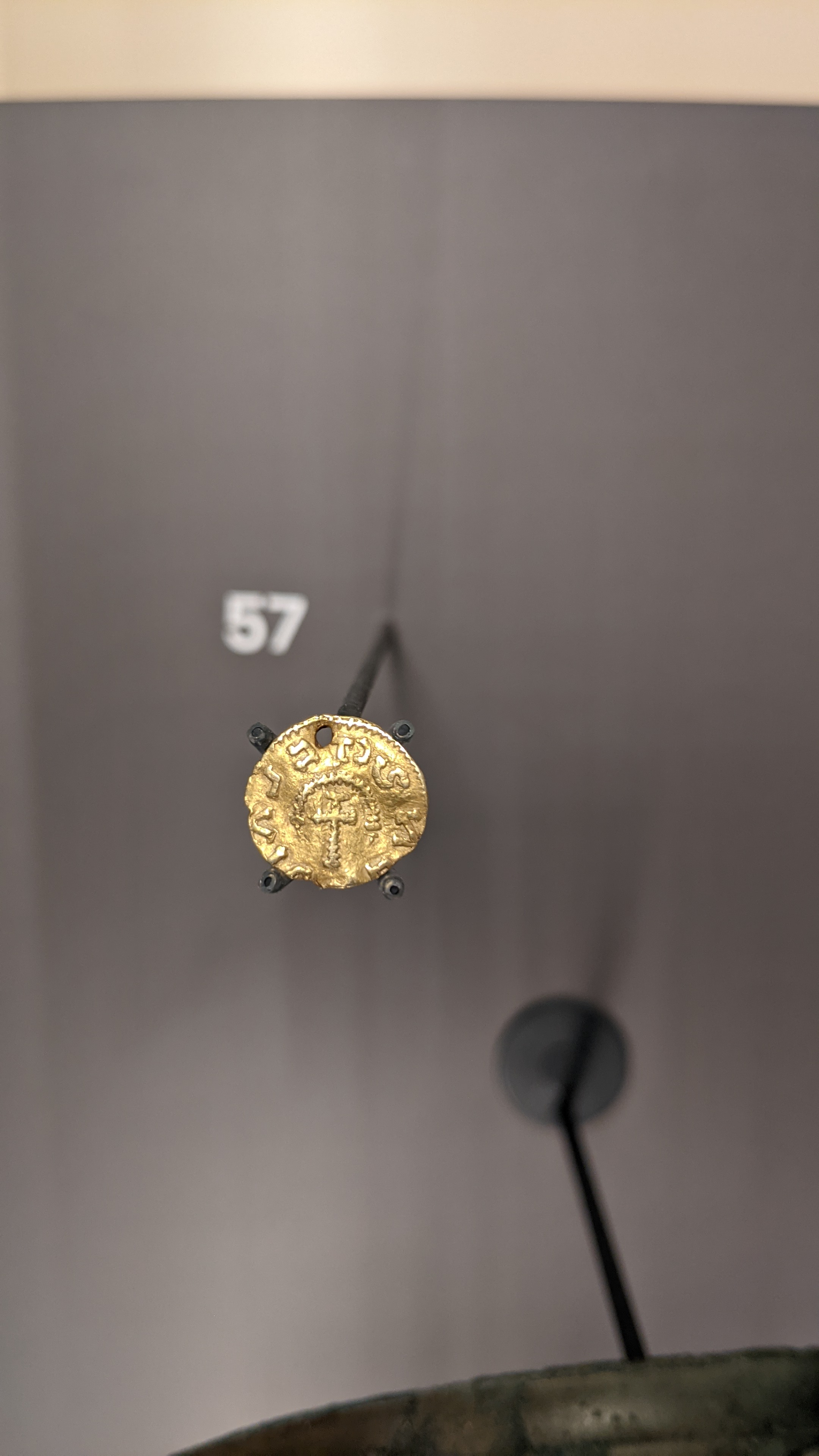
Gold tremissis

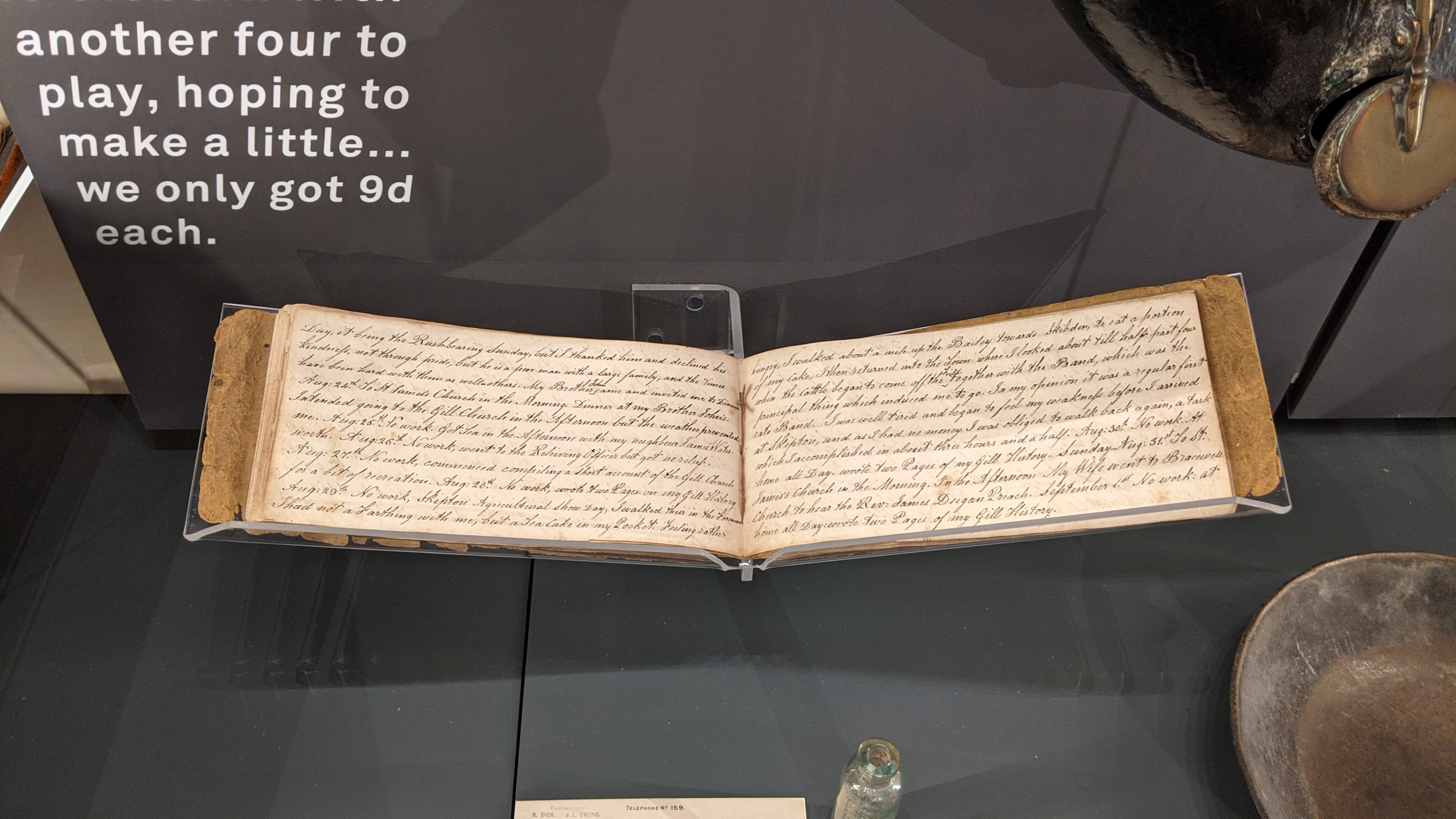
Richard Ryley's diary

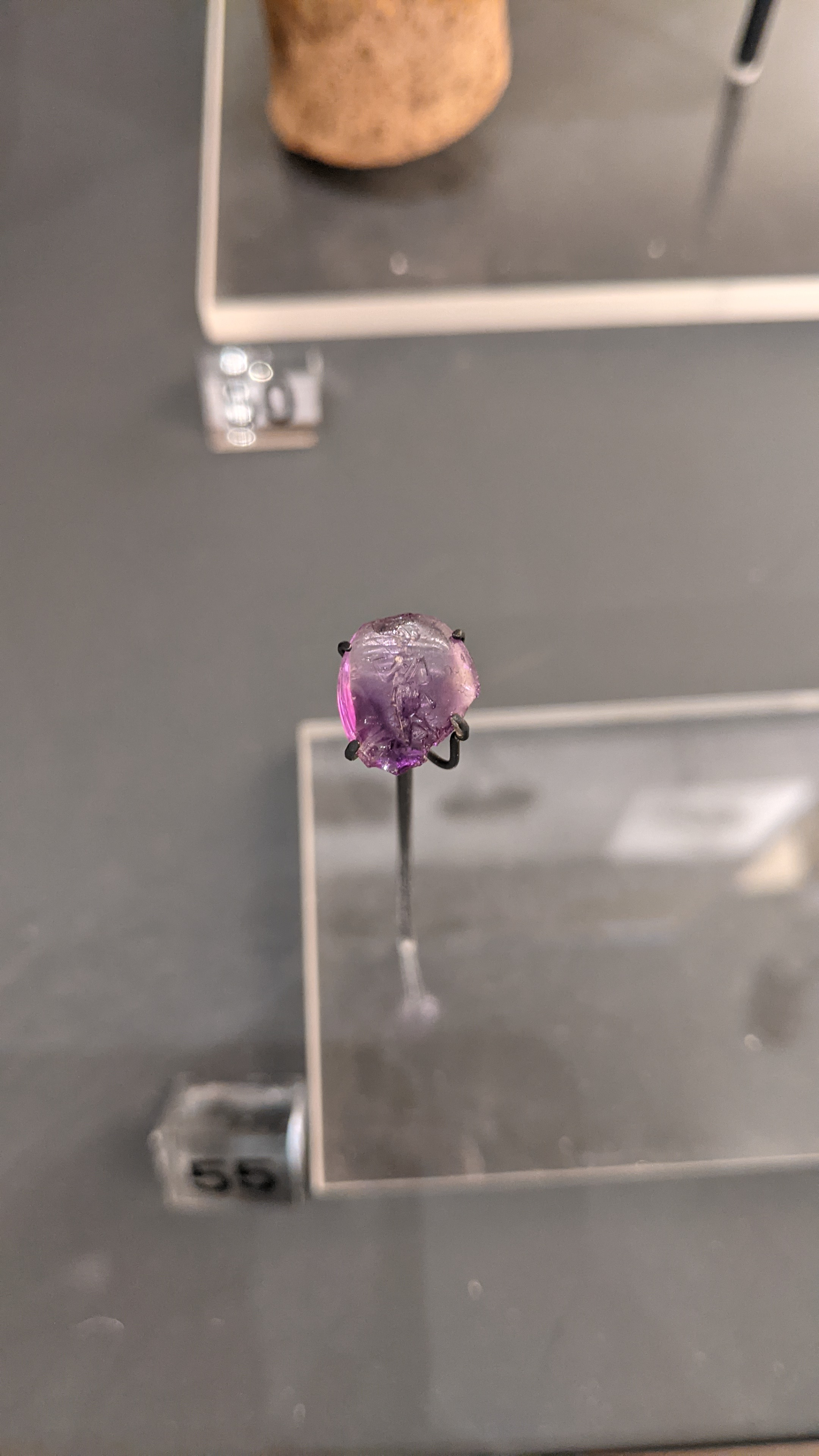
Amethyst intaglio

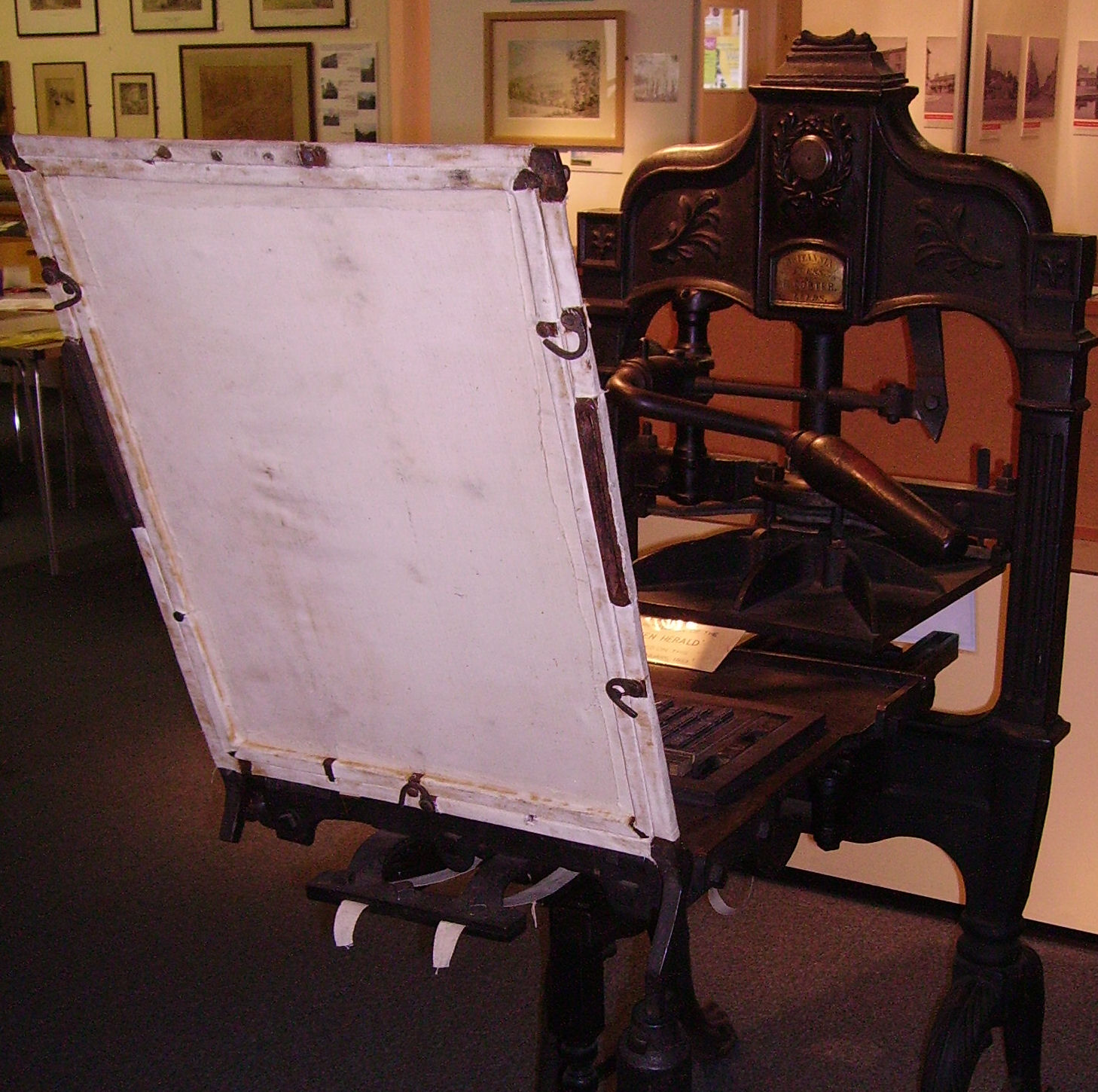
Printing press

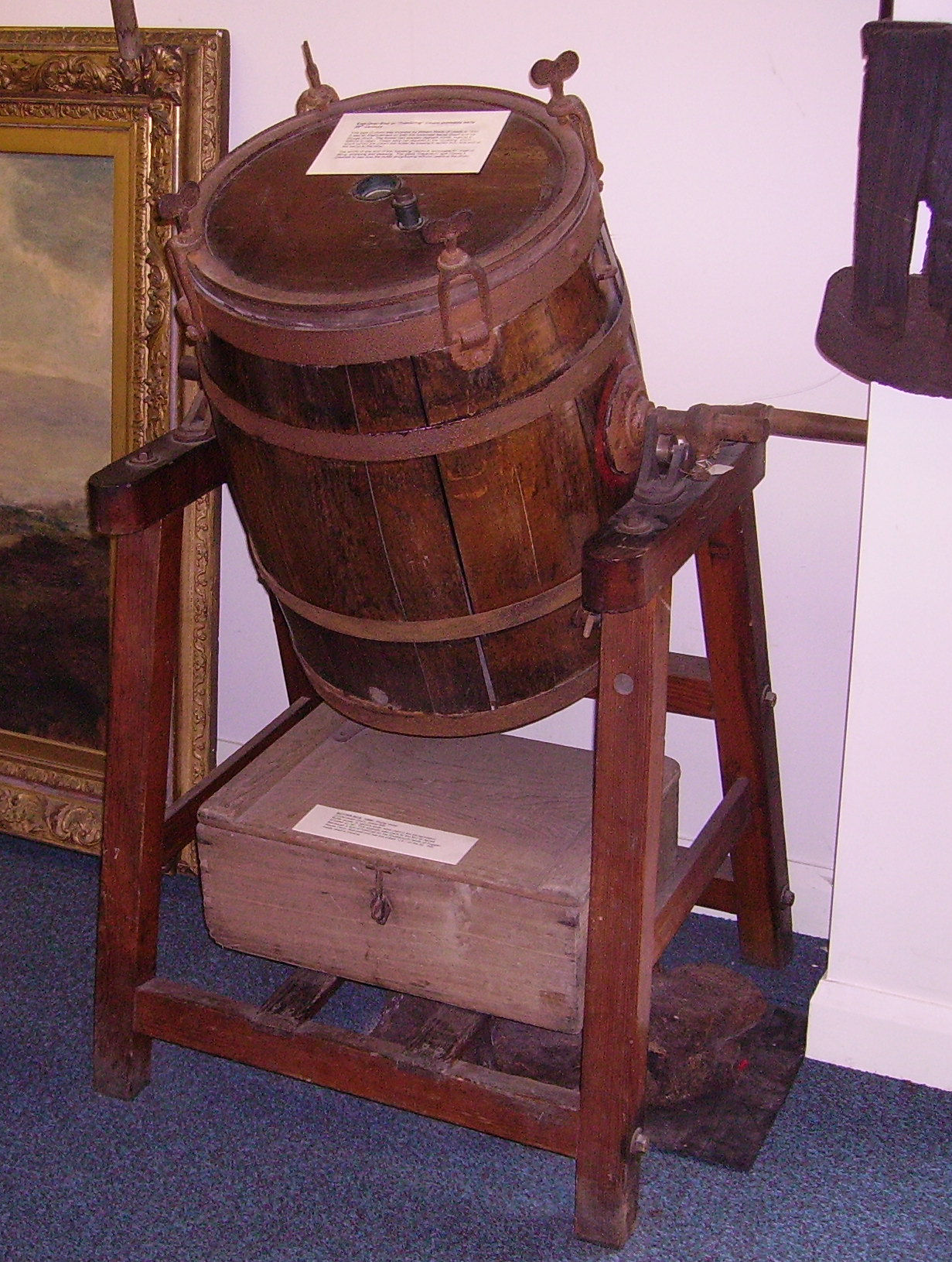
Butter churning

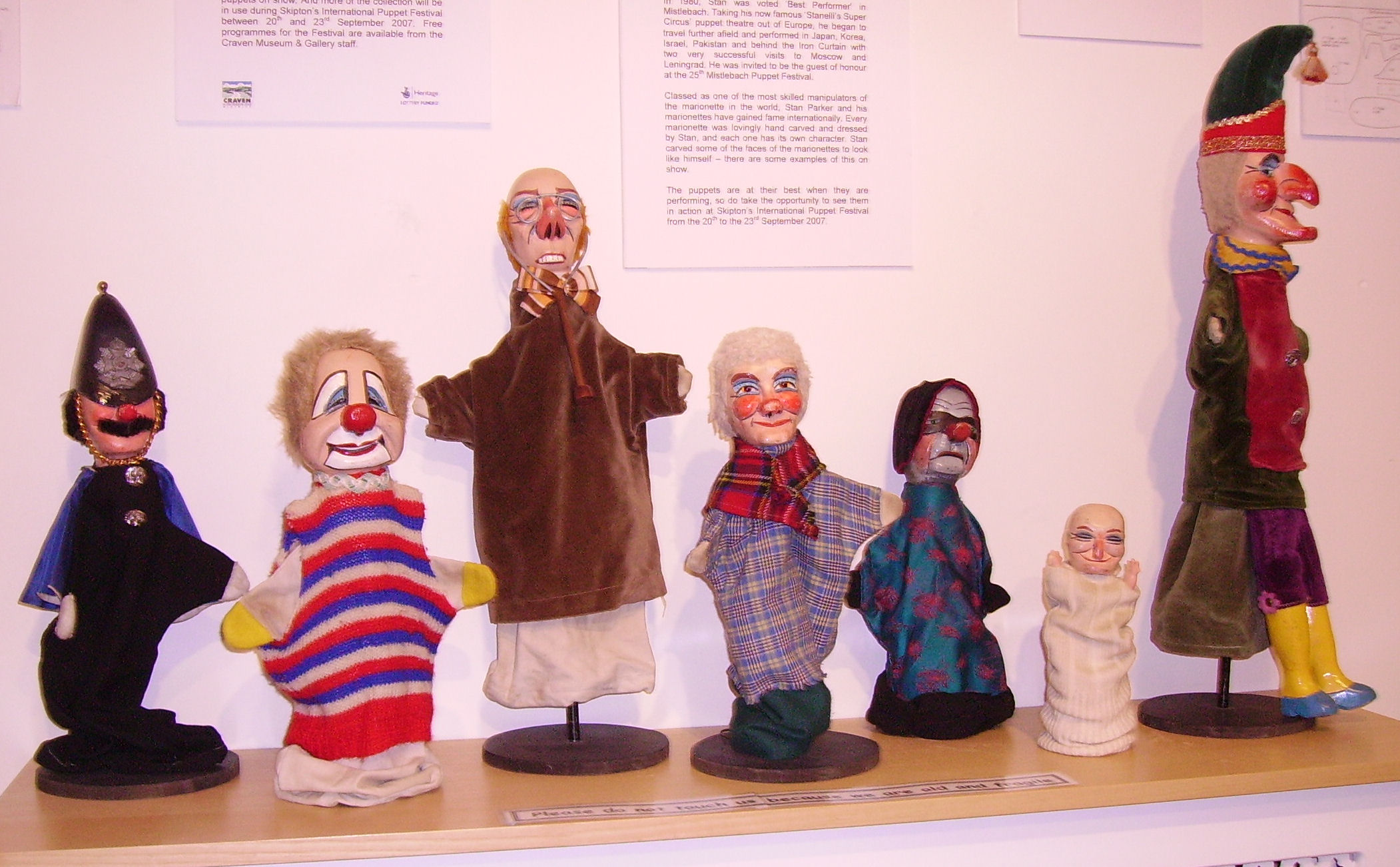
Punch and Judy puppets

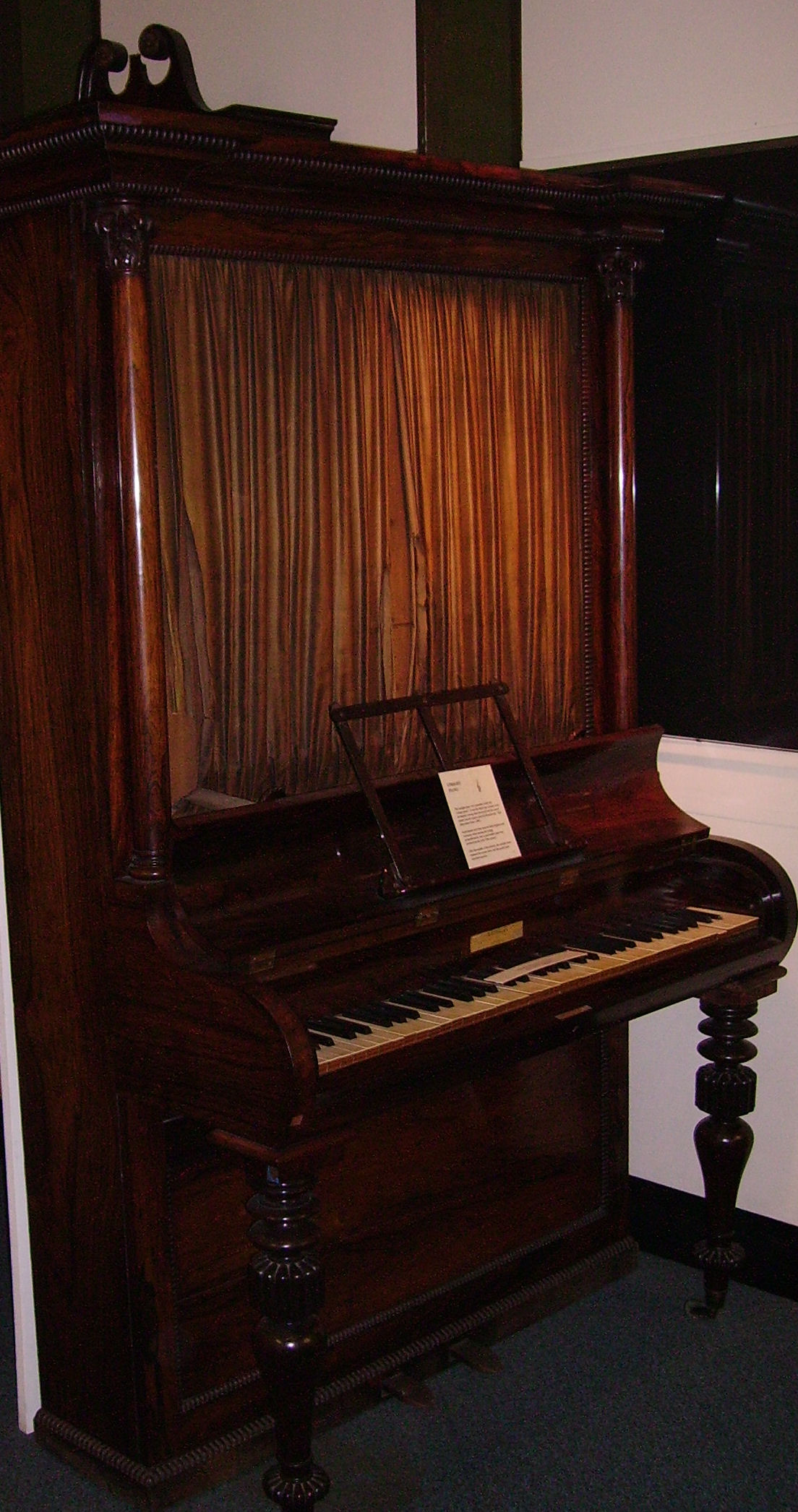
Upright piano
