= Eller Beck =

River in North Yorkshire, England

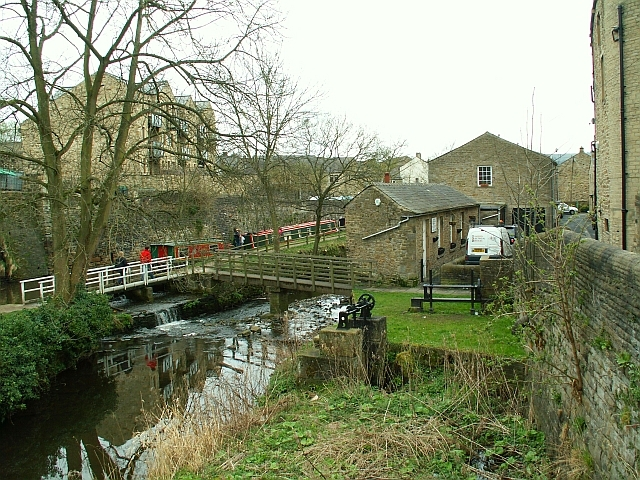
- Eller Beck just below the Water Street culvert, showing the overflow from the canal and some redundant sluices which formerly controlled flow to the mills downstream.

Location
- Country: England
- Counties: North Yorkshire

Physical characteristics
- Source
  - location: Out Fell
- Mouth
  - location: River Aire below Skipton

The Eller Beck is a small river in North Yorkshire, England, that flows through the town of Skipton and is a tributary of the River Aire. Its channel was heavily modified to supply water to mills in the 18th and 19th centuries, and although all the mills have closed, the water now supplies power to the National Grid, generated by a turbine at High Corn Mill. The beck flows through several underground culverts in Skipton that contribute to the flood risk. To alleviate flooding in Skipton town centre, a scheme involving two flood water storage reservoirs was designed and eventually completed in 2017.

== Course ==
Eller Beck is formed by streams that rise in the hills to the north of Skipton. They include Black Sike, which rises above the 1,410-foot (430 m) contour on Out Fell, to the west of Upper Barden Reservoir, and several more which rise in Bilton Ings, close to the 1,395-foot (425 m) contour, to the south west of the reservoir. Along with water from a spring called Boiling Well, they form Waterfall Gill Beck, which becomes Eller Beck. It flows around the northern and western edges of Nettlehole Wood and Crookrise Wood, to be joined by Sandy Beck before passing under the freight-only railway line to Swinden Quarry. The railway bridge is below the 560-foot (170 m) contour.

The railway follows the valley of the beck as it is joined by Owlet House Beck, passes under two farm access bridges, and under Tarn Moor Bridge, which carries a minor road to Embsay. The bridge dates from the late 18th century and was altered in the mid 19th century. It has a single round arch, is constructed of squared rubble with stone dressings, and is a Grade II Listed structure. The river then meanders through Skipton Golf Club, where it is a water hazard for the back nine holes, before it is joined by Haw Beck, which flows from the east alongside the Embsay and Bolton Abbey Steam Railway for most of its length. It passes under the A65 Leeds to Kendal road through two large round tubes, to enter Skipton Woods.

The river through the woods was engineered to provide water to power wool, corn and saw mills for two centuries. A dam across the river creates the stretch known as the Long Dam, and a sluice above the dam feeds water into the Round Dam, from where water enters a culvert and a high-level channel, Sandy Goit, that once fed the mill near the entrance to the woods. Sougha Gill adds to the flow just below the dam, and further down, the water from the mill channel flows under the footpath through a stone lined channel to rejoin the river. The mill, built by Peter Garforth, John Blackburn and John Sidgwick, started as a cotton mill in 1785. Wooden frames for spinning cotton yarn were powered by water, but the supply was not adequate to support two shifts, and production was scaled down. In 1825, the mill was extended, and the new section used steam power. By 1882, some weaving was carried out at the mill, but it was marked as disused on the 1891 Skipton Town plans.

=== Town section ===
As the beck leaves the woods, it is separated from the Thanet Canal (or Springs Branch) by a high, narrow towpath. Some of the water enters the canal, but the main flow continues towards the town, through a channel which is in parts paved with stones. The pond for High Corn Mill is adjacent to the river, with an overflow into it. The mill was originally the Soke-Mill, first documented in 1310, when it was the only place where tenants of the Manor of Skipton were allowed to grind their corn, and had to pay a "mulcture toll", which entitled the miller to keep a proportion of the product. The Earl of Thanet protected the monopoly of the mill vigorously, and the toll was only lifted in the 19th century. The mill, and other properties owned by Skipton Castle Estates, was sold in 1954. It was acquired by George Leatt in 1965, who began a major programme of restoration. A new waterwheel to replace the original wheel which was removed around 1900 was fitted in 1967. Since 2010, the water supply has been used to drive a water turbine supplying power to the national grid. The mill has been refurbished to provide accommodation for shops and businesses. It straddles the beck with a single arch, and the present three-storey structure is thought to date from the 18th century.

Below the mill, the river passes under a Grade II Listed bridge, dating from the 19th century, which carries the B6265 at Mill Street, and continues through the first of several culverts that carry it under Skipton. It passes under Water Street, and then surfaces to run beside the canal. Some old sluices once controlled the flow to Mill Dam, which supplied the water for Millfields Mill, just above Coach Street. In 1822, the mill was occupied by James Wilson, a spinner of worsted. The lower floor was used as a paper glazing mill, but from the 1840s, Messrs. Mason and Hallam used the entire building for spinning worsted. By 1882, it had become a spindle works, making spindles for the textile industry. Mill Dam was shown on the 1969 map, but had become a car park by 1979. The river continues, passing under Coach Street and some buildings, including a former chapel which was adapted to serve as a base for the fire engine, before turning sharply to the south. It passes under the Leeds and Liverpool Canal, and under buildings and the A6069 at Belmont Street. The Environment Agency maintain a gauging station near Morrisons supermarket to measure water levels, before the river enters a culvert, which carries it under the supermarket carpark to the east of Skipton railway station and the railway. Underground, it is joined by Waller Hill Beck, which is also known as Wilderness or Skibeden Beck, which is also partially culverted under Skipton. To the south of the railway, it runs through a business park, to the east of Sandylands playing fields, and past the Waltonwrays cemetery and crematorium. A final bridge carries it under the A629 Rotherham to Skipton road, before it joins the River Aire.

== Flood prevention ==
Skipton suffered from flooding in 1908, 1979, 1982, 2000, 2004 and 2007. High volumes of water enter the town from Eller Beck from the north and Waller Hill Beck from the east. Both are culverted in the town, and Eller Beck is prone to carrying woody debris from Skipton Woods into the culverts, causing blockages. A Skipton Flood Alleviation Scheme was developed by the Environment Agency, which would cost an estimated £9.7 million to implement. The three component parts are a flood storage reservoir on Eller Beck, to the north of the A65 road, a similar structure on the Waller Hill Beck, and the construction of flood walls at strategic points in the town.

The Eller Beck storage reservoir will have an earth dam, 355 yards (325 m) long and a maximum height of 46 feet (14 m). It will be 13 feet (4 m) wide at the crest, and contain 124,000 cubic yards (95,000 m^{3}) of material. It will enable the storage of a maximum of 15.3 million cubic feet (430 Ml) of flood water. A 100-yard (91 m) culvert through the dam will carry normal river flows. The bottom of the culvert will have baffles to retain materials and create a low-flow channel to aid fish migration. Flows up to 600 cubic feet per second (17 m^{3}/s) will not be restricted, but greater flows will be limited by a control structure, so that the excess water will be stored in the reservoir. Material for construction of the dam will be obtained from a pit near the reservoir on Waller Hill Beck, and transported along the A65. One of the main objectors to the scheme was the golf club, where the 16th and 17th holes would have to be moved, and three other holes would be flooded when the flood gate is closed. Following consultation, agreement was reached on how the golf course would be remodelled. Within the town, three sections of flood wall will be built along the banks of Eller Beck. At Morrisons open culvert, to the north of the underground culvert beneath the carpark, 50 yards (46 m) of wall with a maximum height of 2 feet (0.6 m) will be built on the left bank, and on the right bank, there will be 32 yards (29 m) of wall with a maximum height of 4.3 feet (1.3 m). Another 16-yard (15 m) wall will be built on the right bank of the beck immediately above the Coach Street culvert.

In October 2014, the Environment Agency (EA) announced that the start of the scheme had been postponed, due to a shortfall in funding. The total cost for the complete project was £13.8 million, of which the EA were supplying £8.8 million. The Department for Environment, Food and Rural Affairs (Defra) were contributing £1.7 million, with £2.1 million from Craven District Council, North Yorkshire County Council, the Yorkshire Regional Flood and Coastal Committee, and Yorkshire Water. This left a shortfall of £1.2 million. Discussions had taken place with a number of possibly funding sources, including those particularly affected by flooding, but no additional contributions had been offered. At the end of October, a bid was made to the North Yorkshire Local Enterprise Partnership, which had received additional government funding for its Local Growth Deal fund. The shortfall was eventually supplied by the York, North Yorkshire and East Riding Local Enterprise Partnership, on the basis that the scheme would support economic growth in Skipton. The member of Parliament for Skipton, Julian Smith, stated that around 500 jobs would be created as a result of the completed scheme. Work began at the golf course site in June 2015, with the raising of the defence walls through the town expected to take place in the autumn.

Although not completed at the time, the scheme received a Yorkshire Planning Excellence Award from the Royal Town Planning Institute in August 2016. The judges recognised the quality of the technical planning work which had been carried out, and the management required to steer it through the complex planning process. By January 2017, the major construction works were completed, with mechanical and electrical work about to start. Landscaping would be delayed until weather conditions were more favourable, and the scheme was due to be finished by the end of the spring in 2017, however, the project was not completed until the autumn of 2018.

== Water quality ==
The Environment Agency measure water quality of the river systems in England. Each is given an overall ecological status, which may be one of five levels: high, good, moderate, poor and bad. There are several components that are used to determine this, including biological status, which looks at the quantity and varieties of invertebrates, angiosperms and fish, and chemical status, which compares the concentrations of various chemicals against known safe concentrations. Chemical status is rated good or fail.

The water quality of Eller Beck and its tributaries was as follows in 2019.

| Section | Ecological Status | Chemical Status | Length | Catchment | Channel |
|---|---|---|---|---|---|
| Eller Beck from Source to Haw Beck | Moderate | Fail | 5.4 miles (8.7 km) | 4.98 square miles (12.9 km^{2}) | |
| Haw Beck from Source to Eller beck | Moderate | Fail | 6.1 miles (9.8 km) | 4.38 square miles (11.3 km^{2}) | heavily modified |
| Eller Beck from Haw Beck to River Aire | Moderate | Fail | 6.6 miles (10.6 km) | 3.6 square miles (9.3 km^{2}) | |

The water quality of the section above Haw Beck has deteriorated since 2013, when was rated good for ecological status, and the lower section, which includes data from Skibeden Beck, has improved since 2016 when it was rated poor. Like most rivers in the UK, the chemical status changed from good to fail in 2019, due to the presence of polybrominated diphenyl ethers (PBDE), perfluorooctane sulphonate (PFOS) and mercury compounds, none of which had previously been included in the assessment.

== Points of interest ==
| Point | Coordinates (Links to map resources) | OS Grid Ref | Notes |
|---|---|---|---|
| Source on Out Fell | 54.0184°N 2.0036°W | SD998580 | Black Syke |
| Source on Bilton Ings | 54.0069°N 1.9960°W | SE003567 | |
| Boiling Well spring | 54.0103°N 2.0193°W | SD988571 | |
| Junction with Sandy Beck | 53.9949°N 2.0384°W | SD975554 | |
| Skipton Golf course flood defences | 53.9731°N 2.0108°W | SD993530 | |
| Round Dam in Skipton Woods | 53.9690°N 2.0148°W | SD991525 | |
| Leeds & Liverpool Canal aqueduct | 53.9610°N 2.0223°W | SD986516 | |
| Culverts under car park | 53.9586°N 2.0228°W | SD986513 | |
| Junction with River Aire | 53.9473°N 2.0257°W | SD984501 | |

== Bibliography ==
- Arup (2013). "Waller Hill Beck Flood Storage Reservoir and Town Centre Flood Walls" (PDF). Craven District Council. Archived from the original (PDF) on 4 March 2016.
- Dawson, William Harbutt (2012) [1882]. History of Skipton. Simpkin Marshall.
- Environment Agency (2014). "Construction of Flood Storage Reservoir on Eller Beck". North Yorkshire County Council. Archived from the original on 4 March 2016.
- Rowley, Geoffrey (1983). The Book of Skipton. Barracuda Books. ISBN 978-0-86023-177-6.
