= Skipton Town Hall =

Municipal building in Skipton, North Yorkshire, England

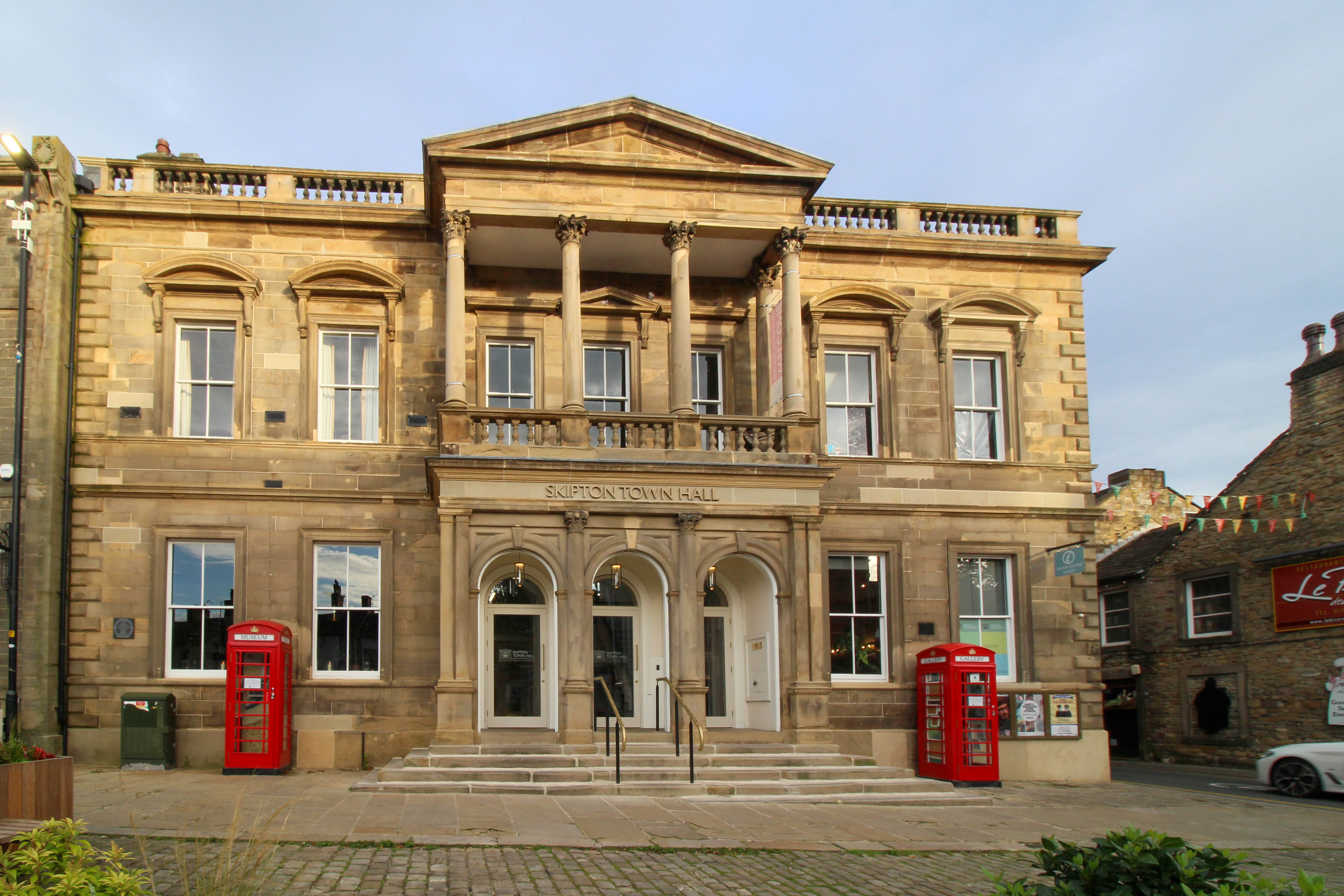
- A view from the front

- Shown in North Yorkshire
- 53°57′44″N 2°00′57″W
- Location: High Street, Skipton

History
- Built: 1862

Site notes
- Architectural style: Neoclassical style

Listed Building – Grade II
- Designated: 2 March 1978
- Reference no.: 1301634

Skipton Town Hall is the town hall of Skipton, North Yorkshire. It is located on the town's High Street and is home to Craven Museum & Gallery as well as a Concert Hall with events and performance programme and Skipton Tourist Information Centre. The building is Grade II listed.

== History ==
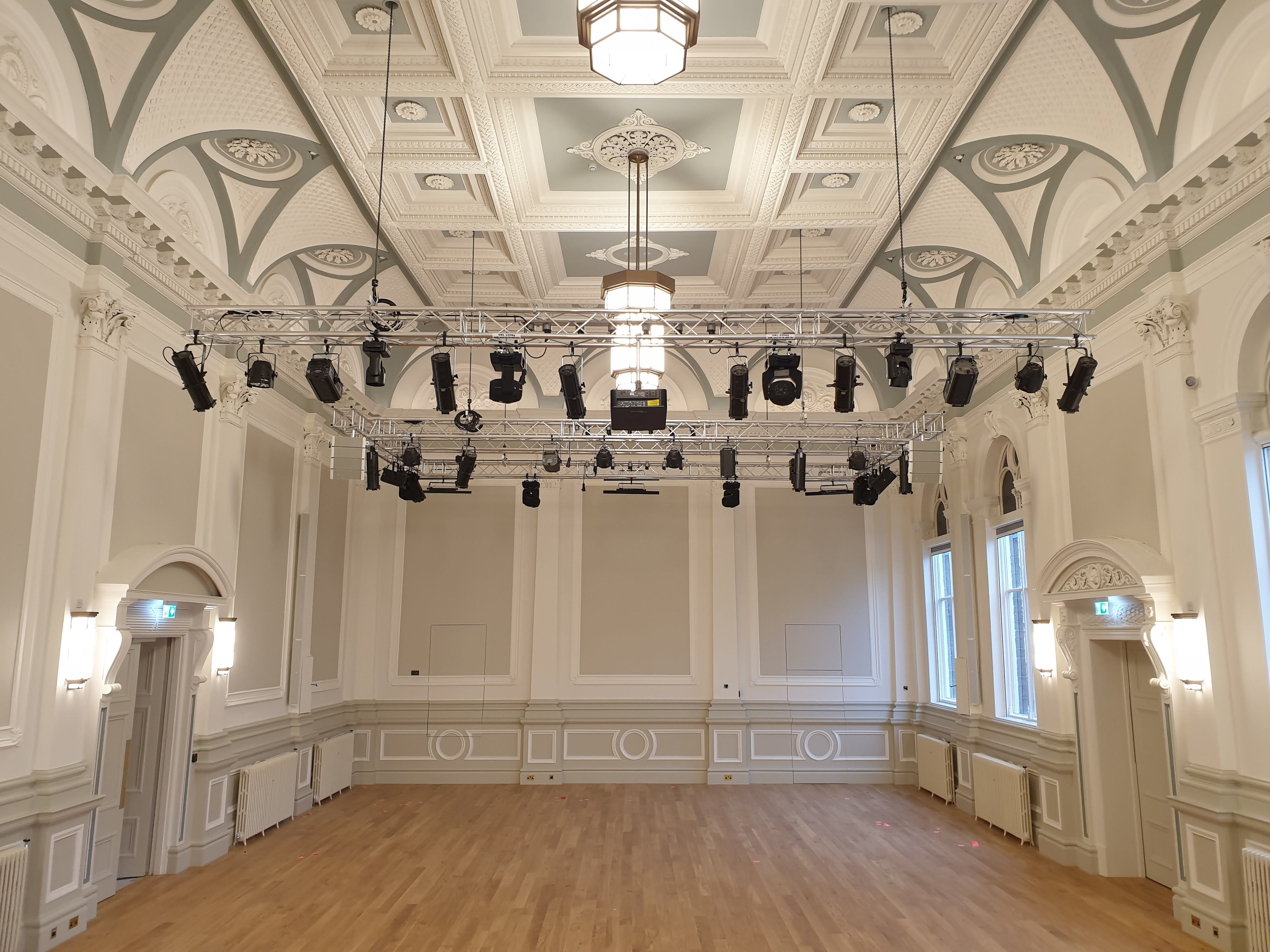
Concert Hall Refurbishment – completed 2021

In the mid-19th century a group of local businessmen decided to form a private company, known as the Skipton Public Buildings Company, to finance and commission a public events venue for the town. The site they selected was occupied by the former vicarage of the Holy Trinity Parish Church.

The new building, designated No. 19 High Street, was designed in the neoclassical style, built in ashlar stone and was completed in 1862. The design involved a symmetrical main frontage of seven bays facing the High street. It featured a two-storey portico, with two Corinthian order columns and two pilasters on the ground floor and four Corinthian order columns on the first floor. The balcony at the front of the building was used to make public announcements. Later the hall and the building next to it, No. 17 High Street, a commercial building became integrated. In 1878, alterations were made to increase the height of the main hall which was used as a public functions room.

In 1895, upon the creation of Skipton Urban District Council, the building was purchased to replace the former town hall situated on Sheep Street. The interior was altered to create a council chamber: the benches and chairs were made by the legendary furniture maker Robert Thompson also known as the "mouseman".

During the 19th century a glass canopy was built onto the front of the Town Hall and lasted until the 1950s, and in 1935 the hall was made larger to accommodate more office space. The town hall continued to be used as a public venue and concert performers included the contralto singer, Kathleen Ferrier, who made an appearance on 27 January 1952. The town hall continued to serve as the headquarters of the urban district council for much of the 20th century and remained the meeting place for the enlarged Craven District Council which was formed in 1974. The new council moved the museum from its previous location at the library to the first floor of the town hall annexe, and a professional museum team were hired to run the museum.

Following the Dibbles Bridge coach crash, in which 33 people died, an inquest was held at the town hall in July 1975; the inquest concluded that the accident was caused by the inability of the driver to negotiate the bend, owing to deficient brakes on the coach, due to possible lack of care in the maintenance of the braking system.

In spring 2019 work started on a redevelopment project, supported by the Heritage Lottery Fund and costing £4.5 million, to restore and upgrade the concert hall, to redesign the museum and to provide new gallery space. The building reopened in 2021. The project has been the recipient of awards including the RIBA Yorkshire Award 2024.

== See also ==
- Listed buildings in Skipton
