= Skipton Golf Club =

Golf club in Skipton, England

- Location within North Yorkshire
- 53°58′29″N 2°1′2″W

Club information
- Location: Skipton, North Yorkshire, England
- Established: 1893
- Tota holes: 18
- Website: www.skiptongolfclub.co.uk

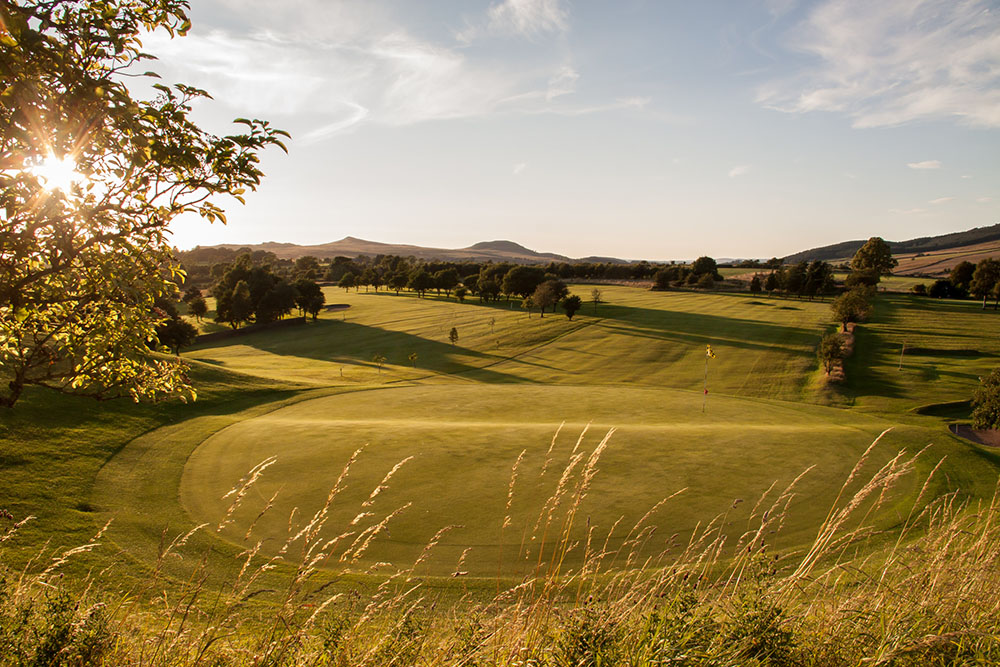
View from the 5th green

Skipton Golf Club is a golf club located within the English county of North Yorkshire. Founded within 1893, the club was originally located a short distance away in the village of Gargrave before moving to its present site just outside the market town of Skipton in 1896.

Eller Beck meanders through the back nine holes, where it acts as a water hazard. In June 2015, work started on the construction of a flood storage reservoir for the beck, which will protect residents in Skipton from flooding, but has a large impact on the golf course. When the scheme was first proposed, the golf club was one of the main objectors to it, as it would require alterations to the 16th and 17th holes, and during a flood event, when water from the beck was impounded in the reservoir, three further holes would be under water. However, agreement was reached on remodelling the golf course following consultation.

== Bibliography ==
- Environment Agency (2014). "Construction of Flood Storage Reservoir on Eller Beck". North Yorkshire County Council.
