= Skipton =

Town in North Yorkshire, England

Coordinates: 53°57′44″N 2°00′59″W

Skipton: The Gateway to the Yorkshire Dales
- Town and civil parish
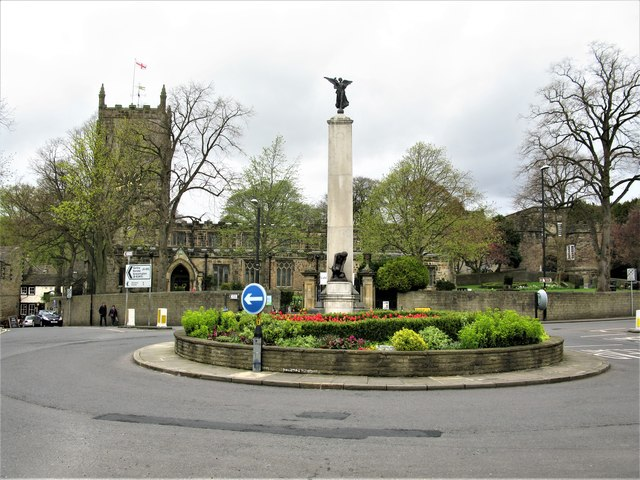
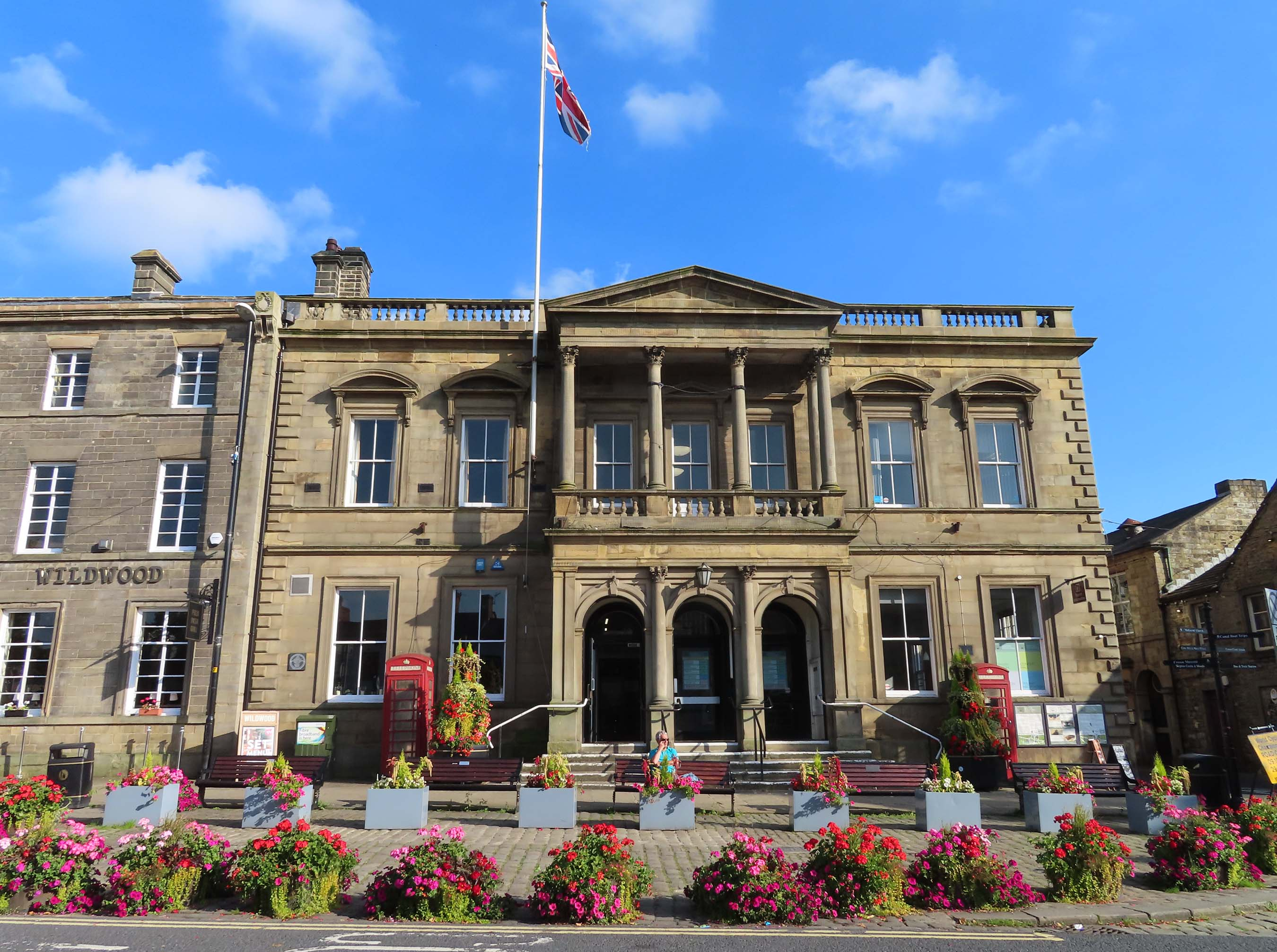
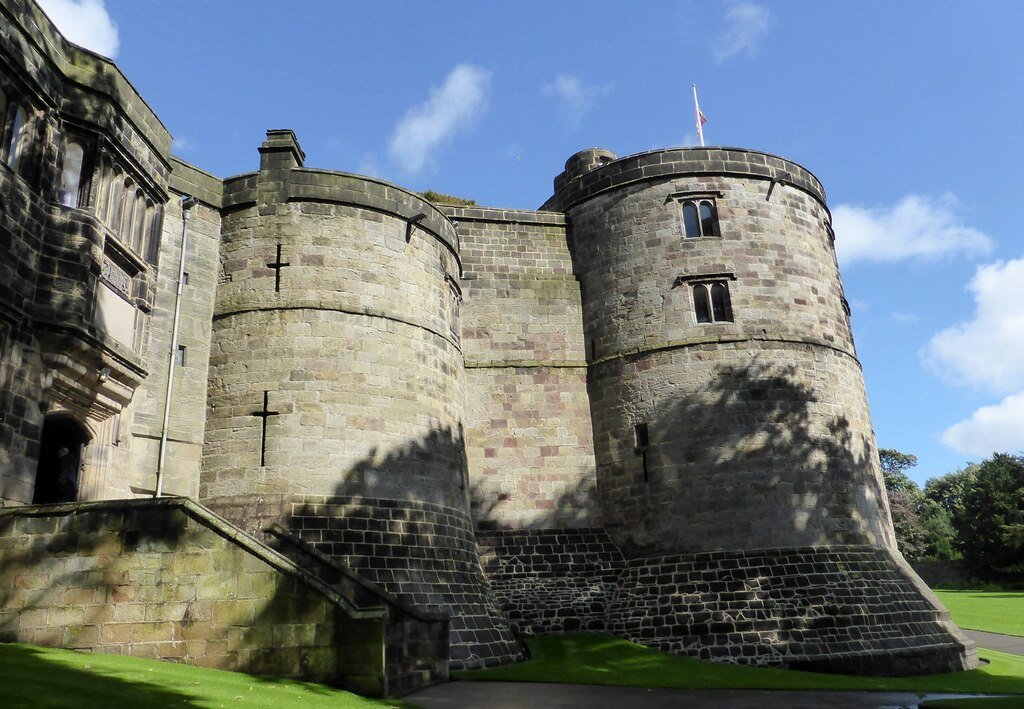
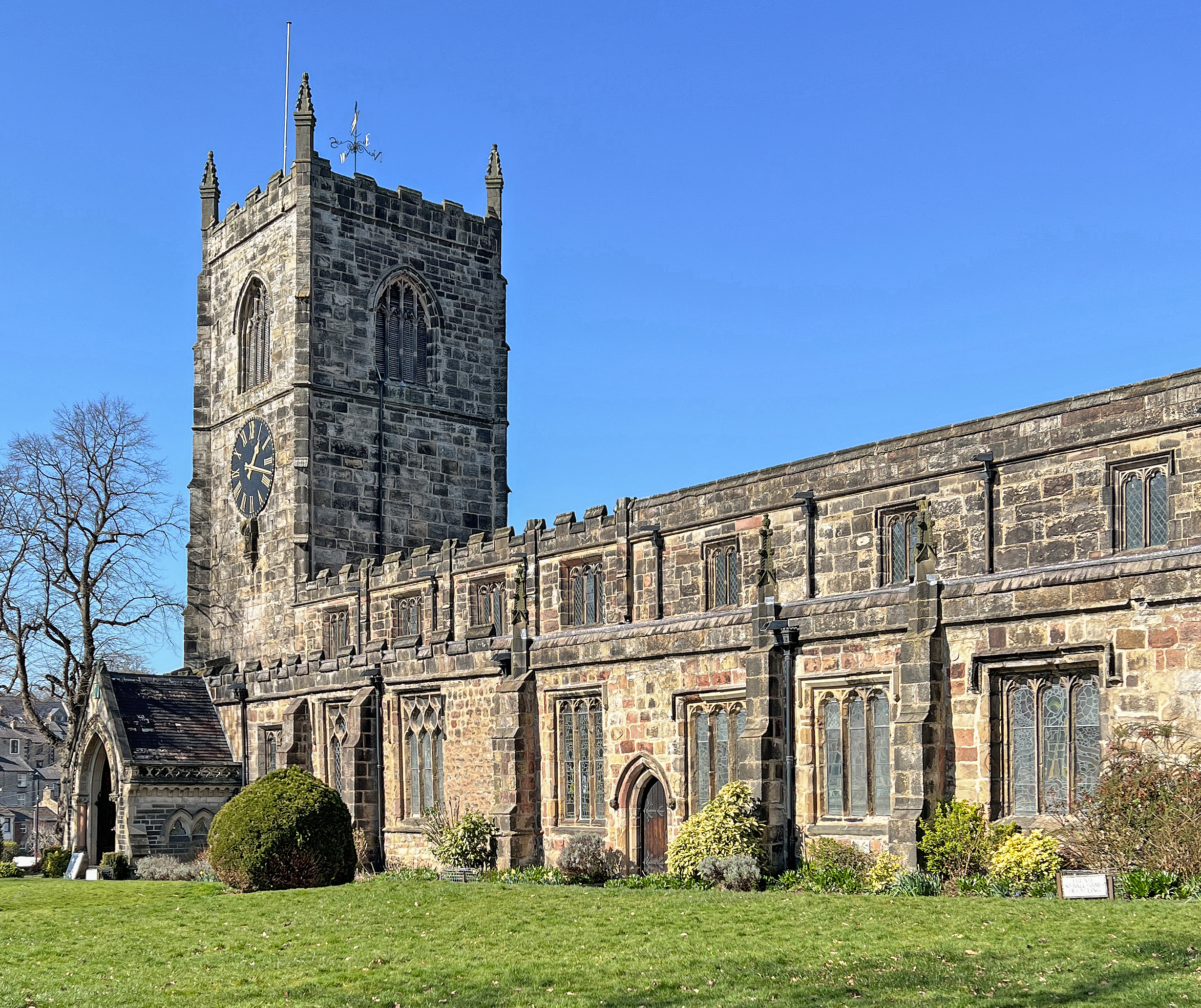
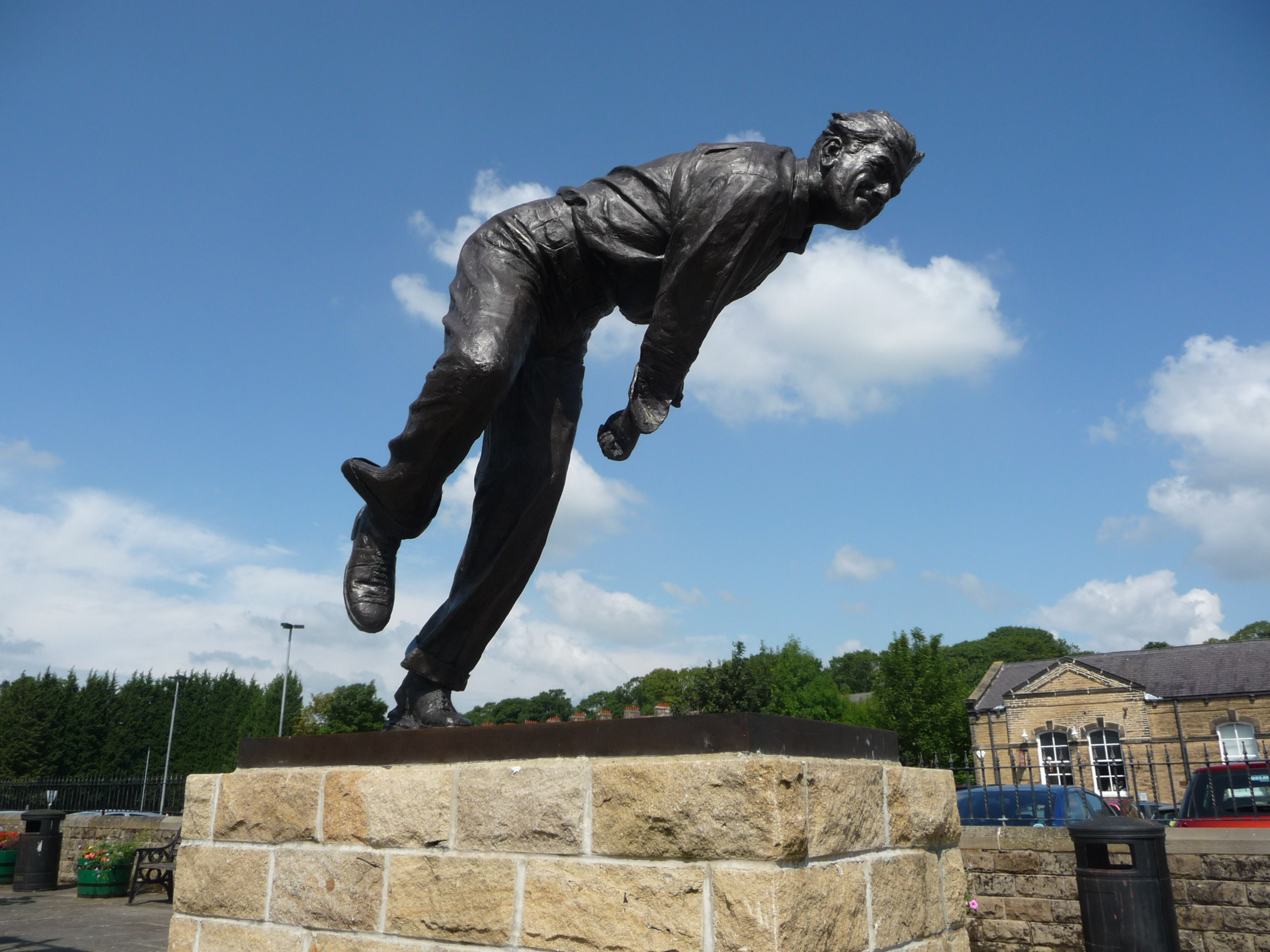
- High Street Town Hall Skipton Castle Holy Trinity Fred Trueman statue

- Location within North Yorkshire
- Population: 15,042 (parish, 2021 census)
- OS grid reference: SD9902851827
  - London: 185 mi (298 km) SE
- Civil parish: Skipton
- Unitary authority: North Yorkshire
- Ceremonial county: North Yorkshire
- Region: Yorkshire and the Humber
- Country: England
- Sovereign state: United Kingdom
- Post town: SKIPTON
- Postcode district: BD23
- Dialling code: 01756
- Police: North Yorkshire
- Fire: North Yorkshire
- Ambulance: Yorkshire
- UK Parliament: Skipton and Ripon
- Website: skiptontowncouncil.gov.uk

Skipton (also known as Skipton-in-Craven) is a market town and civil parish in the modern ceremonial county of North Yorkshire, England. Historically located in the East Division of Staincliffe Wapentake of the West Riding of Yorkshire, Skipton lies generally south of the Yorkshire Dales and is situated on both the River Aire and the Leeds and Liverpool Canal. The town is located 27 miles (43 km) north-west of Leeds and 38 miles (61 km) west of York. In the 2021 Census, the population was recorded as being 15,042. The town has been listed as one of the best and happiest places to live in the UK.

== Etymology ==
The name Skipton means 'sheep-town', a northern dialect form of Shipton. Its name derives from the Old English sceap (sheep) and tun (town or village).

== History ==
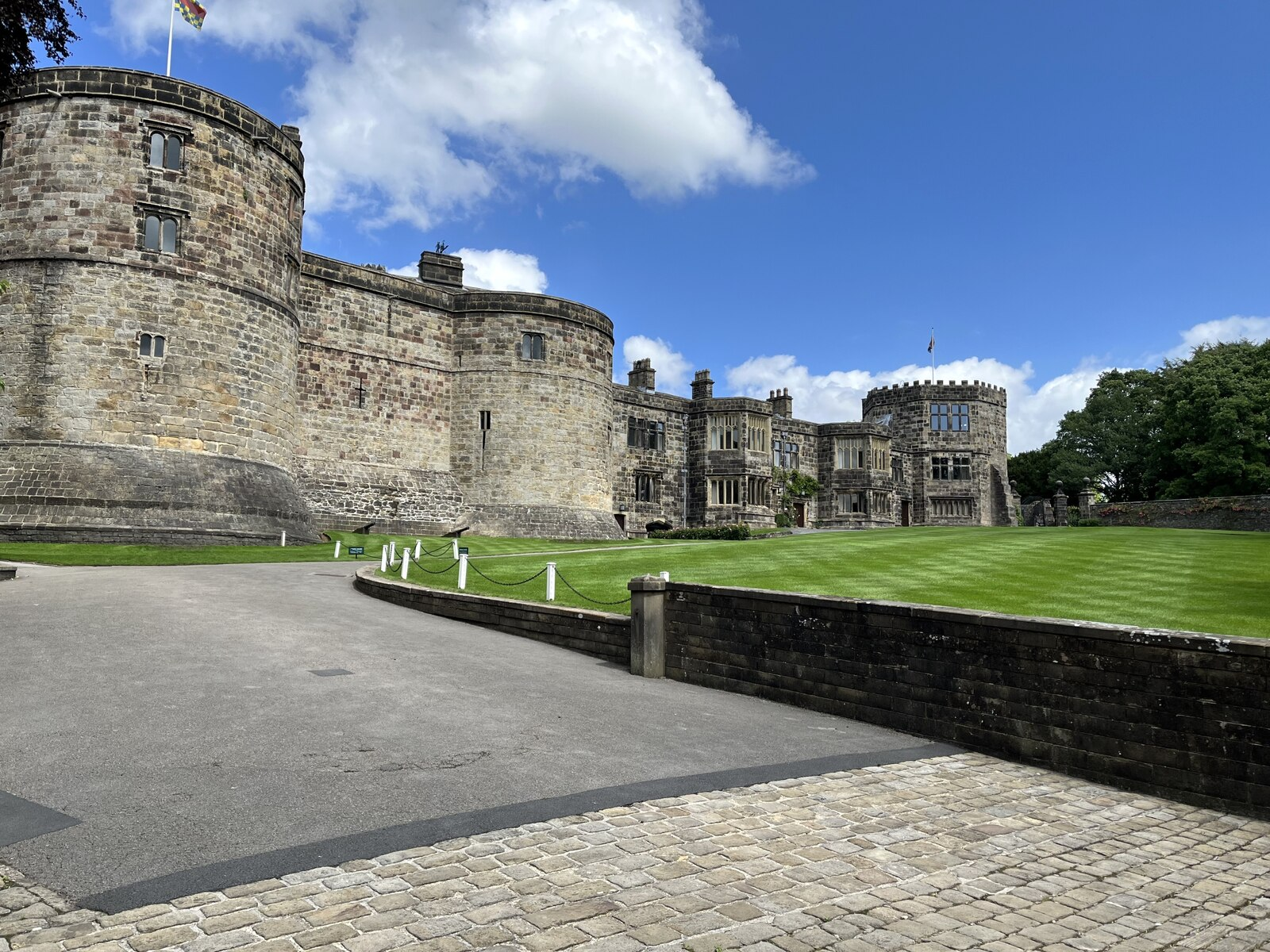
Skipton Castle

Evidence for prehistoric habitation in the Skipton area includes an "important outlying group" of cup and ring marked rocks on Skipton Moor, to the south-east of the town, and in the same area there is an enclosed Iron Age hilltop settlement.

Skipton is recorded in the Domesday Book of 1086. The town was important during the English Civil War, and was the site of prisoner-of-war camps during the First and Second World Wars.

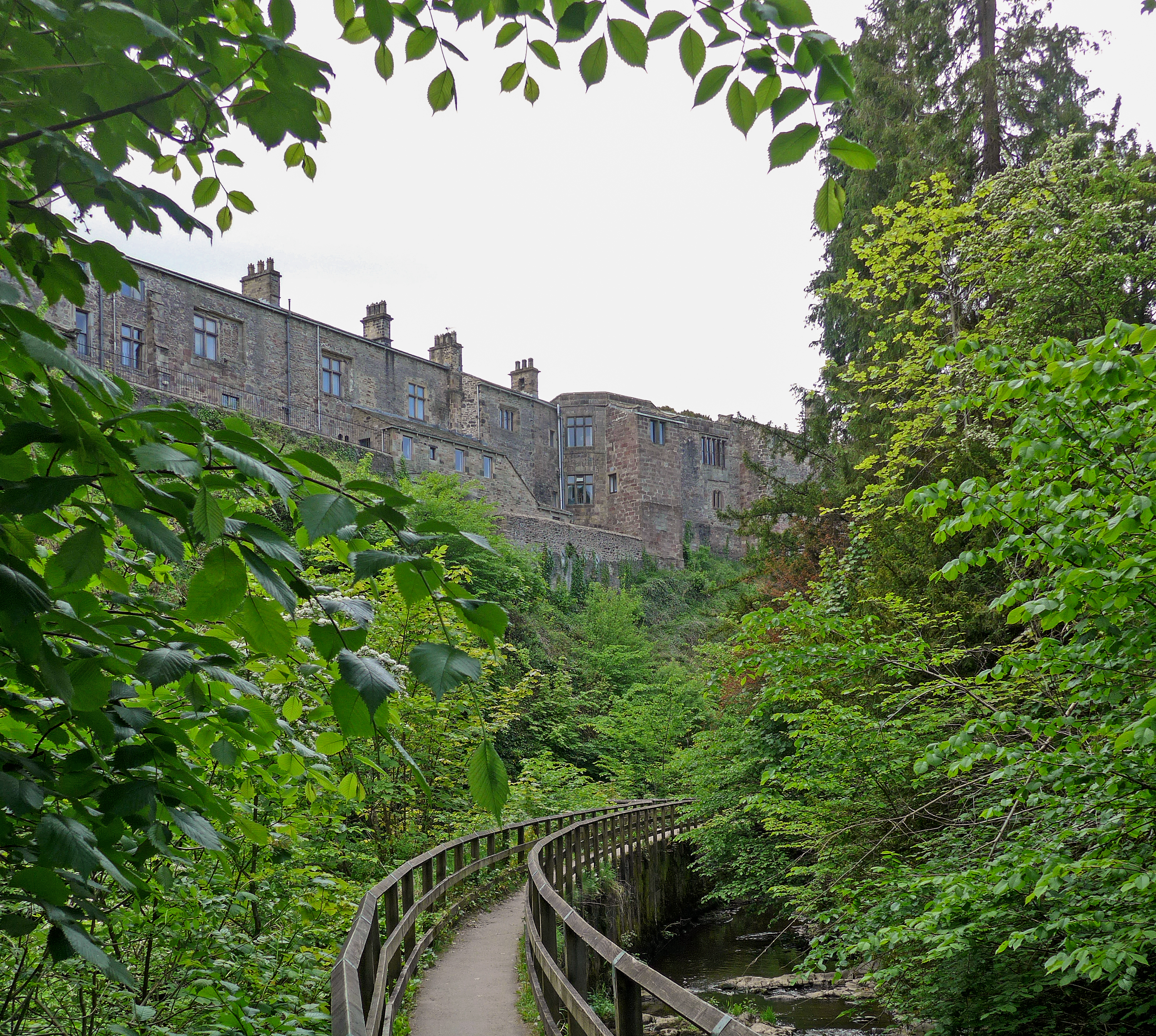
The rear of Skipton Castle

Skipton Castle was built in 1090 as a wooden motte-and-bailey by Robert de Romille, a Norman baron. In the 12th century William le Gros strengthened it with a stone keep to repel attacks from the Kingdom of Scotland to the north, the castle elevated Skipton from a poor dependent village to a burgh administered by a reeve. The protection offered by Skipton Castle during the Middle Ages encouraged the urbanisation of the surrounding area, and during times of war and disorder the town attracted an influx of families. It is now one of the most complete and best preserved medieval castles in England and is open to the public.

One of the oldest mills in North Yorkshire, High Corn Mill, is powered by the waters of Eller Beck. The mill dates to 1310 when it was owned by Robert de Clifford, 1st Baron de Clifford; at that point it was transferred to the powerful Clifford family by the then King Edward II. Skipton became a prosperous market town, trading sheep and woollen goods. A market stemming from its formative years still survives. In the 19th century, Skipton emerged as a small mill town connected to the major cities by the Leeds and Liverpool Canal and its branch Thanet Canal, (known locally as 'Springs branch canal').

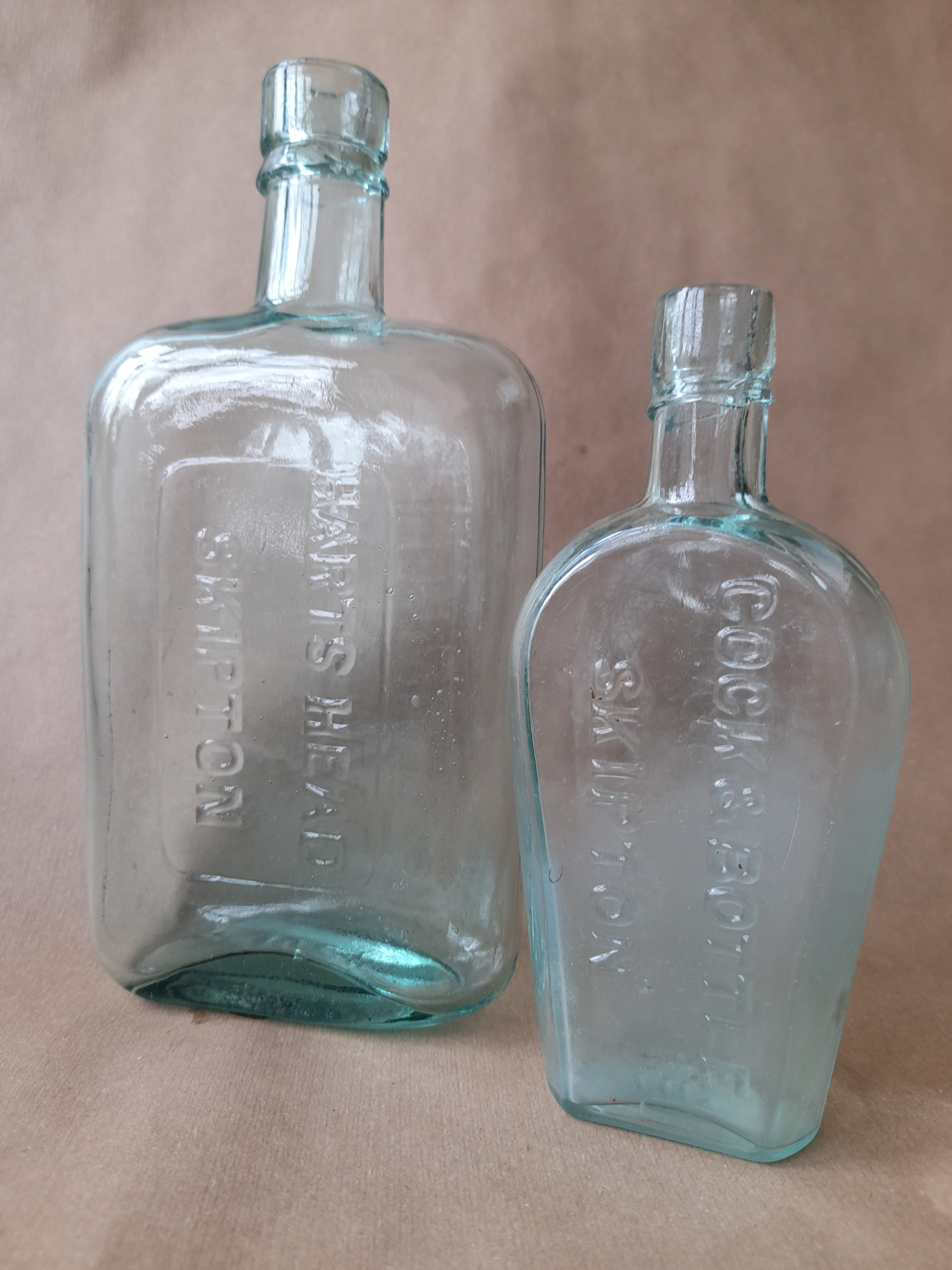
Excavated 19th-century aqua glass spirit flasks from Skipton's Hart and Cock & Bottle public houses.

During the 20th century Skipton's economy shifted to tourism, aided by its historic architecture and proximity to the Yorkshire Dales. Skipton was the seat of Craven District Council from 1974 until April 2023. The Skipton Building Society was founded in the town.

Skipton is twinned with the Bavarian town of Simbach and Erquinghem-Lys in France.

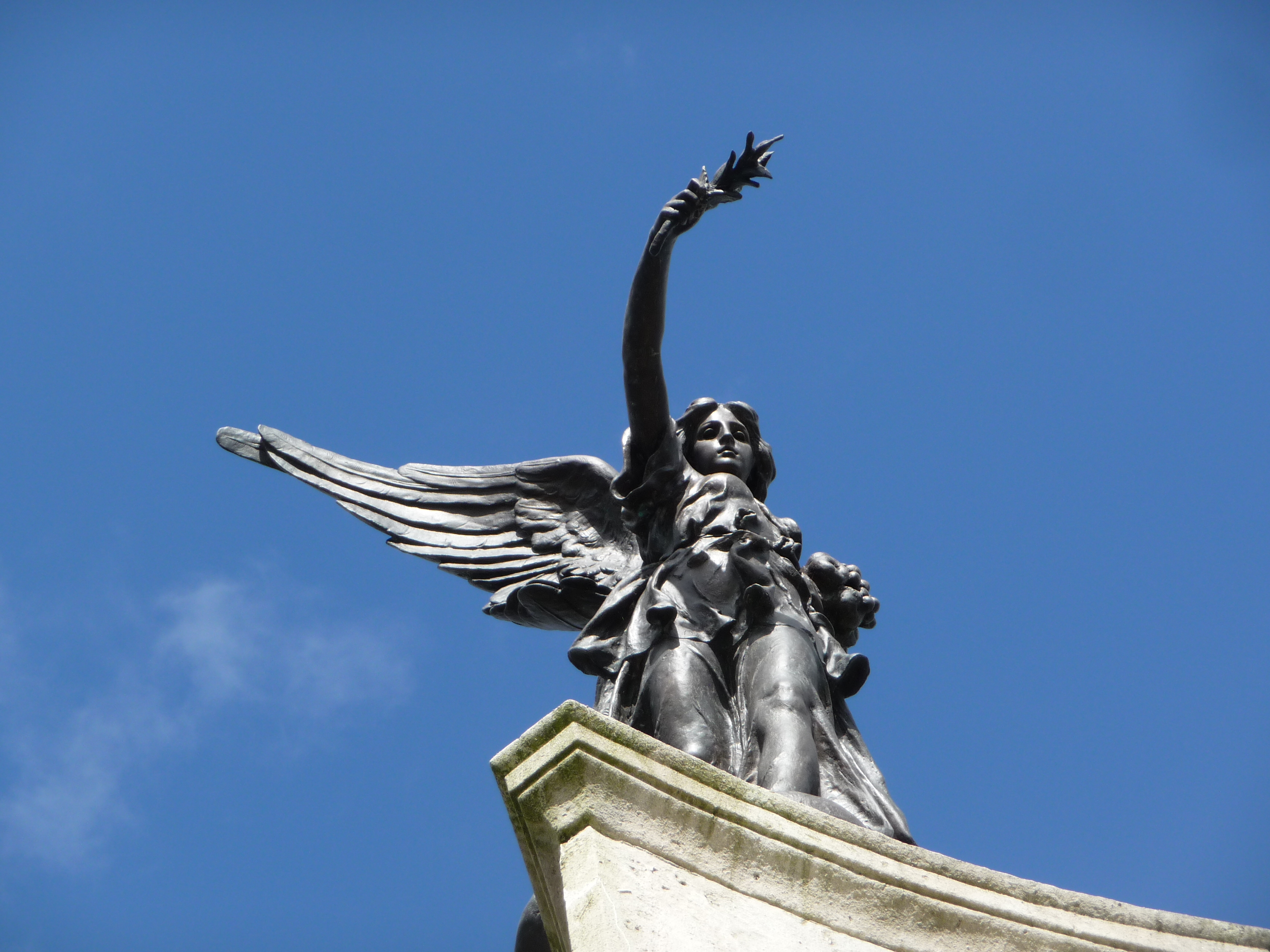
Skipton war memorial

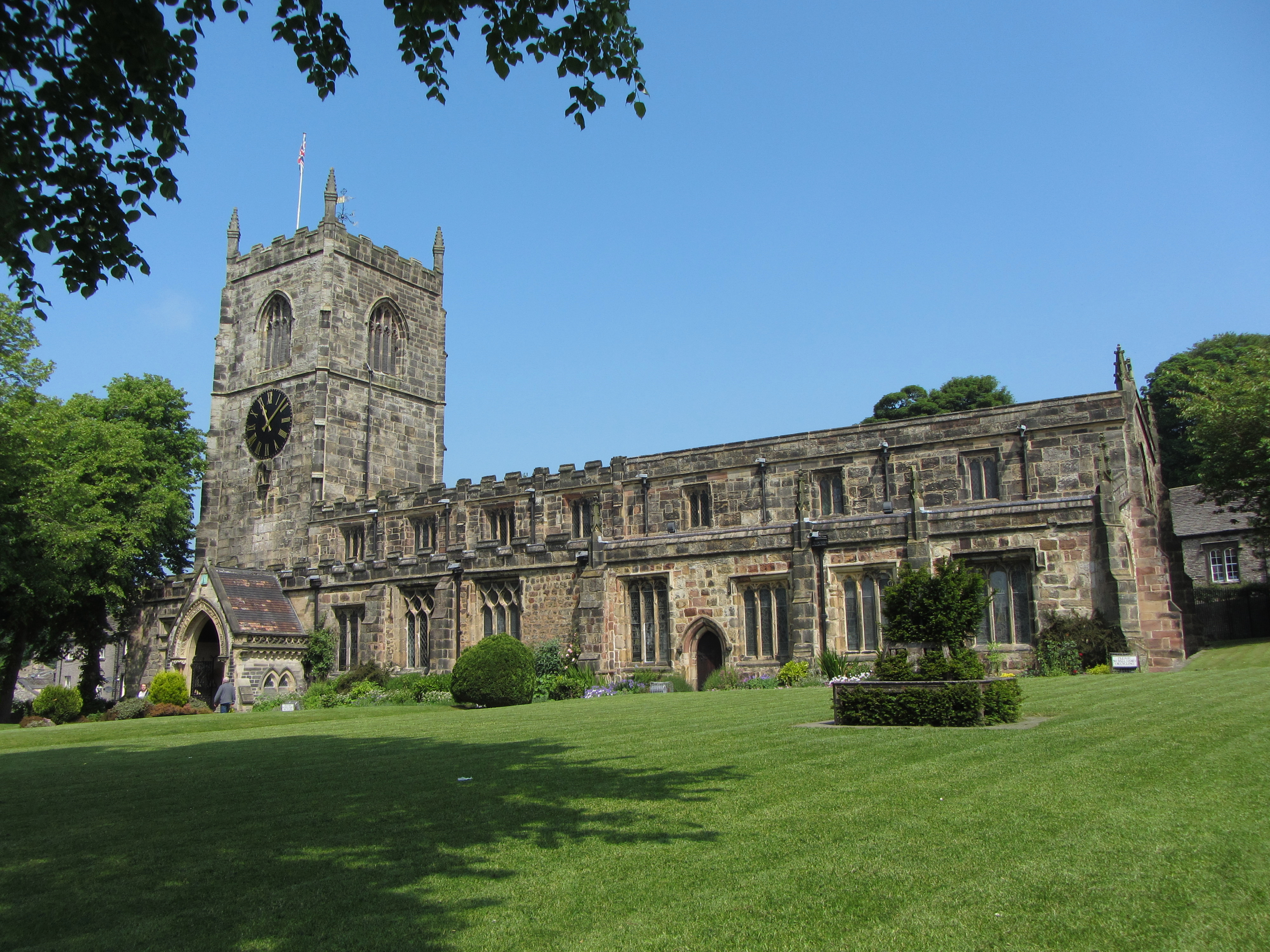
Holy Trinity Church (Church of England)

== Governance ==
Skipton is part of the parliamentary constituency of Skipton and Ripon, which was created in 1983. Since its creation, the constituency has returned a Conservative Member of Parliament (MP). As of 2024, the seat is held by Sir Julian Smith, a former Secretary of State for Northern Ireland. Before 1983 Skipton had its own eponymous constituency.

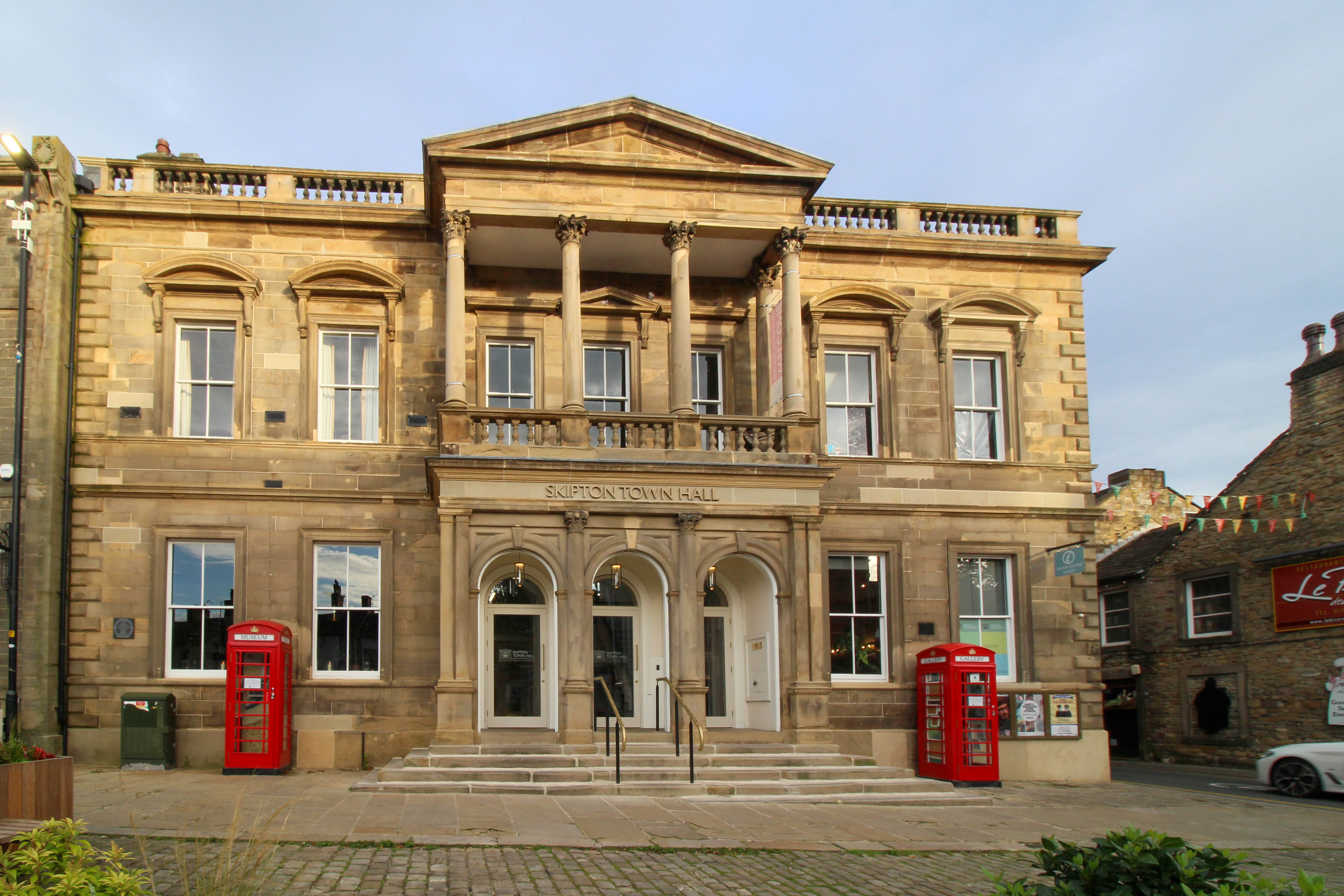
Skipton Town Hall

From 1974 to 2023 Skipton formed part of Craven District, a non-metropolitan district, and was home of the offices of Craven District Council. In 2007, proposals to make North Yorkshire County Council a unitary authority, removing the layer of government represented by Craven District, were rejected. However the council was eventually abolished in 2023, being replaced by North Yorkshire Council.

Skipton has a town council consisting of 16 councillors, formed by four members from each of the four wards within the parish boundaries, North, East, South and West. The council offices are based on the high street, upstairs in the Town Hall. The councillors elect a town mayor each year at an annual general meeting. For 2024 the town mayor was Councillor Mrs Sheila Bentley.

Coat of arms of Arms of Skipton Town Council
Notes Granted to the urban district council on 12 October 1951. Crest On a Wreath of the Colours A Wyvern sejant Gules supporting a Staff proper flying therefrom a Banner barry of eight Or and also Gules thereon a Port between two Towers Argent. Escutcheon Vert a Fleece Or between in chief two Roses Argent barbed and seeded proper a Chief chequy Or and Azure. Motto Industria Et Spe

== Economy ==
The town is known as the 'Gateway to the Dales', because of its close proximity to the Yorkshire Dales. As Skipton is the nearest and largest town to a significant area of the Dales, it attracts numerous visitors, particularly on market days (Monday, Wednesday, Friday and Saturday). Owing to the town's many independent shops and national chains, Skipton has received praise for its enduring individuality and character. In 2008, the Academy of Urbanism voted High Street the best shopping spot in Britain. The wide high street once hosted the sheep market, but now a general market is held there, while livestock is auctioned at the Auction Mart on the western edge of the town.

The town is home to a number of hotels, holiday companies, cottage holiday firms and independent holiday lets. The town is the base for several recruitment agencies, environmental and engineering consultancies and financial and legal services. Skipton is a popular commuter town, with direct trains to Leeds, Bradford and London.

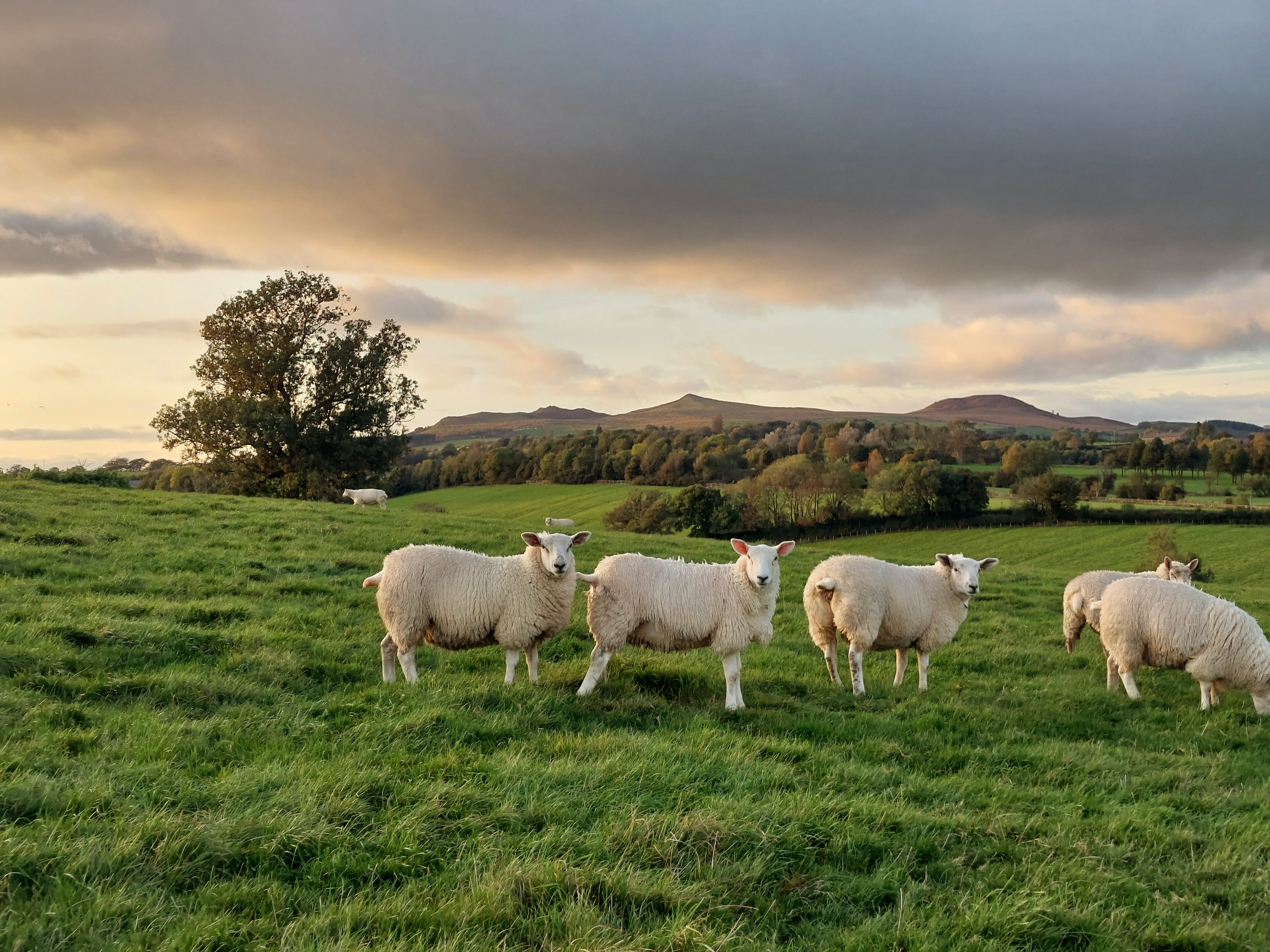
Sheep on Park Hill.

One of the town's larger employers is Skipton Building Society, with its subsidiary companies.

Chocolatier Whitakers, based in the town, was established in 1889 in nearby Cross Hills. Ida Whitaker began making chocolates there in 1903, taught by the wife of the vicar of Kildwick.

== Culture ==
In 2014, The Sunday Times judged Skipton as the 'best place to live' in Britain. In 2017, an annual study of the nation's happiness and wellbeing by the ONS found Craven – which includes the town of Skipton – reported the highest levels of happiness and life satisfaction and the lowest levels of anxiety among residents. In 2018, the town was again listed in The Sunday Times, in their report on the 'Best Places to Live' in northern England. Additionally, the town was twice listed in the UK's top ten happiest places to live in Rightmove's 'Happy at Home Index' in 2020 and 2023. In 2024, the town was again judged by The Sunday Times as one of the best places to live in the UK.

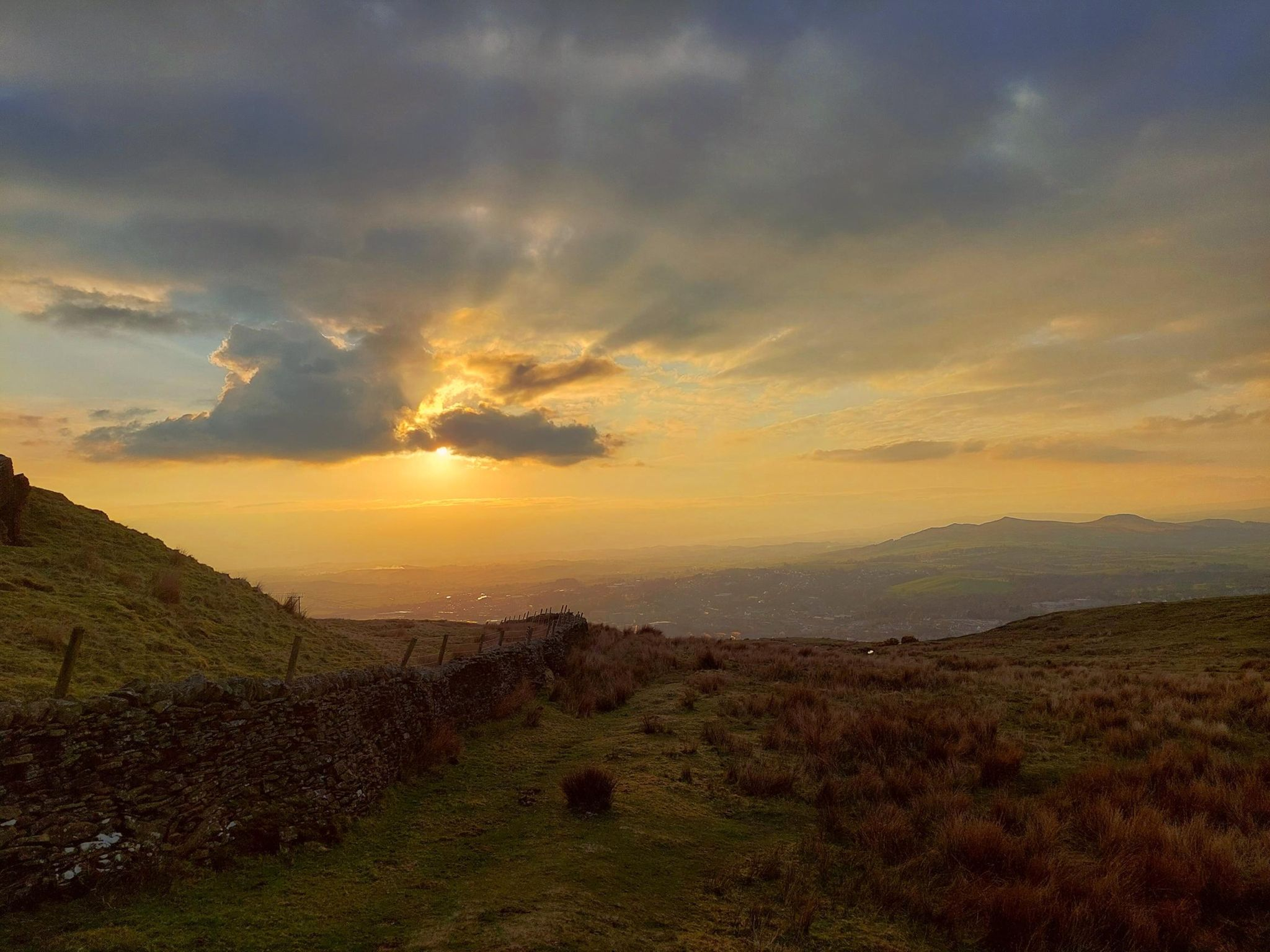
Skipton Moor

Events in Skipton include the annual heritage event 'Skipton Sheep Day' which takes place on the first Sunday in July and celebrates the town's association with sheep. The event takes place on the high street and features a petting zoo, educational shows and a variety of food and drink stalls.

Skipton has an annual gala on the second Saturday of June. The gala begins with a procession through the town centre featuring decorated floats, a marching band and classic cars. The procession ends in Aireville Park with live music performances, a firework display and a variety of stalls. The gala was first held in 1901 to raise money for the Skipton and District Cottage Hospital, but following the formation of the National Health Service, the gala continued raising money for local charities and non-profit-making organisations.

Skipton hosts a Christmas market during which the high street is closed to traffic and the regular market traders are joined by more than 50 additional stall holders. The event features entertainment, live music, a brass band, funfair and the switch-on of the town's Christmas lights.

Skipton Car Show is held annually in June and attracts thousands of spectators. The free show sees hundreds of classic, vintage, rare and exotic vehicles exhibited on the town's closed high street. Police vehicles are also displayed alongside demonstrations from the town's fire service.

Skipton Town Hall holds events and performances such as music, theatre and comedy, as well as markets and fairs. In 2021, the building received funding from the National Lottery and Craven District Council to undergo a refurbishment. It is also home to the Craven Museum & Gallery which has won numerous awards and in 2024 was shortlisted for the Art Fund Museum of the Year Award.

The town has two theatres. The Mart Theatre located in Craven Cattle Mart opened in October 2005 with funding from the European Regional Development Fund, Yorkshire Forward, Craven District Council and the Arts Council England. It provides rural theatre, events and other facilities. Skipton Little Theatre is a smaller 70-seater theatre located on Clifford Street and operated by a not-for-profit group. The theatre is the home of Skipton Players, the town's amateur dramatics society.

Craven Arts is an organisation founded in 2017 by experienced local artists which supports the arts and operates centres in the town for exhibitions, events and creative workshops. In December 2022, with funding from Craven District Council, English Heritage, Heritage Action Zone, Arts Council England and Architectural Heritage Fund, Craven Arts renovated the former Parish Church school located on Otley Street and opened an arts centre. Named 'Craven Arts House', the centre provides studio space, classrooms, meeting rooms, a community hall, green screen room and recording studio. The organisation also operates a small shop, on Otley Street, selling works from local artists.

Skipton has a public library, and three bookshops; an Oxfam bookshop, selling secondhand books for charity, Keogh's Books, a secondhand and antiquarian bookseller, and The Little Bookshop, sellers of new books. From 1979, the Box of Delights bookshop on Otley Street served the town for almost 40 years, before closing in 2018.

Skipton has a hospitality sector, with around 85 public houses, cafés, coffee shops, bars and restaurants. These establishments serve a wide range of food and drink in various settings, from restaurants specialising in world cuisines to traditional Yorkshire pubs.

The town is home to the independent Plaza Cinema on Sackville Street, a cinema showing a varied programme, from arthouse movies to big releases from major studios. The cinema plays host to Skipton Film Club and the annual Hinterlands film festival.

The town has four allotment sites. Three are operated by Skipton Town Council and include two large sites, one in the Middletown area and another on Broughton Road, alongside a smaller site at Burnside Chapel. A fourth independent allotment site is located behind the town's Plaza Cinema.

The local newspaper is the Craven Herald & Pioneer, with a history stretching back to 1853. Local news and television programmes are provided by BBC Yorkshire and ITV Yorkshire. Local radio stations are BBC Radio York, Drystone Radio and Your Skipton Radio.

== Transport ==
=== Railway ===
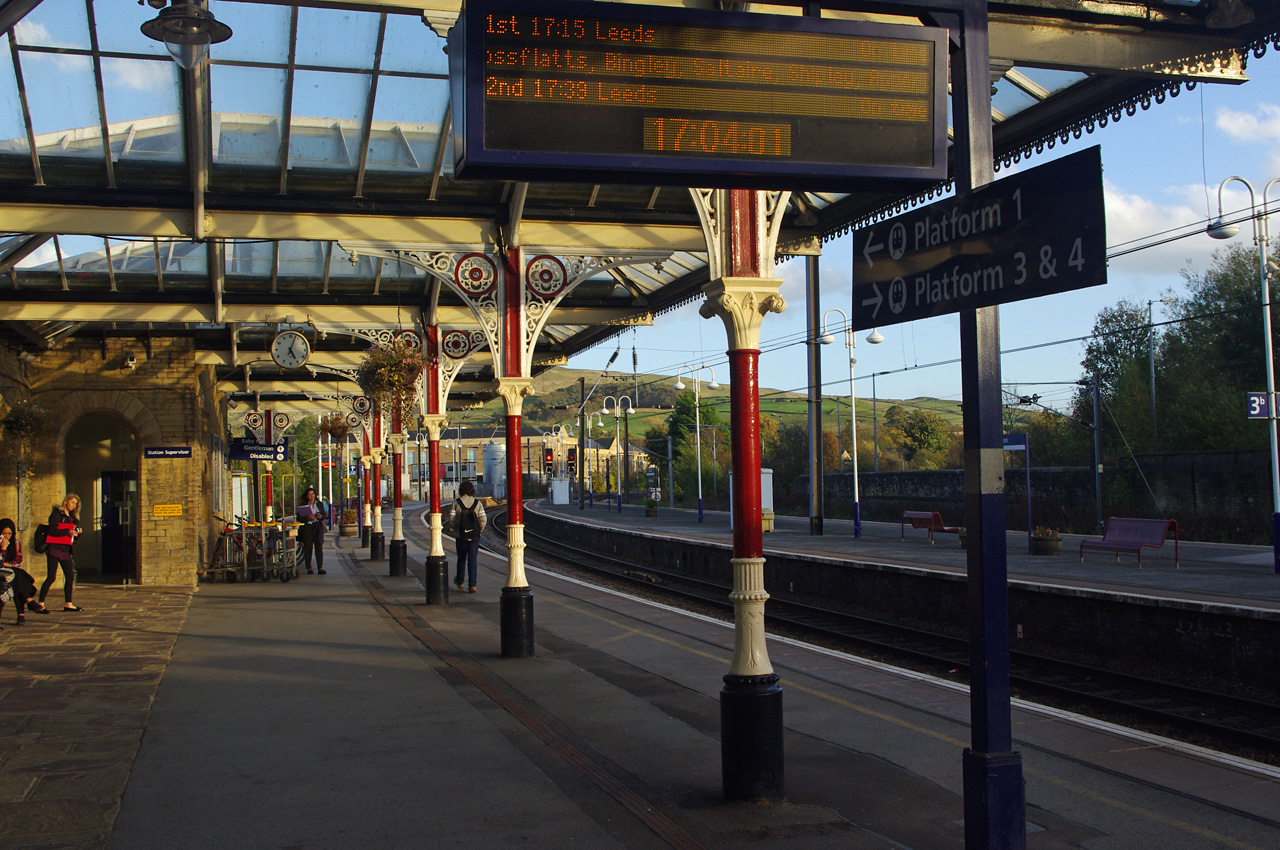
Skipton railway station

Skipton railway station is managed by Northern Trains and is served by the following routes:

- The electrified Airedale Line provides regular services to Keighley, Bradford Forster Square and Leeds, operated by Northern Trains
- Northbound services connect to Lancaster, Morecambe, Settle and Carlisle; these are operated by Northern Trains. The route to Carlisle includes the scenic Settle-Carlisle line, passing over the Ribblehead Viaduct
- London North Eastern Railway operates a daily return service to London King's Cross, via Leeds.

=== Buses ===
Skipton bus station on Keighley Road was rebuilt in 2009 and is the focal point for bus services throughout the local area. Key routes link the town with Burnley, Clitheroe, Grassington, Harrogate, Ilkley, Keighley, Malham, Preston and Settle. Services are operated by Stagecoach Merseyside & South Lancashire, Harrogate Bus Company, Keighley Bus Company, Lonsdale Buses and North Yorkshire Council.

=== Roads ===
Skipton lies close to the junction of the A65 road (from Leeds to the Lake District) and the A59 (from York to Liverpool). The northern section (A65 & A59) of the £16.4 million Skipton by-pass opened in December 1981; the rest of the 6 miles (10 km) route (A629) opened in October 1982, greatly reducing journey times to the Dales.

The M65 motorway signs Skipton as an eastbound destination from its eastern junctions in Burnley, but terminates at Colne; the route to Skipton continues as the A56 as far as its terminating roundabout with the A59.

=== Water ===
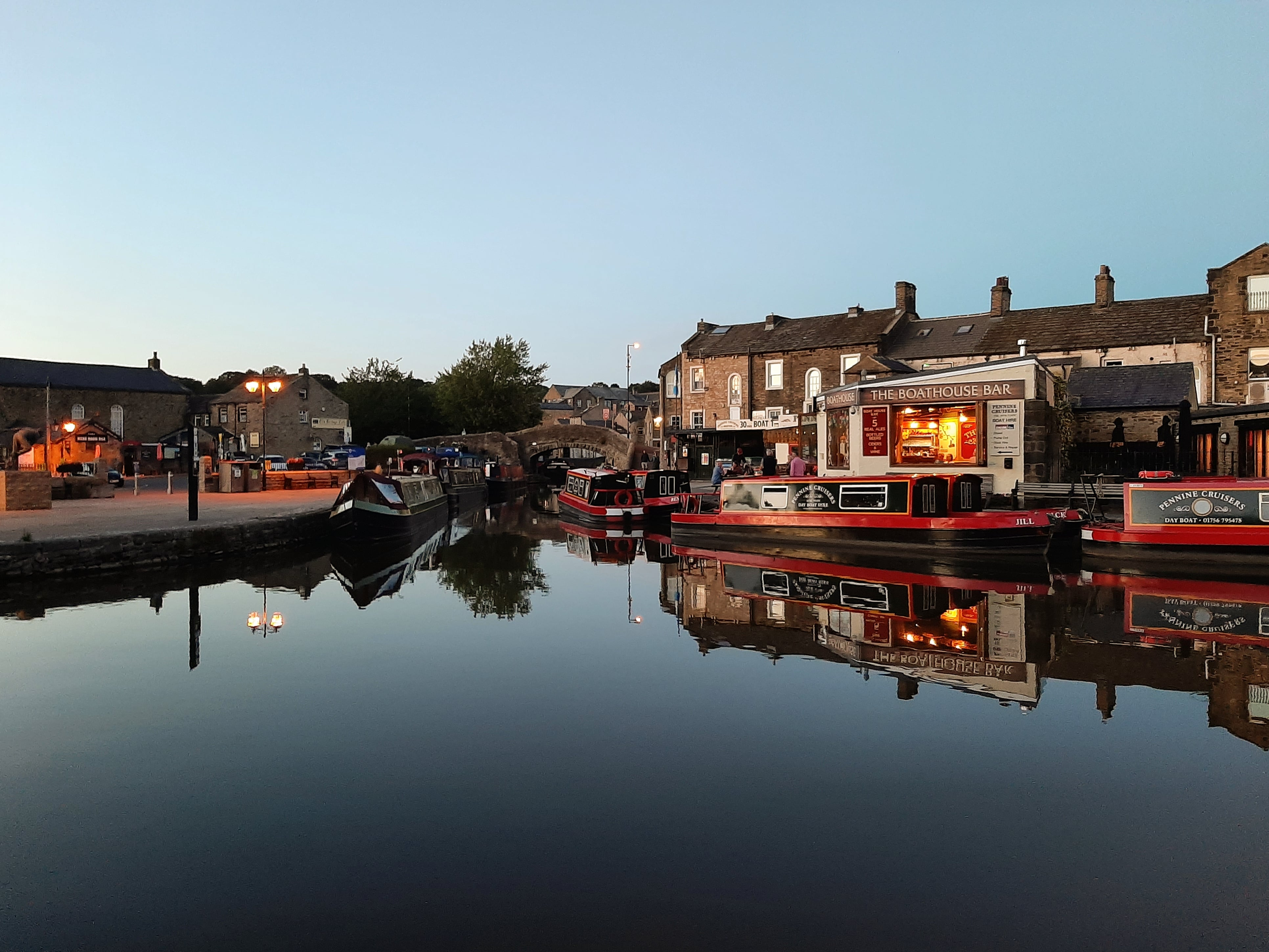
Skipton Canal Basin

The Leeds and Liverpool Canal runs through Skipton and is a popular destination for tourists, with walking and boat hire.

== Education ==
=== Primary education ===
- Non-denominational:
  - Greatwood Community Primary School
  - Water Street Community Primary School
- Roman Catholic:
  - St Stephen's Catholic Primary School
- Church of England:
  - Christ Church Primary School
  - Parish Church Primary School

=== Secondary education ===
As well as The Skipton Academy (ages 11–16), there are two single-sex grammar schools: Ermysted's Grammar School for boys and Skipton Girls' High School (SGHS). Both schools are selective by entrance exam and have obtained comparable high A-Level scores. On the basis of the 2009 A level results, Ermysted's performed 13th best in the UK and SGHS was rated 42nd but, in 2011, it was rated at number 44.

=== Further education ===
Craven College is sited next to The Skipton Academy.

== Sport ==
Skipton is home to Skipton Town A.F.C.; Skipton Juniors F.C.; Skipton Cricket Club, Skipton Church Institute Cricket Club and Skipton Kashmir, all cricket clubs; Skipton Cycling Club; Skipton Swimming Club; Skipton Athletics Club; Skipton Karate Centre; Strike Taekwondo; Craven Energy Triathlon Club; Skipton R.F.C., a rugby union club and Skipton Golf Club, founded in 1893. The Coulthurst Craven Sports Centre is adjacent to the rugby club, with facilities including all-weather football pitches and squash courts. Skipton Tennis Club is also adjacent to the Sports Centre and has been awarded the LTA Club of the Year Award on several occasions. There are a number of gyms in the town, a public swimming pool, an outdoor skatepark and a pump track. Skipton is host to a free weekly Parkrun event which takes place in Aireville Park.

On 5 July 2014, the Tour de France Stage 1 from Leeds to Harrogate passed through the town.

== Notable people ==
A number of notable people have been born in Skipton. The philosopher Henry Sidgwick was born in 1838. Thomas Spencer, the co-founder of Marks & Spencer, was born in Queen's Court in 1858. The American mathematician Thomas William Edmondson was born in 1869. Geoffrey Dawson, editor of The Times from 1912 to 1919 and from 1923 until 1941, was born in 1874.

Two politicians were born in Skipton: the former Conservative MP and Chancellor of the Exchequer Iain Macleod in 1913, and the Labour MP Joan Humble in 1951. Former British Prime Minister Winston Churchill's personal physician during the Second World War, Charles Wilson, the first Baron Moran, was born in Skipton in 1882.

The poet and author Blake Morrison was born in Skipton in 1950. The former Manchester City footballer Rick Holden was born in Skipton in 1964. The actress Elaine Glover, who appeared in Footballers' Wives and HolbyBlue, was born in Skipton in 1983. Former Lancashire and England cricketer and coach, Glen Chapple was born in Skipton in 1974. Former England and Leicestershire cricketer, and current England national selector, James Whitaker was born in Skipton in 1962.

- Nick Hitchon (1957–2023), nuclear fusion scientist and professor, whose life was profiled in the Up documentary film series, was born in Skipton.
- Rhoda Bloodworth (1889–1980), New Zealand labour activist, community worker and feminist, born in Skipton.

== See also ==
- Listed buildings in Skipton
- Craven Heifer
- Plaza Cinema, Skipton
