= Draughton, North Yorkshire =

Village and civil parish in North Yorkshire, England

Coordinates: 53.967930°N 1.941810°W

Draughton
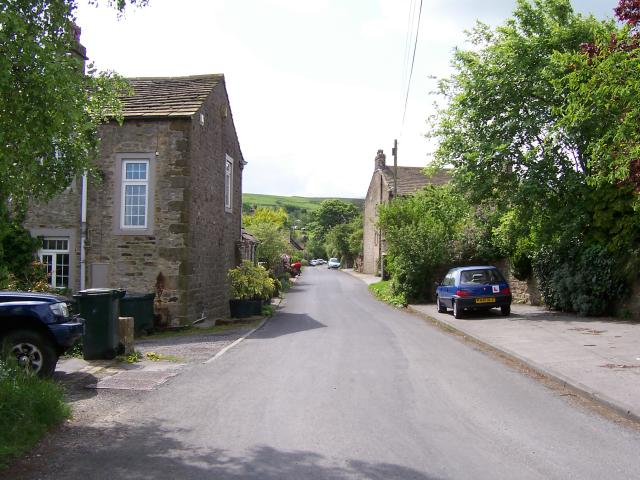
- The village's main street in the summer of 2007.

- Location within North Yorkshire
- Population: 270
- OS grid reference: SE039524
- Civil parish: Draughton
- Unitary authority: North Yorkshire
- Ceremonial county: North Yorkshire
- Region: Yorkshire and the Humber
- Country: England
- Sovereign state: United Kingdom
- Post town: SKIPTON
- Postcode district: BD23
- Police: North Yorkshire
- Fire: North Yorkshire
- Ambulance: Yorkshire
- UK Parliament: Skipton and Ripon

Draughton (/ˈdræftən/ DRAF-tən) is a village and civil parish east of Skipton in North Yorkshire, England. In 2015, the population of the parish was 270. The boundaries of the parish extend beyond the village proper: eastwards they go to the River Wharfe, including ancient woodland. The village dates back to the time of the Domesday book and has several listed buildings. The civil parish lies next to both Yorkshire Dales National Park and to the Nidderdale Area of Outstanding Natural Beauty. The ground the parish sits on includes mudstone and limestone.

The A65 road crosses through the centre of the civil parish and by the village; the A59 road is just outside the northward boundary. The parish includes Bolton Abbey railway station. The civil parish is administered by a parish council comprising seven members; in the North Yorkshire Council it is represented by Wharfedale ward; and at the House of Commons by the constituency of Skipton and Ripon.

Until 1974 it was part of the West Riding of Yorkshire. From 1974 to 2023 it was part of the Craven District, but it is now administered by the unitary North Yorkshire Council.

== Name ==
Draughton has been historically written in various forms, including Dracton in the Domesday Book, and later Drahton, Draython, and Draghton. It was spelled Draughton as early as 1423. The name includes the Old Danish drag, meaning a slope or a portage, and the Old English tūn, simply meaning a dwelling-place or settlement. The Old Danish part may have replaced another Old English element, dræg, meaning a portage or path.

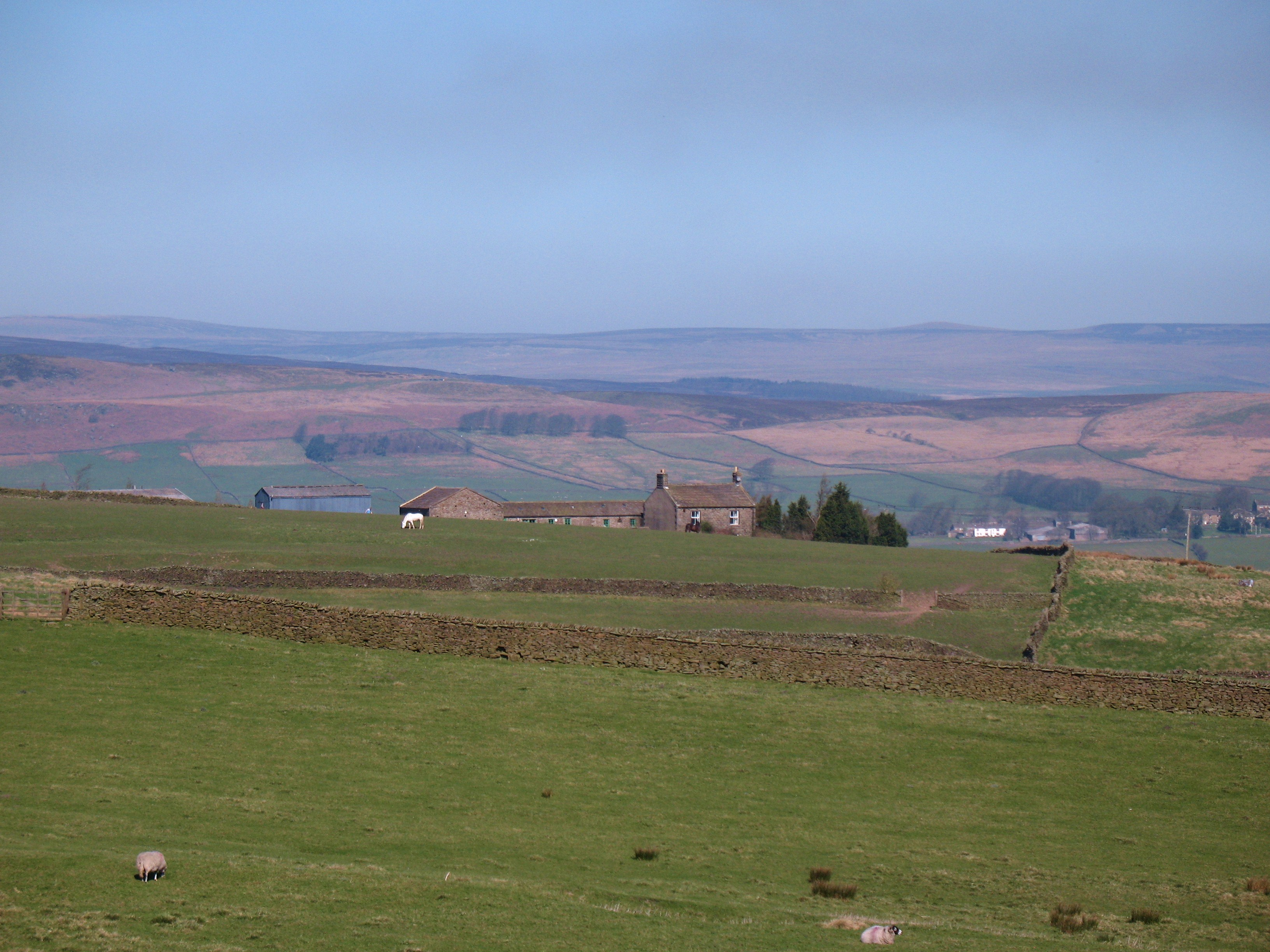
Upland near the village of Draughton

== Geography ==
Draughton is located east of Skipton. The boundaries of the civil parish extend around and to the east of the village proper, and include the Chelker Reservoir. To the east, the parish extends about 1.9 miles (3 km) to the River Wharfe and includes three hills and some pockets of ancient woodland; the hamlet of Bolton Bridge, outside the parish boundaries, marks the north-east corner. The parish boundaries extend 1.2 miles (2 km) to the south of the village, and include Draughton moor. Northwards and westwards, the parish boundaries follow becks.

The parish of Draughton is surrounded to the north by Yorkshire Dales National Park, to the east by the Nidderdale Area of Outstanding Natural Beauty, and to the south by the Bradford green belt.

=== Transport ===
The heritage Embsay and Bolton Abbey Steam Railway passes near the village, and that line's Bolton Abbey Railway station lies within the parish boundaries. The A59 road lies just outside of the parish's northern boundary, while the A65 passes through the centre of the parish.

Work on the A65 bypass started in early December 1990, by Shand Construction, costing £2.18 million. It was one mile, to open in March 1992. The bypass was opened in mid-December 1991 by the Chairman of the county council, Angela Harris.

The main street of the village, Low Lane, runs roughly north–south; there is a small stream that runs just east of the village. The A65 road marks the bottom of the settled area. There is a church named after Saint Augustine in the village.

The Dales Way passes through the parish's area, in the segment that connects the village of Addingham with Bolton Abbey. In 2024, a new footpath was added to take walkers off the B6160 road east of the village proper, near Bolton Bridge.

=== Geology ===
The village itself sits mostly on carboniferous mudstone, part of the Hodder Mudstone formation, and is partially surrounded by large patchy swathes of limestone dating to the same era. The rest of the parish is more geologically diverse: a large area to the east of the village is shale, followed by sandstone around the River Wharfe.

== Population ==
Historical population
Year	Pop.	±% p.a.
1881	178	—
1891	204	+1.37%
1901	205	+0.05%
1911	166	−2.09%
1921	155	−0.68%
1931	124	−2.21%
1951	133	+0.35%
1961	118	−1.19%
1971	191	+4.93%
2015	270	+0.79%

The population of the civil parish was 270 in 2015. In 1911, it was 166; this continued to decline during the 20th century until an increase by 1971.

== History ==
The village was recorded in the Domesday Book. In St. Augustine’s Church, there is a plaque honouring the four men from Draughton who died in the First World War, and the one man who died in the Second World War. The Draughton post office was closed in 2008. In 2022, disinfection measures were temporarily introduced to a water treatment plant near Draughton to help improve the water quality of a swimming spot at Ilkley in the River Wharfe, after a report that May showed that the river at Ilkley had the lowest water quality in the UK that summer.

=== Heritage ===
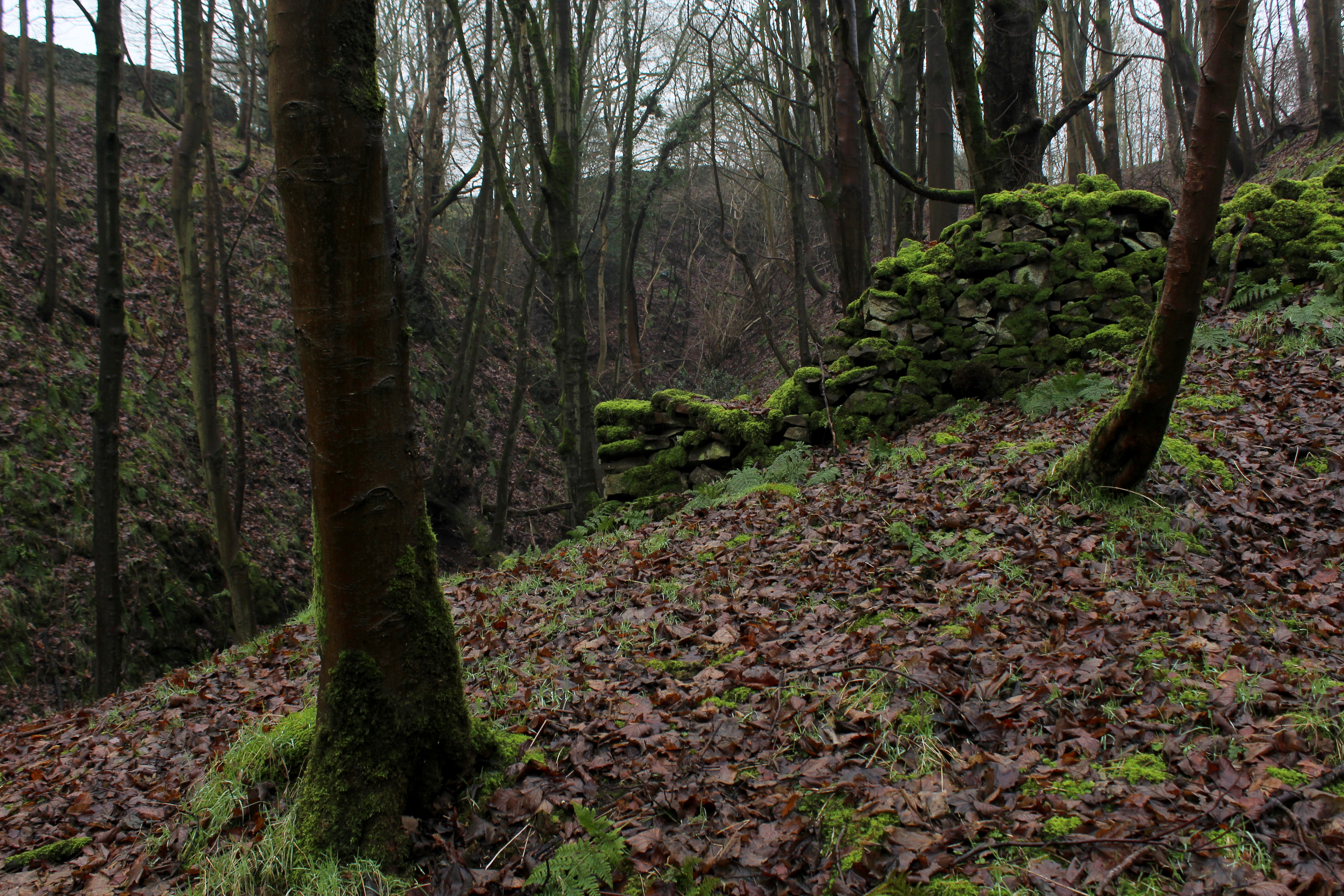
Lob Wood, an ancient woodland in the civil parish

There are several listed buildings in the parish of Draughton, including buildings and boundary stones. The Flat Bridge, which takes the B6160 road over a stream, was built around 1800. Besides five boundary stones and other markers, there is also an 18th-century farmhouse, a lime kiln, and a house dating to around 1810. In addition, there are two ancient woodlands – forests which have existed since 1600 – within the parish, Lob Wood and Eller Carr Wood.

== Politics ==
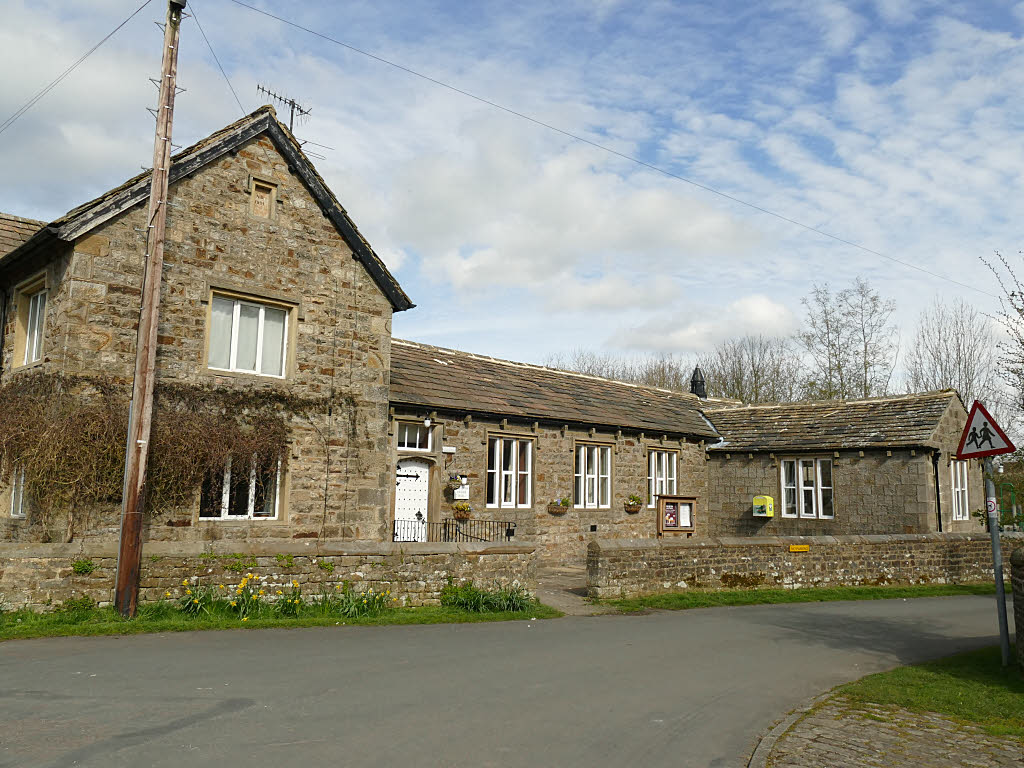
The Draughton village hall

As a civil parish, Draughton is administered on the lowest level of local government by a parish council. The Draughton parish council has seven members who are elected to four year terms. At the second level of local government – the North Yorkshire Council, which is a unitary authority – Draughton is part of the Wharfedale ward. At the national level, the parish is represented by the constituency of Skipton and Ripon.
