= The Tithe Barn, Bolton Abbey =

Historic building in Bolton Abbey, North Yorkshire, England

Coordinates: 53°58′50″N 1°53′27″W

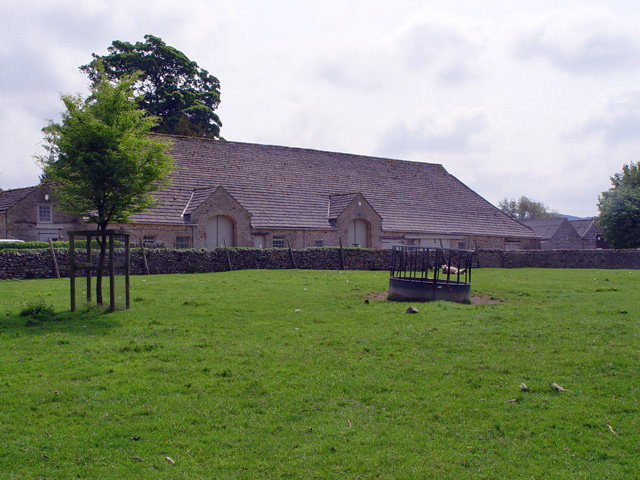
The building in 2008

The Tithe Barn is a historic building in the village of Bolton Abbey, in North Yorkshire in England.

The building was probably constructed in the 16th century, as the tithe barn of Bolton Priory. It was Grade II* listed in 1954. In 2019, it was converted into a wedding venue by the Cripps Barn Group, the work including a new bat house for the Natterer and Pipistrelle bats which nested in the barn. The conversion won a Regional Conservation Award from the Royal Institute of British Architects. Historic England describe the building as "a very unusual survival in the north of England".

The single-storey building is built of stone, with a stone slate roof. It is ten bays long. On the front are two double doors with segmental arches in half-dormers, and there are other later openings. The interior is aisled, with nine king-post frames. The fifth bay has a threshing floor.

== See also ==
- Grade II* listed buildings in North Yorkshire (district)
- Listed buildings in Bolton Abbey
