= Bolton Abbey Hall =

House in Bolton Abbey, North Yorkshire, England

Coordinates: 53.9839°N 1.8902°W

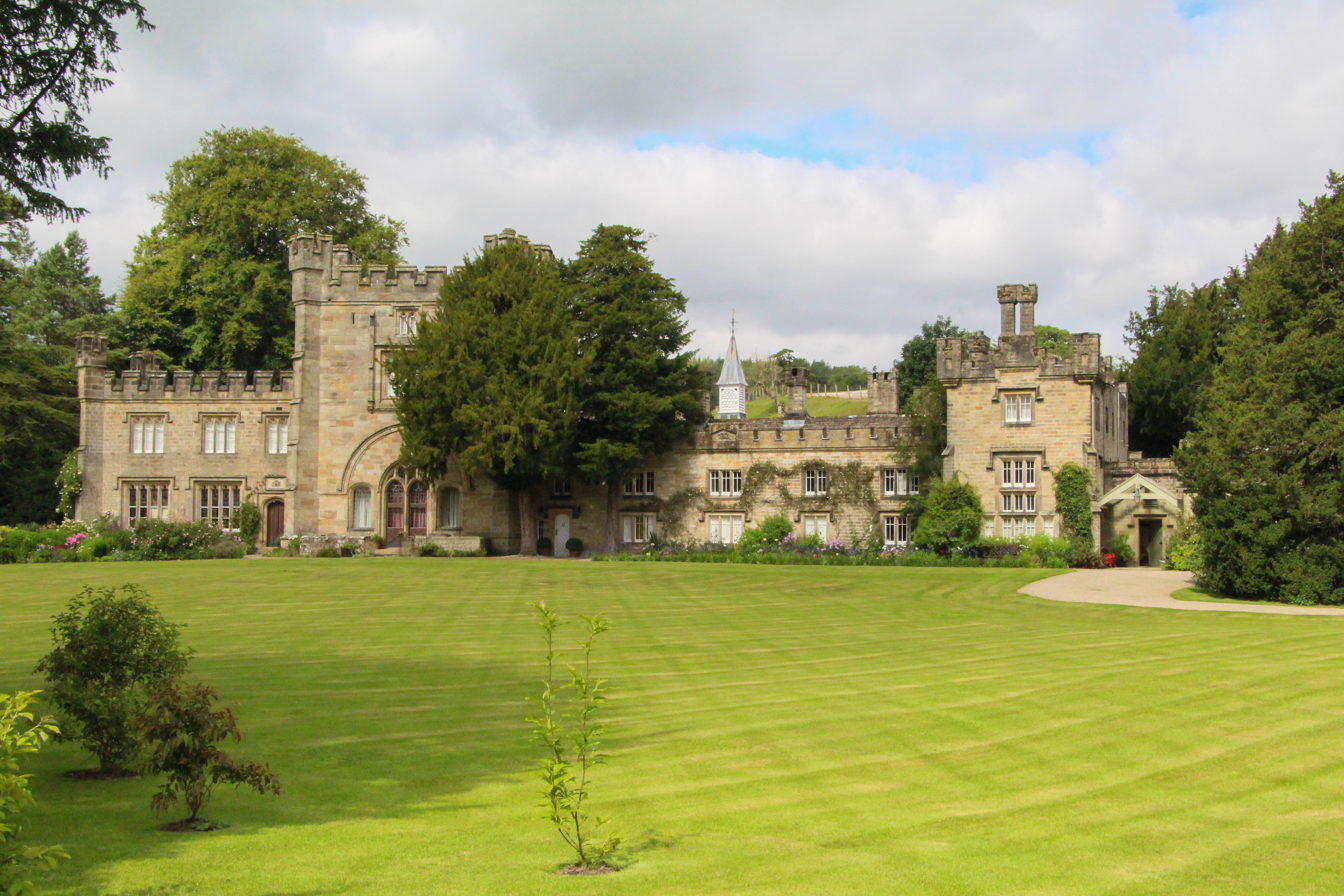
The building, in 2020

Bolton Abbey Hall is a historic building in Bolton Abbey, a village in North Yorkshire, in England.

The building was originally the gatehouse of Bolton Priory. It was built in the 14th century, and was converted into a hunting lodge in 1652. It was owned by the Duke of Devonshire from 1748, who typically spent August at the property, where they sometimes entertained royalty. In the 1843 and 1844, it was extended and altered by Joseph Paxton. In 2022, it was made available for private hire, at a cost of around £25,000 for three nights. It was Grade II* listed in 1954.

The building is constructed of stone, with a stone slate roof and embattled parapets. The gatehouse range has three storeys, and a single bay, to the south is a range with two storeys and three bays, to the north is a range of two storeys and four bays, with a three-storey bay at the end. The gateway has diagonal buttresses, and contains a pointed arch infilled with pointed-arched window, above which is a hood mould and mullioned and transomed windows, and it is flanked by embattled turrets. Elsewhere, the windows are mullioned, some with transoms and some with hood moulds, and there are further embattled turrets. Inside, the gatehouse is divided into two by a cross-wall, with only a small connecting passage. There is a spiral staircase, and a tunnel vaulted roof. There is a large 16th century fireplace in the former west entrance, while the east entrance has a doorway from about 1370, which may have been relocated from the priory's chapter house.

== See also ==
- Grade II* listed buildings in North Yorkshire (district)
- Listed buildings in Bolton Abbey
