= Old Rectory, Bolton Abbey =

Historic building in North Yorkshire, England

Coordinates: 53.9833°N 1.8889°W

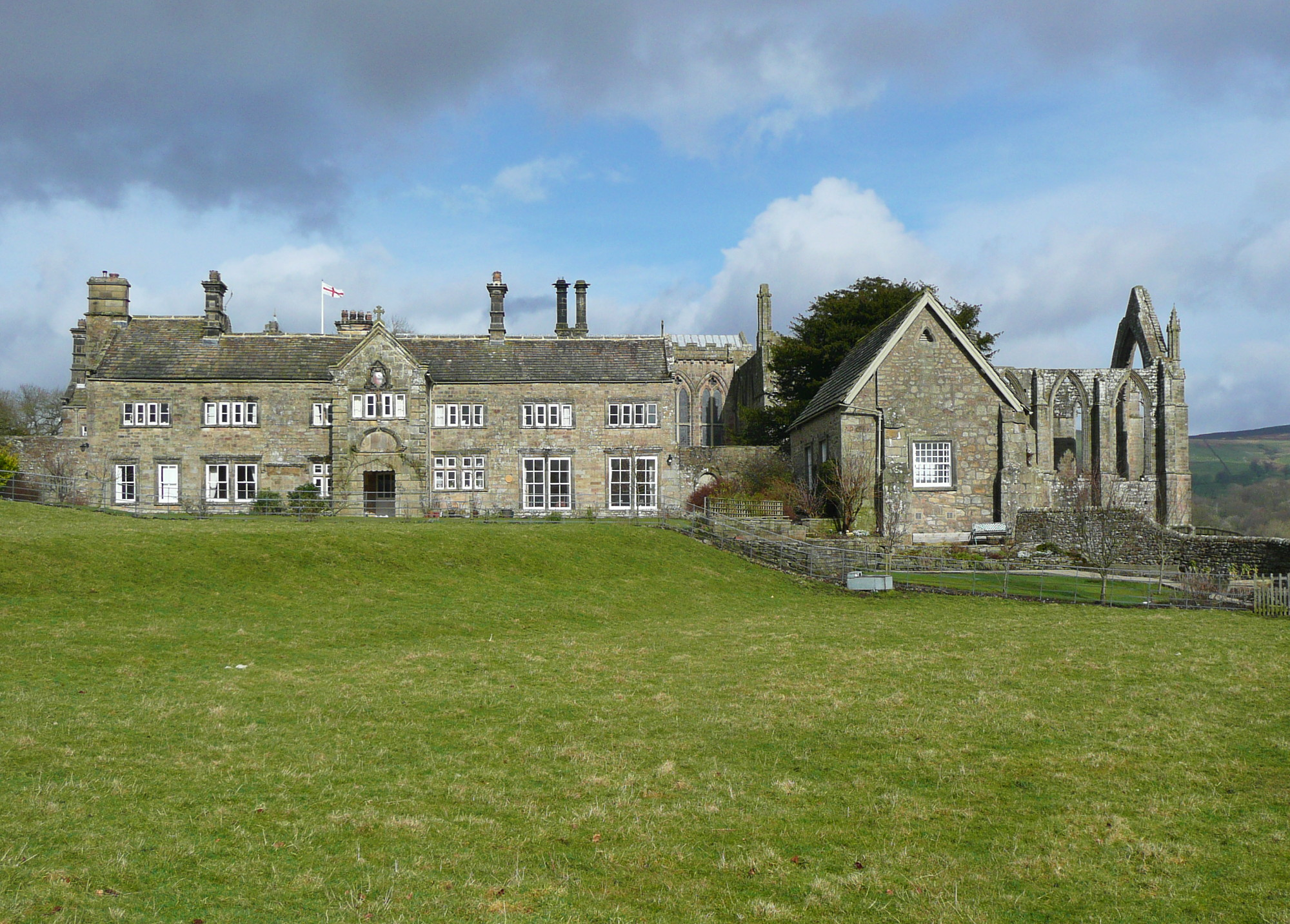
The building, in 2015

The Old Rectory is a historic building in Bolton Abbey, a village in North Yorkshire, England.

The building was originally constructed in the 15th century, as the infirmary of Bolton Priory. In 1700, it was rebuilt as the Boyle School, a boy's grammar school endowed by Robert Boyle. The building later became a rectory, and then in the late 20th century became a private house. It has been Grade II* listed since 1954.

The house is built of stone, with quoins, and a stone slate roof with stone copings and shaped kneelers. It has two storeys and seven bays, with a single-storey two-bay block at right angles connected by a wall. In the centre is a full-height gabled porch containing a doorway with a rusticated surround and voussoirs, and a semicircular hood mould, above which is a four-light window and a carved tablet with a triangular hood mould. In the ground floor are cross windows with sashes, and the upper floor contains double-chamfered mullioned windows. At the rear is a six-light window with a round head and cusped lights. In the rear block is a doorway with a four-centred arched lintel.

== See also ==
- Grade II* listed buildings in North Yorkshire (district)
- Listed buildings in Bolton Abbey
