= Listed buildings in Bolton Abbey =

Bolton Abbey is a civil parish in the county of North Yorkshire, England. It contains 21 listed buildings that are recorded in the National Heritage List for England. Of these, two are listed at Grade I, the highest of the three grades, three are at Grade II*, the middle grade, and the others are at Grade II, the lowest grade. The parish contains the villages of Bolton Abbey and Bolton Bridge and the surrounding area. The most important building in the parish is Bolton Priory, part of which is in ruins, and the other part is the nave of the priory church, which has been converted into a parish church; both are listed at Grade I. Many of the other listed buildings are associated with the priory, including its former gatehouse, which has been converted into a house. The remainder of the listed buildings include houses and cottages, a farmhouse, barns, a former mill and an associated aqueduct, a bridge, a milestone and a memorial fountain.

== Key ==
Grade	Criteria
I	Buildings of exceptional interest, sometimes considered to be internationally important
II*	Particularly important buildings of more than special interest
II	Buildings of national importance and special interest

== Buildings ==
Name and location	Photograph	Date	Description	Grade
Bolton Priory; 53.98380°N 1.88793°W		12th century	An Augustinian priory that was dissolved in 1539. The nave of its church has survived and been converted into St Mary's Church, and the rest of it is a roofless ruin, including the former chancel, the north and south transepts, and the remains of an east chapel. The other monastic buildings survive only as foundations.	I
St Mary's Church; 53.98382°N 1.88852°W		Late 12th century	Originally the nave of the former Bolton Abbey, it was restored between 1875 and 1880 by G.E. Street. It is in stone with a lead roof, and consists of a nave with a clerestory, a north aisle, and an uncompleted west tower. The west front of the tower has angle buttresses with gablets, a decorated plinth, a doorway with a pointed arch and a moulded surround, a flat hood mould, and shields set in quatrefoils in the spandrels. Above the doorway is a frieze, and both are flanked by bind arcading. Above them is a five-light Perpendicular window with a crocketed ogee-headed hood mould. Along the south side of the nave is an embattled parapet.	I
Bolton Abbey Hall; 53.98397°N 1.89018°W		14th century	Originally the gatehouse of Bolton Abbey, it has been converted into a house, and it was further extended in 1843–44 by Joseph Paxton. It is in stone with a stone slate roof and embattled parapets. The gatehouse range has three storeys, and a single bay, to the south is a range with two storeys and three bays, to the north is a range of two storeys and four bays, with a three-storey bay at the end. The gateway has diagonal buttresses, and contains a pointed arch infilled with pointed-arched window, above which is a hood mould and mullioned and transomed windows, and it is flanked by embattled turrets. Elsewhere, the windows are mullioned, some with transoms and some with hood moulds, and there are further embattled turrets.	II*
Precinct wall to the Priory; 53.98335°N 1.89087°W	—	Medieval	The wall extends along the west side of the priory grounds. It is in stone, and about 4 metres (13 ft) high. There is a chamfered band below high triangular-sectioned coping.	II
Fireplace and Chimney south of The Old Rectory; 53.98300°N 1.88932°W		15th century	A remaining stone fragment of the abbey guest house, standing in an isolated position. The chimney is offset up to a small square stack with a cornice.	II
Abbey Mill; 53.98286°N 1.89114°W		16th century	The former mill is in stone with a stone slate roof. There are two storeys and four bays, and a single-storey outshut on the right. The building contains doors, one with a fanlight, another with a quoined surround, garage doors, and mullioned windows.	II
Ferry House; 53.97205°N 1.89211°W		16th century	The house is in stone, and has a stone slate roof with moulded coping and shaped kneelers, There are two storeys and two bays, and an earlier single-storey bay to the left. The main part has a central doorway with a chamfered surround, and the windows have three lights with chamfered mullions. The side bay has a doorway with a chamfered surround and a lintel with a four-centred arch and a square head.	II
The Great Tythe Barn; 53.98057°N 1.89086°W		16th century (probable)	The former tithe barn to Bolton Priory, it is in stone with a stone slate roof. There is a single storey and ten bays. On the front are two double doors with segmental arches in half-dormers, and there are other later openings. The interior is aisled, with nine king-post frames.	II*
The Tea House; 53.98155°N 1.89102°W		16th century (probable)	The stump of an aisled barn converted into a cottage, it is in stone and has a stone slate roof, gableted on the left. On the right return is a gabled porch, there is a single-light window on the front, and two two-light gabled dormers.	II
Riddings Cottage; 53.99678°N 1.89414°W	—	17th century (probable)	The cottage is in stone, with quoins, and a stone slate roof with stone coping and shaped kneelers, There are two storeys and two bays, the left bay with a circular plan and the right bay rectangular. The left bay contains a doorway with a plain surround and a two-light mullioned window, and to the right is a blocked doorway, above which is a blocked window, both with chamfered surrounds. The right bay contains sash windows, and at the rear is a pointed-arched opening with a moulded and chamfered surround. Inside the cottage is a large inglenook fireplace.	II
The Devonshire Arms; 53.97435°N 1.89450°W		17th century	A house that was later extended and converted into a hotel, it is in stone, partly rendered, with a stone slate roof. The central block is the oldest, and has two storeys and attics, and four bays. To the left is a block with two storeys and six bays, and beyond it is a stable block with two storeys and three bays. To the right is a seven-bay block, and recessed at right angles is a two-storey four-bay block. The windows in the main block are mullioned, the left block has casement windows, in the stable block are Diocletian windows, and in the right block the windows are sashes.	II
The Old Rectory; 53.98329°N 1.88887°W		1700	The house, which incorporates earlier material, is in stone, with quoins, and a stone slate roof with stone copings and shaped kneelers. There are two storeys and seven bays, and a single-storey two-bay block at right angles connected by a wall. In the centre is a full-height gabled porch containing a doorway with a rusticated surround and voussoirs, and a semicircular hood mould, above which is a four-light window and a carved tablet with a triangular hood mould. In the ground floor are cross windows with sashes, and the upper floor contains double-chamfered mullioned windows. At the rear is a six-light window with a round head and cusped lights. In the rear block is a doorway with a four-centred arched lintel.	II*
Duke's Barn; 53.98391°N 1.89267°W	—	17th or early 18th century	A threshing barn and cow house in stone on a plinth, with quoins, and a corrugated roof over heather thatch. It contains doorways, a stable door, windows, vents and a pitching door. Inside there are two cruck frames, probably brought from elsewhere.	II
1, 2, 3 and 4 The Green; 53.98131°N 1.89141°W		18th century	A row of four cottages in stone with a stone slate roof. There are two storeys and eight bays, the five right-hand bays dating from the 19th century. The windows are a mix, consisting of casements, horizontally-sliding sashes and mullioned windows.	II
Aqueduct north of the Abbey Mill; 53.98283°N 1.89132°W		18th century	The aqueduct, which crosses the B6160 road, is in stone. It consists of three rusticated elliptical-headed arches, the central one larger and spanning the road, about 3 metres (9.8 ft) high.	II
Devonshire Cottages; 53.97345°N 1.89485°W		Mid 18th century	A pair of stone cottages with quoins and a stone slate roof. There are two storeys and four bays. On the front are two doorways, and the windows are mullioned and contain sashes.	II
Bolton Bridge; 53.97198°N 1.89167°W		1776	The bridge carries a road over the River Wharfe. It is in stone and consists of two segmental arches with voussoirs and a hood moulds. The bridge has a triangular cutwater, pilasters, a band and parapets.	II
The Arches; 53.98257°N 1.89195°W		Late 18th to early 19th century	A stone house with quoins, and a stone slate roof, with stone coping and shaped kneelers. There are two storeys and three bays. In the centre is a doorway, the windows are sashes, and all are in plain architraves. Between the storeys is some carved stonework moved from Bolton Priory.	II
Stank House Farmhouse; 53.98603°N 1.89854°W	—	Early 19th century	The farmhouse is in stone on a plinth, with a hipped slate roof. There are two storeys and three bays. In the centre is a doorway and the windows are sashes, all with plain surrounds. In the left return is a window with an inscribed lintel.	II
Milestone; 53.97479°N 1.89469°W		Mid 19th century	The milestone consists of a triangular stone pillar. The left face is inscribed "SKIPTON", and on the right face is "BOLTON ABBEY".	II
Cavendish Memorial; 53.98634°N 1.88708°W		1886	The memorial fountain is in stone and has a hexagonal plan. Steps lead up to a plinth, at each corner is a buttress rising above the parapet, and below the eaves is an inscribed frieze, with a gargoyle on each buttress. Within the memorial is a fountain. Above the frieze is an embattled parapet with arcading, and a coat of arms on each side. At the top is an ogee lantern with a crocketed finial above open gableted arches.	II
