= Listed buildings in Draughton, North Yorkshire =

Draughton is a civil parish in the county of North Yorkshire, England. It contains eleven listed buildings that are recorded in the National Heritage List for England. All the listed buildings are designated at Grade II, the lowest of the three grades, which is applied to "buildings of national importance and special interest". The parish contains the village of Draughton and the surrounding countryside. The listed buildings consist of houses, cottages and a farmhouse, a bridge, a limekiln, a guidepost, two boundary stones and two milestones.

== Buildings ==
Name and location	Photograph	Date	Notes
Manor House and Cottage; 53.96884°N 1.94236°W	—	1659	The house and cottage are in limestone with sandstone dressings and a stone slate roof. There are two storeys and an L-shaped plan, with a front range of five bays. The doorway has a chamfered surround, a pointed arch and a massive lintel, and above it is an initialled datestone. The windows are casements, most with double-chamfered mullions, and there are round-headed staircase windows.
Holly Cottage; 53.96816°N 1.94268°W	—	17th century	The cottage is in stone, and has a stone slate roof with a shaped kneeler on the left. There are two storeys and two bays. In the centre is a gabled porch with shaped kneelers, and to its right is a blocked doorway with a chamfered surround. The windows are casements, most with mullions.
Guidepost; 53.95594°N 1.94065°W		c. 1740	The guidepost is in millstone grit, it is about 1.2 metres (3 ft 11 in) tall, and has a square section and a segmental-arched head. The stone is inscribed on two sides with the distances to Skipton, Draughton, Addingham and Silsden.
Farfield Farmhouse; 53.96166°N 1.88729°W	—	1775	The farmhouse is in sandstone, with quoins, modillioned eaves, and a stone slate roof with gable copings and shaped kneelers. There are two storeys and three bays. The central doorway has a dated lintel, and the windows are mullioned with sashes.
Flat Bridge; 53.97252°N 1.89402°W		c. 1800	The bridge carries the B6160 road over a stream. It is in stone, and consists of a single segmental arch with voussoirs. The bridge has a raked parapet and later coping.
Howgill House; 53.96864°N 1.94196°W	—	c. 1810	The house is in stone, with square eaves modillions, and a stone slate roof with gable coping. There are two storeys and two bays. On the front is a gabled porch with decorative bargeboards, and the windows are sashes with plain surrounds.
Wheelam Kiln; 53.96705°N 1.95116°W	—	c. 1830	A limekiln in millstone grit about 8 metres (26 ft) wide and 5 metres (16 ft) high. In front of it is a segmental curve, and it contains a pair of stokeholes with segmental arches of rubble voussoirs containing a pair of pits.
Boundary stone in village centre 53.96659°N 1.94207°W		Late 19th century	The boundary stone is in sandstone, and is about 1 metre (3 ft 3 in) high, with a triangular plan. The left side is inscribed "BOLTON-ABBEY", and the right side "ADDINGHAM".
Boundary stone on Skipton Road; 53.96579°N 1.96413°W		Late 19th century	The boundary stone on the north side of Skipton Road (A65 road) is in millstone grit. It is about 60 centimetres (24 in) high, and has a basket-arched top. The stone is divided by a vertical line, on the left side is inscribed "SKIPTON LOCAL BOARD" and on the right side "ESHD DRAUGHTON".
Milestone (west); 53.96735°N 1.94823°W		c. 1890	The milestone consists of a gritstone slab with a cast iron front. It has a triangular section and a rounded top. On the top is inscribed "SKIPTON & OTLEY ROAD" and "DRAUGHTON" and on the sides are the distances to Skipton, Ilkley and Otley.
Milestone (east); 53.96261°N 1.92511°W		c. 1890	The milestone on the northwest side of the A65 road consists of a gritstone slab with a cast iron front. It has a triangular section and a rounded top. On the top is inscribed "SKIPTON & OTLEY ROAD" and "DRAUGHTON" and on the sides are the distances to Skipton, Ilkley and Otley.
