= Bolton Bridge =

Hamlet in the United Kingdom

Coordinates: 53.9744°N 1.8946°W

- Hamlet
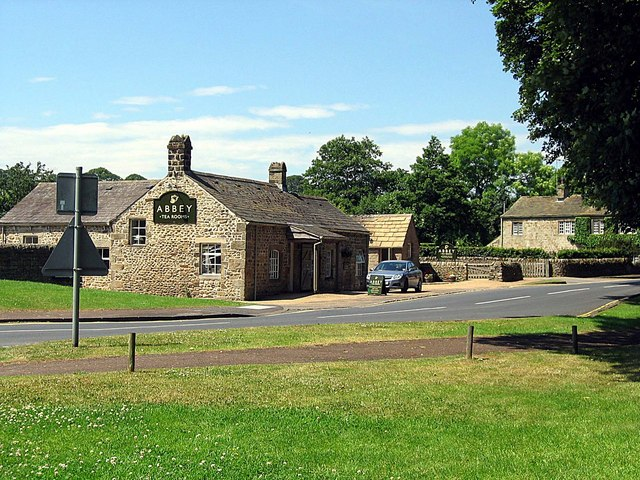
- Buildings in the hamlet

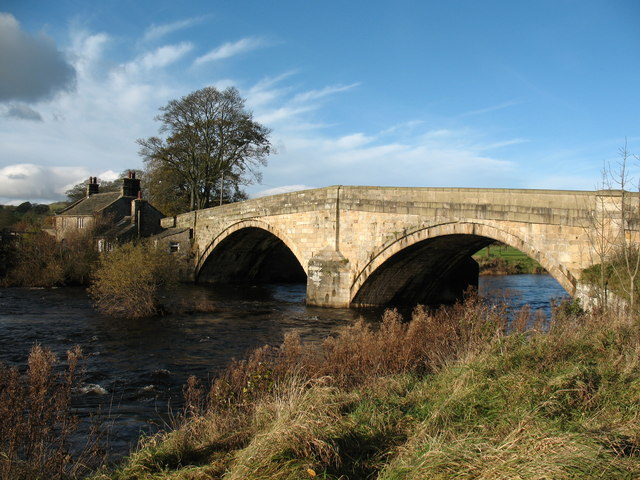
- The bridge itself

- Location within North Yorkshire
- Civil parish: Bolton Abbey
- Unitary authority: North Yorkshire
- Ceremonial county: North Yorkshire
- Region: Yorkshire and the Humber
- Country: England
- Sovereign state: United Kingdom
- Police: North Yorkshire
- Fire: North Yorkshire
- Ambulance: Yorkshire
- UK Parliament: Skipton and Ripon

Bolton Bridge is a hamlet in the civil parish of Bolton Abbey, in North Yorkshire, England, on the west side of the River Wharfe. It is south along the B6160 road from the village of Bolton Abbey. It is in the parish of Bolton Abbey.

The hamlet shares its name with Bolton Bridge, an old bridge over the river less than a kilometre south of the settlement. The bridge is Grade II listed, and was built in 1807. The cottage building standing on the west bank of the river by the bridge may be the site of a former chapel. There are several heritage buildings in the hamlet including some cottages and the Devonshire Arms pub. The hamlet area is considered at-risk for floods.

The hamlet lies on the route of the Dales Way.
