= Bolton Priory =

Coordinates: 53°58′57″N 1°53′14″W

Bolton Priory, Bolton Abbey
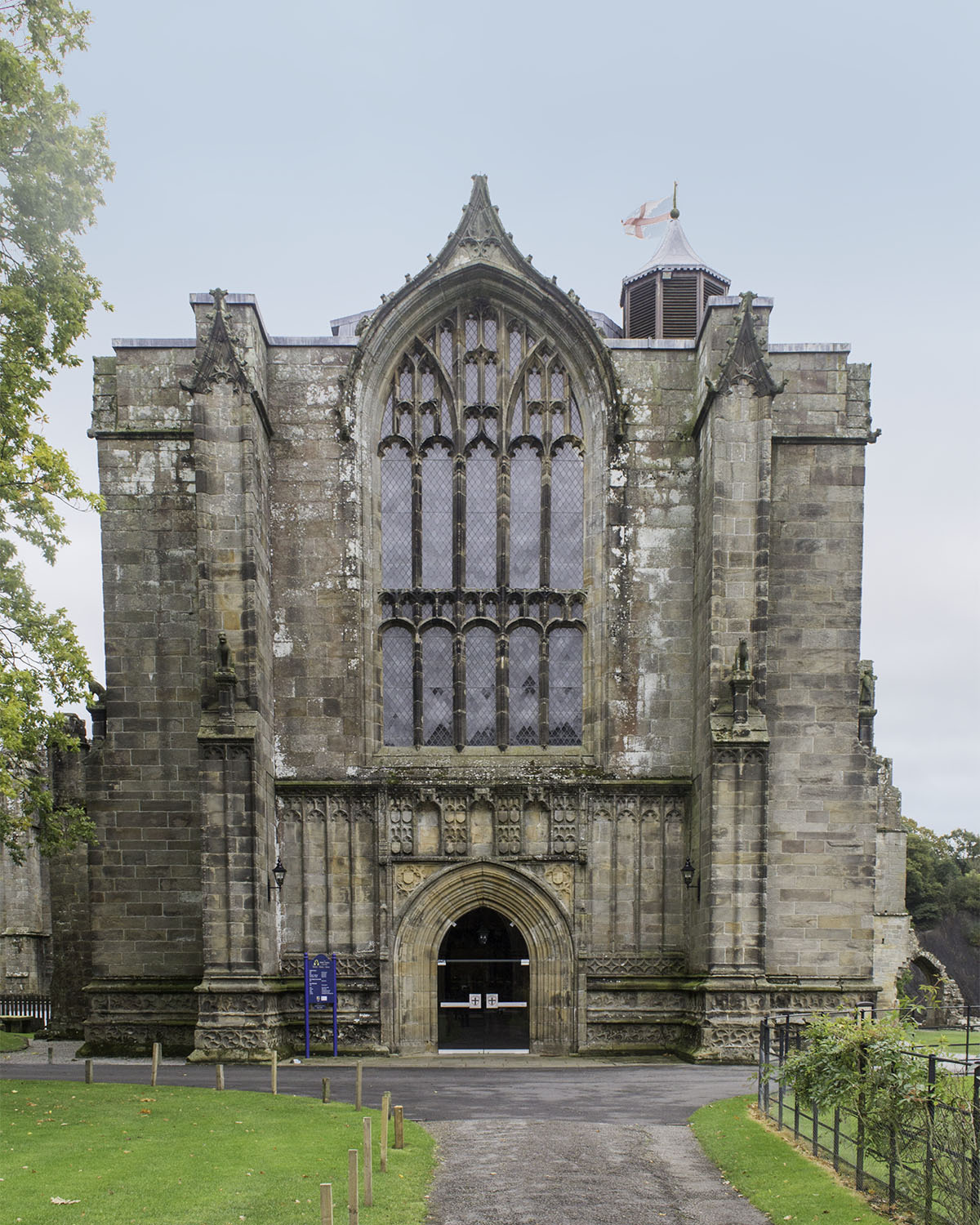
- West Facade of Bolton Priory

- Location within North Yorkshire
- OS grid reference: SE 07398 54203
- Location: Bolton Abbey, North Yorkshire
- Country: England
- Denomination: Church of England
- Churchmanship: Broad Church
- Website: http://www.boltonpriory.org.uk

History
- Dedication: St Mary and St Cuthbert

Architecture
- Heritage designation: Grade I listed building
- Architectural type: Gothic

Administration
- Province: York
- Diocese: Anglican Diocese of Leeds
- Parish: Bolton Abbey

Clergy
- Rector: Reverend Nicholas Mercer

Bolton Priory, whose full title is The Priory Church of St Mary and St Cuthbert, Bolton Abbey, is a Grade I listed parish church of the Church of England in the village of Bolton Abbey, within the Yorkshire Dales National Park in North Yorkshire, England. There has been continuous worship on the site since 1154, when a group of Augustinian canons moved from their original community in nearby village of Embsay and started construction of the present building, which is now situated within a scheduled monument under the Ancient Monuments and Archaeological Areas Act 1979. Despite the loss of most of the Priory buildings during the Dissolution of the Monasteries, the western half of the original nave was preserved so that the local parish could continue its worship there. There is today a full liturgical calendar, together with the Bolton Priory Concert Series and the annual St Cuthbert lecture. The Priory is a member of the Greater Churches Network, and welcomes more than 100,000 visitors a year.

== History ==
=== Foundation ===
The church has its historical origins in an Augustinian priory founded at Embsay, five miles to the west of the village of Bolton (as it was then known), in 1120. The community moved to Bolton in 1154 and started the construction of the present building. The east end of the church was an oblong building, parts of which are still seen in the walls of the original chancel, that may have been built over a former Saxon chapel. Round this structure a short chancel, tower and transepts were built, and a conventional cloister was added to the south west of the south transept.

The full nave was completed in the middle of the 13th century. The north wall of the existing cloister was used as the basis of the south wall and the church was completed by the addition of a west front (still standing) which was joined to the north transept by a north aisle. The exterior of the south wall of the church has corbels that supported the cloister roof, a line of stone seats demarcated by pillars and arcades, and a holy water stoup by the south-east door.

=== 14th century additions ===
The canons made significant enhancements in the 14th century. The chancel was extended to the east; the choir, which was originally housed in the crossing, moved into the west end of the chancel and the rood screen, originally at the foot of the present chancel steps, was moved into the western arch of the tower. A north aisle was constructed and the two doors at the west end of the north aisle and the aisle windows were elaborately decorated. The height of the chancel was increased and decorated windows were added to the chancel and the aisle.

The framework of the chancel windows is still visible, although much of the tracery in the chancel has been destroyed. The transepts were largely rebuilt, again with the addition of decorated glass, although only two small fragments of the originals remain. A new octagonal chapter house was built to the east, the east range was altered and extended to the south and the Prior moved his accommodation from the north of the west range to the south end of the east range.

These buildings have been virtually destroyed, and only the bases of their walls and of the pillars that supported the first floors remain. It is however possible to see the carved bases of the seats in the chapter house, a sealed window at the top of the night stair, the remains of the day stair and fragments of the outer parlour.

=== Incomplete tower ===
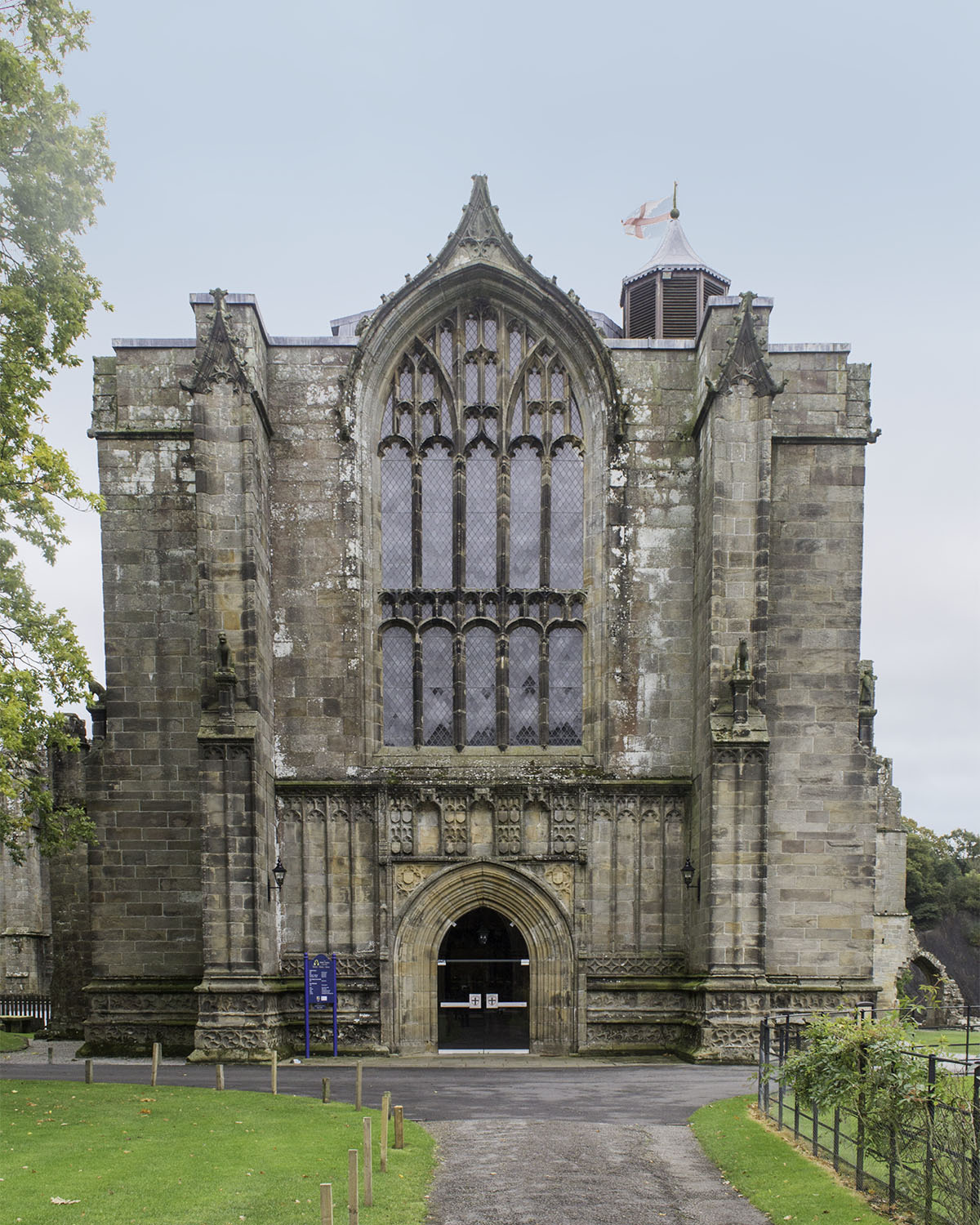
West tower of present-day Priory

In 1520 Prior Moone, who was to be the last Prior, set about building the West Tower. Intended to be three times the height of the section that remains, it was erected on its own foundations with the intention that, when it had settled, the west wall would be demolished and the great east arch of the tower would become the entrance to the nave. Progress was slow – possibly because the roof of the nave was found to be defective and work had to halt while it was repaired. (The nave roof is thought to date from this time). Only a third of the tower had been built when work was halted by the Dissolution.

The tower was therefore left without a roof and without glass in its windows and with gaps between the tower and the west front in which the (unused) tie-stones are still visible. Of the tower itself Professor Hamilton Thompson says ‘it is one of the noblest designs of its age and, had it been completed, it would have had few parallels in England’.

Over the doorway of the West Tower there is an original inscription bearing the Prior's symbol (a moon) and stating that he ‘began this foundacyon in MCVXX’. It is flanked by models of hounds, which may be an allusion to the Prior's duties as Master Forester or a play on the name of the husband of the Foundress, William Meschin (mes chien).

A third dog on the north side, which has an open mouth, is linked in local folklore with the rhyme 'Hey Diddle Diddle' and the little dog that laughed, although Professor Thompson merely describes it as the figure of an animal. On the south side there is an effigy of a pilgrim – probably the patron William de Forz – who may have paid for the nave and died on pilgrimage in 1241 a year after it was completed. The side pillars of the door once bore the Priory Cross (the emblem of the Albermarles, the founders) and of the next generation of Patrons, the Cliffords.

=== Dissolution ===
The Priory was dissolved in 1539. Because the Priory was an Augustinian foundation, with the canons therefore supplying priests to local churches rather than being enclosed monks, it was in effect the local church for the surrounding community. Therefore, the western half of nave was spared and was sealed from the eastern half, soon to fall into ruin, by a crude stone wall.

The Priory's ‘jewels’ (mostly silver) went to the King, the lead from the roof and the three bells went to Thomas Cromwell, the Priory's churches went to Christ Church, Oxford, the gatehouse eventually became Bolton Abbey Hall and the extensive estate was broken up – the largest part being bought by Henry Clifford, 1st Earl of Cumberland. Many of the remaining buildings in the Priory, their protective lead roof having been removed, gradually collapsed or were demolished, the stone being reused within many buildings in the surrounding area. Prior Moone and the canons were pensioned off.

For the next 200 years the church was administered by Holy Trinity Church, Skipton and was under the care of a curate. Virtually nothing is known about this period, although there is the occasional historical reference to broken and boarded windows.

The restoration of the church was started by Richard Boyle, 3rd Earl of Burlington who, in 1728, provided new flagstones and new doors, whitewashed the interior and repaired the windows. In 1796 William Cavendish, 5th Duke of Devonshire and the incumbent, the Rev. William Carr, re-arranged the layout of the nave, to reflect an emphasis at that time on the Gospel and preaching, rather than on the Eucharist.

The pews, which until then had faced the altar to the east, were instead set on three sides of a square facing a three-decker pulpit on the south wall, with a wooden screen to the east blocking off the altar.

=== 19th century restoration ===
In the mid nineteenth century, facing the rise of Nonconformity and the Catholic Emancipation, many within the Church of England were advocating a return to the ‘medieval’ church. In 1854 William Cavendish, 6th Duke of Devonshire commissioned a stained-glass design from Augustus Pugin, of Houses of Parliament fame, to replace the plain glass in the six windows on the south wall. Then, in 1866, two years after Bolton Abbey became its own parish with its own Rector, William Cavendish, 7th Duke of Devonshire began a major restoration, supervised by George Street.

The orientation and design of the church once again faced the altar, to emphasise the centrality of the Eucharist. To preserve ancient structures on the north and south walls, the raised altar and chancel were enclosed within a low wall, following the design of the Basilica of San Clemente al Laterano in Rome, with lectern and pulpit to north and south. The gates were designed by George Pace, who also made a pyx installed in the north aisle.

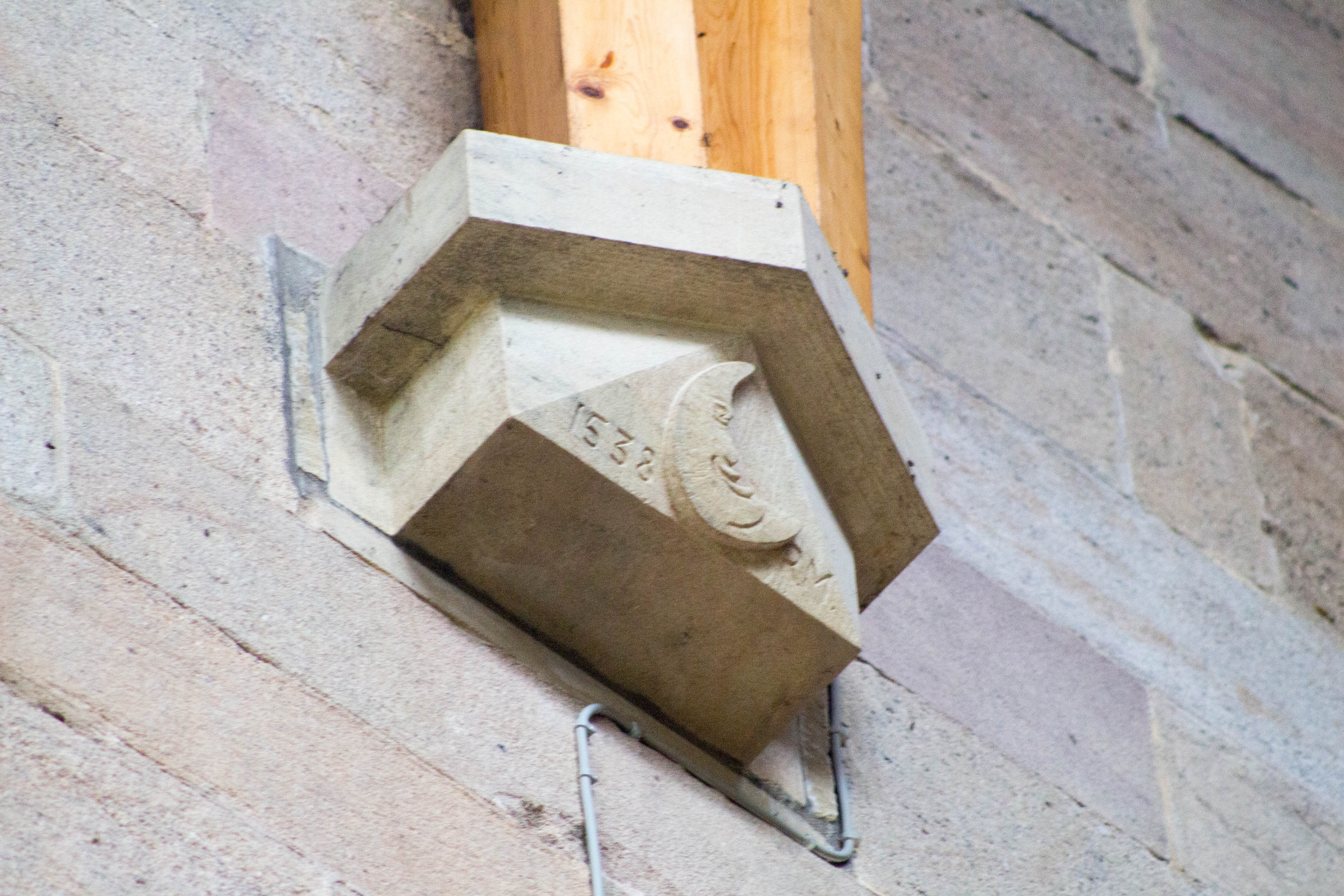
Prior Moone symbol

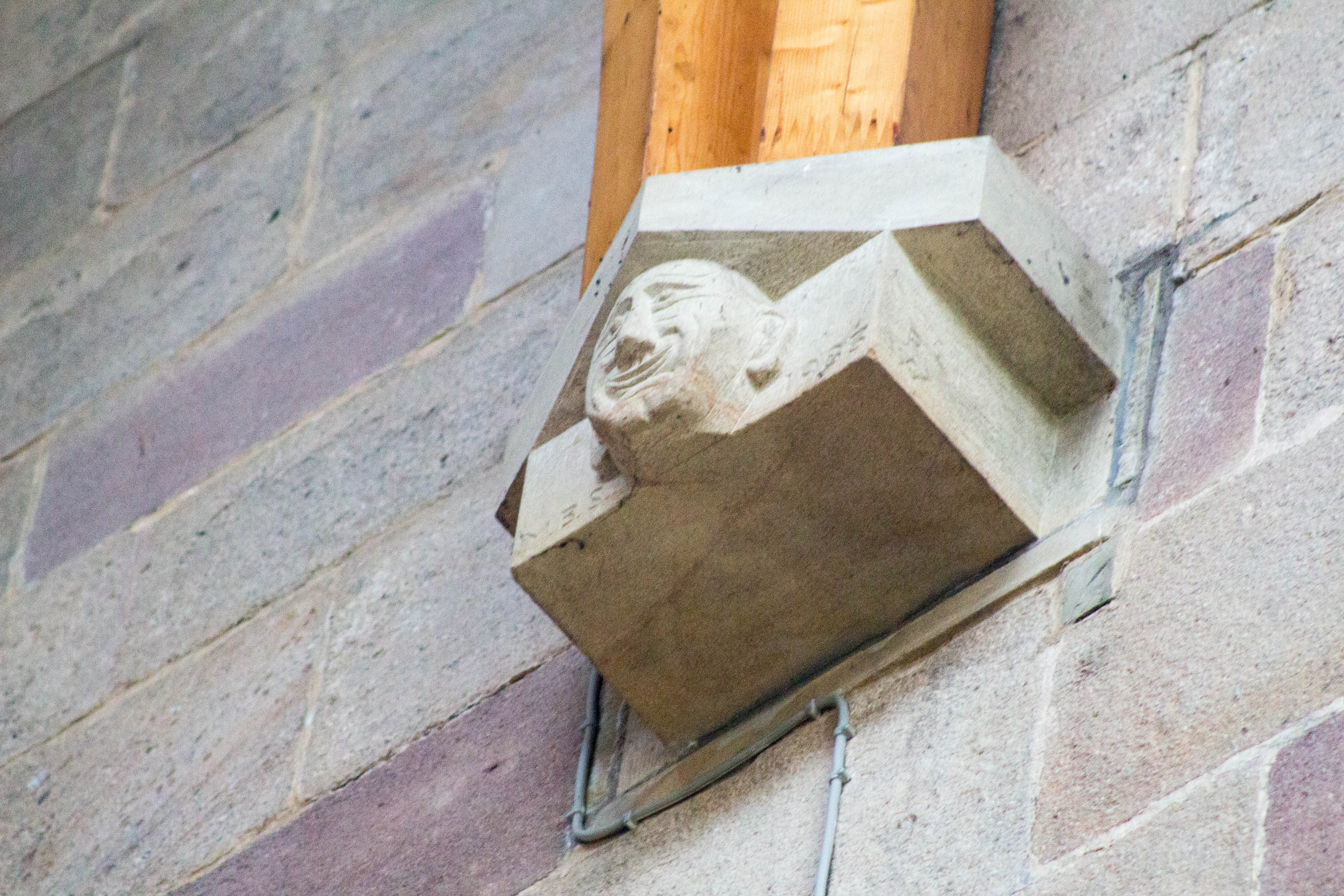
Canon Slaughter effigy

The crude wall that had been erected in the western arch of the tower at the time of the Dissolution was removed and replaced a new wall emphasising the moulding of the arch. The new wall was decorated with paintings of plants and emblems of religious significance by a local artist, George Bottomley. The plaster and whitewash was removed from the walls, the chancel was tiled, the floor of the nave was renewed, the screen was moved to the back of the church, east-facing oak pews and a new font were installed and the doors were replaced. A new three-manual organ was commissioned.

=== 20th century ===
Worship continued for the next hundred years, but by the latter part of the 20th century the size of the congregation in this sparsely populated rural parish had dwindled to single figures; the church was dilapidated, there was no Rector, and the Diocese considered the option of abandoning it. Its fortunes were revived by the energy and enthusiasm of Canon Maurice Slaughter, who resigned his previous appointment to become Priest-in Charge. He stimulated interest in the Priory among the wider population of North and West Yorkshire, and oversaw a major fund-raising effort during the 1980s that financed a comprehensive overhaul of the building.

The organ was fitted with a detached console, a previously overlooked stone altar was reinstated, the font was moved to the east end and the choir vestry to the west end of the North Aisle. The bell turret was replaced, the original bell (dated 1695) was re-hung, the windows in the west tower were glazed for the first time (using grooves prepared over 400 years earlier) and the tower was finally, after 450 years, roofed over. The roof is supported on corbels bearing on one side the moon symbol of Prior Moone, who started the tower, and on the other the effigy of Canon Slaughter who preserved and completed it. Canon Slaughter's ashes were recently buried under a memorial stone by the north wall.

When, in 1950, the village of Bolton Abbey was connected to the National Grid, electric lights – mainly suspended from brackets on the side walls – were fitted. These were replaced in 2016 with LED lights fitted unobtrusively behind the roof beams, at the top of the pillars of the arcade, at the base of the windows and below the corbels supporting the roof of the tower. This ambitious scheme circumvented the difficult and dangerous task of replacing bulbs that had ‘blown’, illuminated architectural features that had hitherto been invisible and enabled the lighting to be remotely controlled to meet the varying needs of the services, concerts and lectures that take place in the Priory.

=== 21st century ===
The 21st century saw a number of formidable challenges. Since well before the beginning of the century the church as a whole was having to face the problem of global climate change. In 2019, after much research, Bolton Priory embraced the challenge by moving away from fossil fuel (Liquid Petroleum Gas LPG) and installing under-pew electric heating from a renewable energy source. Between 2019 and 2025, the Priory made considerable strides forward in reducing its carbon footprint and became the 67th Church in England and Wales to become a Gold Eco Church for the high standards achieved. Another formidable challenge was the global pandemic COVID-19. The pandemic struck at the end of 2019 and Bolton Priory closed its doors in March 2020. The Church remained closed for much of the next two years although the Tower remained open for prayer and the lighting of votive candles. During the COVID-19 pandemic the church produced audio on-line services so that the parish could continue its worship on-line and, following the end of the pandemic, WI-FI was introduced allowing services to be streamed across the world. Worshippers have come from as far afield as South Africa, Singapore, Switzerland and South America. The gradual decline in the use of cash, particularly among young people, saw the introduction of digital collection plates and donation portals. Finally, the meteoric rise in the use of Artificial Intelligence (AI) was also evidenced at Bolton Priory by the first AI generated sermon being delivered on 12 January 2025 (Baptism of Christ).

=== Notable individuals ===
The patrons of the Priory have always been closely associated with national affairs. The first dynasty, the Albemarles, from 1120 to 1293, included five women whose wealth was usually increased by a succession of arranged and often unhappy marriages. The first, Cecily, was the daughter of Robert de Rumilly, who had been granted the lands of Earl Edwin after the Norman Conquest. The fourth, Hawise, and her second husband William de Forz were supposedly the parents of the pilgrim represented by the statue outside the West Tower. In fact, that child was probably the son of John, King of England, who became Hawise's guardian after the death of her first husband. The Crown recovered the estate by devious means from the seventh and last member of the line, Isabella de Revieres.

In 1310 the estate was granted by the Crown to Edward I’s adviser, Robert de Clifford. The Cliffords, who held the title for 229 years, lived through the wars with France and Scotland and the Wars of the Roses. Of a succession of male heirs, six were killed, one was hanged and one exiled. Only two lived beyond the age of 41 and died in bed. Thomas the eighth Lord was killed at the Battle of St Albans and John, the ninth, earned the pseudonym of ‘Butcher Cumberland’ when he murdered the young Duke of Rutland after the Battle of Wakefield. As a result, the tenth (‘Shepherd’) Lord was hidden by shepherds for 25 years, during which time he developed an interest in astronomy and astrology. He made the interesting (and accurate) prediction that his grandsons would become involved in major litigation. His inheritance was finally restored by Henry VII.

Some of Margaret de Neville's charitable giving was recorded in the Coucher Book of Bolton Abbey, there instead of describing herself as 'wife of ...' or 'daughter of ...' Margaret de Neville used her own names, both "domina Margareta de Longvl" and "domina Margareta de Nevill". De Neville died in 1318 or 1319 and was possibly buried at Bolton Abbey. The prior of Bolton Priory was an executor of her will.

In 1492 the eleventh Lord Clifford became the first Earl of Cumberland, who held the estate for 134 years. At one stage Margaret, the daughter of the second Earl, was of great interest to those plotting to maintain a Protestant succession after the death of Edward VI, for as the Catholic counterpart of Lady Jane Grey she was obviously a potential danger. George, the third Earl had a colourful life, fighting against the Spanish Armada and acting as Queen's Champion. But he was an unlucky privateer, an unfaithful husband and an unsuccessful manager of his estate. During his protracted absences Margaret, his wife, having found books and equipment left by the ‘Shepherd Lord’, studied alchemy under the supervision of Elizabeth's Magician, John Dee, who was a family friend.

The third Earl is best remembered because, contrary to the law, he passed the estate to his brother and not to his daughter, Lady Anne Clifford. This precipitated the protracted litigation predicted by the ‘Shepherd Lord’. Anne, who became Countess of Pembroke, eventually prevailed by outliving her competitors and recovered much of her inheritance. The Bolton estate, however, passed to the daughter of the 5th Earl and thence, by marriage, to the Burlingtons.

The Burlingtons inherited the estate in 1643 and held it for 77 years, during which time the main event was the foundation of a grammar school ‘for the sons of gentlemen’. Now the Old Rectory, it was paid for with a bequest from the physicist Robert Boyle, brother of the first Earl, and built with stones from the ruined Priory. It was of questionable value, for there was already a good grammar school in the district, but it provided an extra income for the rector who was ex officio headmaster.

On the death of the 3rd Earl in 1753 the estate again passed by marriage to the present holders, the Dukes of Devonshire. William, the fifth Duke, married the famous Georgiana and later married his mistress, Lady Elizabeth Foster. William, the sixth (‘Bachelor’) Duke, Georgiana's child, installed the Pugin windows and William, the seventh Duke, whose many bequests include the Cavendish Laboratories in Cambridge, was the driving force behind the major refurbishment the Priory. Spencer, the eighth Duke, was the brother of Frederick Charles, assassinated in Phoenix Park, Dublin, who is commemorated by a cross in the churchyard and a memorial fountain at the entrance to the Cavendish Pavilion. Against the will of both sets of parents William, Marquis of Hartington, and heir apparent to the 10th Duke, married Kathleen (‘Kick’) Kennedy, the Roman Catholic sister of the subsequent American President. Shortly after, William was killed in action during the Second World War. His widow then formed an association with Peter, 8th Earl Fitzwilliam of Wentworth Woodhouse, who was not only Protestant but was already married. Both were killed when a small aircraft in which they were flying crashed, and the Devonshires made the funeral arrangements on behalf of the estranged family.

Among the incumbents is William Carr (Minister 1789–1843) was the fourth member of his family to hold the position in three generations. He was also Headmaster of the Boyle School, Receiver for the Ducal Estates in the East and West Ridings, the second largest agricultural tenant on the estate and bred the famous (312 stone) Craven Heifer – which resided in a stall with an enlarged doorway in the Arches Farm opposite the Priory. His grave, marked with the chalice and paten of a priest, is in the Priory crossing.

A significant person who, at his own request, left a thriving church in Skipton to become Priest in Charge of the virtually deserted priory, was Canon Maurice Slaughter, a lifelong evangelist who started his ministry in the Church Army Fenland Caravan. His reputation as a preacher and pastor who attracted large congregations was confirmed when he revived and reconstructed the large, dilapidated and isolated Priory Church, finally adding the roof to the incomplete tower.

== Location ==
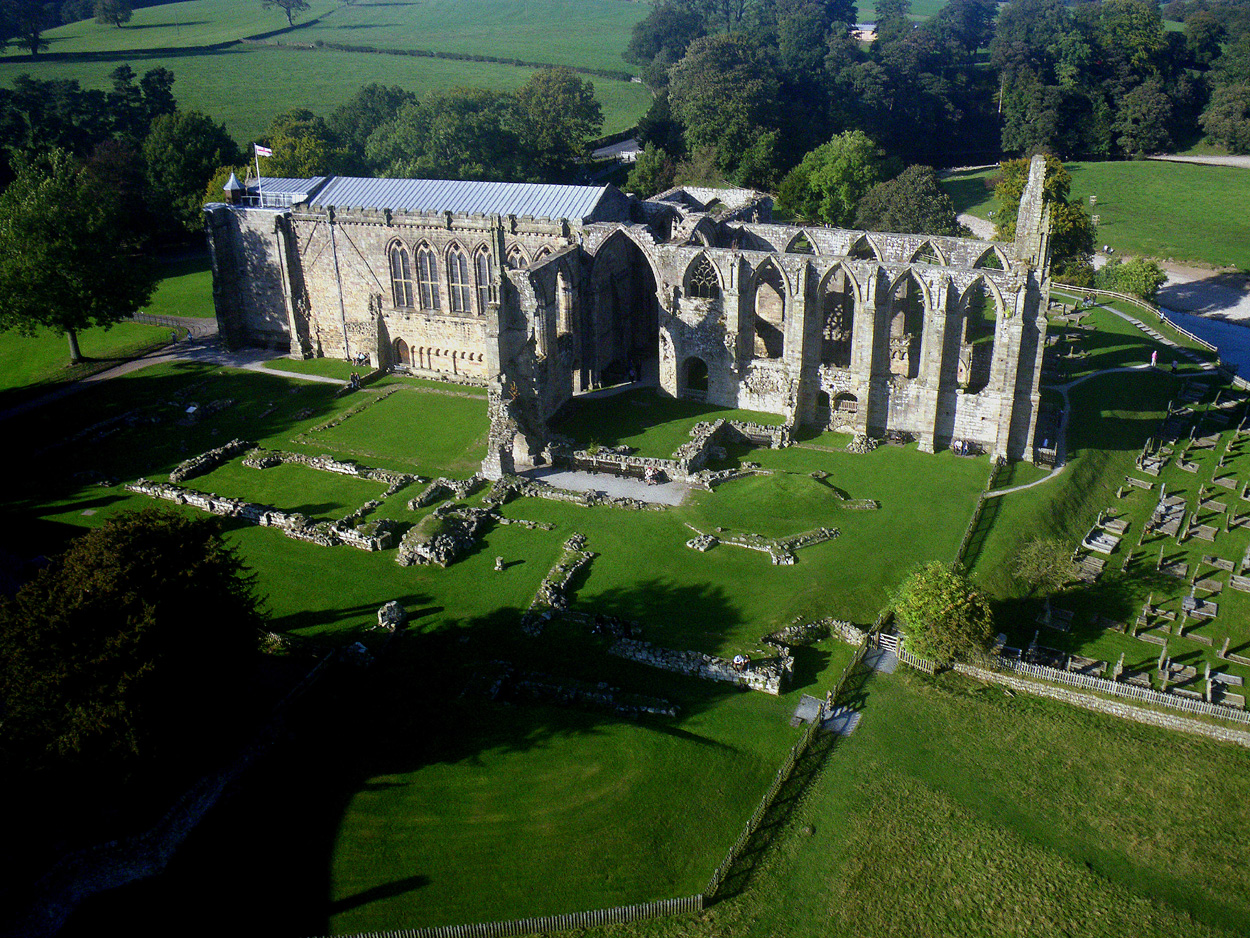
Bolton Priory and ruins from the south

The priory church, which was formed from the nave and west tower of the original Augustinian priory, is set on an east-facing slope above a curve in the River Wharfe, close to the village of Bolton Abbey. It is attached to the old chancel, crossing and transept which are moderately well preserved, and adjacent to the chapter house and cloister, of which only the foundations remain. The site is bounded to the west by the wall of the old Priory and on the other sides by a fence. There are road entries from the road to north and south and pedestrian entries from the east (river-side) boundary.

To the west of the church the 14th-century gatehouse, which lies just within the perimeter wall, has been converted into a Hall and was extended by Joseph Paxton. Behind it is an aqueduct, built in the latter part of the 18th century, which crossed the road to supply the mills on the estate. To the south the Boyle School (founded in 1700 and paid for by a bequest of physicist Robert Boyle, and now the rectory) stands on a site once occupied by the kitchens, guest house and infirmary. The chimney of the guest house remains, and there are some 15th-century windows. It may be that a small hall called the Boyle Room was once part of the infirmary, but despite extensive research by Professor Hamilton Thompson in his definitive 1920s' study of the Priory, the original layout of this area is unclear. Near the southern border of the precincts are hollows, said to have been fish-ponds. Beyond them there is a tithe barn which is on the site of a medieval barn but has been much renewed and contains no medieval work. A second similar barn was demolished in 1775, and the village ‘Tea Cottage’ appears to have been part of a third.

== Interior ==
There are two crypts in the church. One, under the vestry in the north-west corner, is still intact. The second, now under the organ, contained the coffins of the Clapham family which were stored in a vertical position. It was subsequently filled with bones found in the 1866 restoration and sealed. The seat of the Clapham family was nearby Beamsley Hall, where some 10 generations of the family lived.

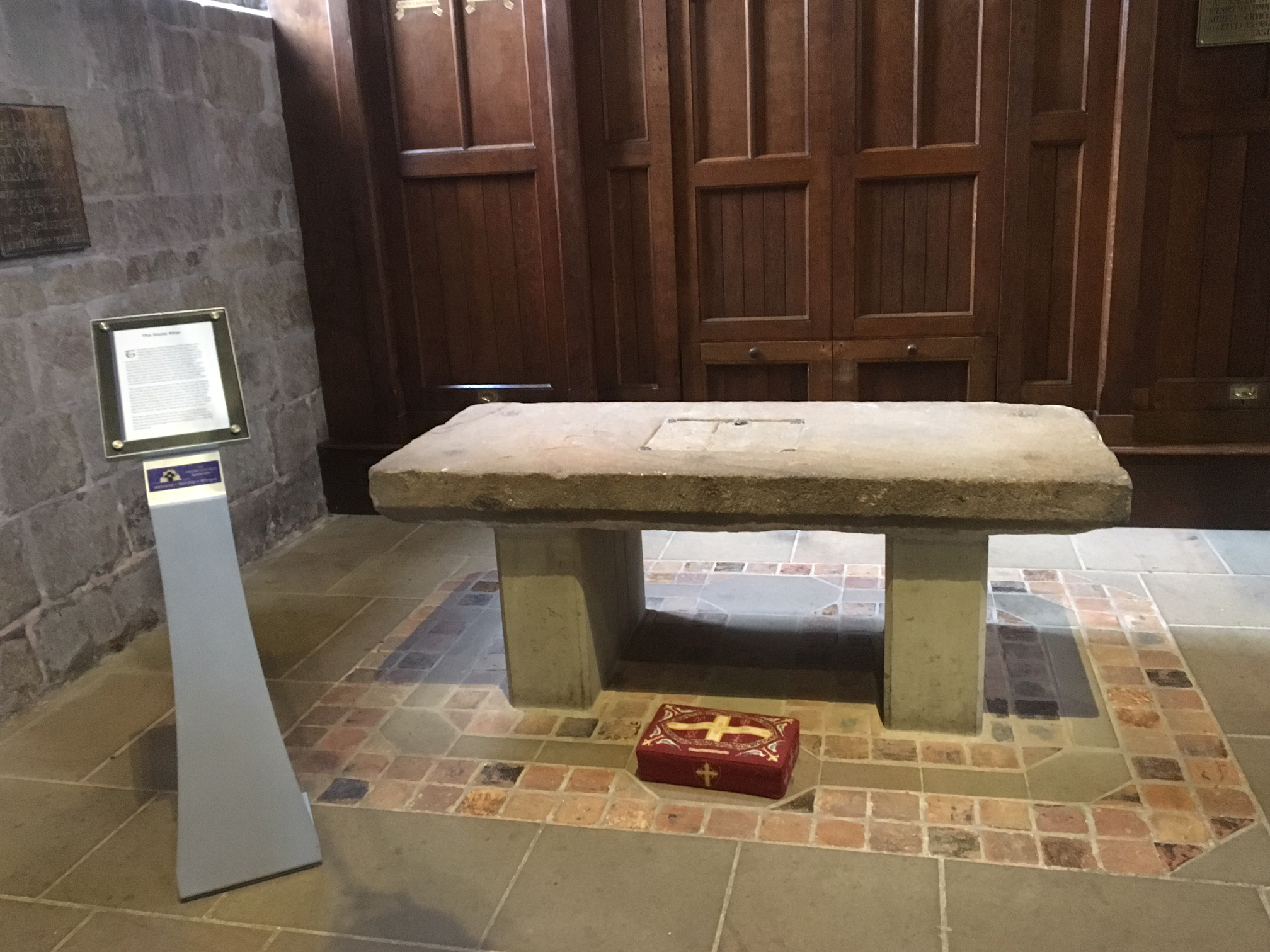
Stone altar

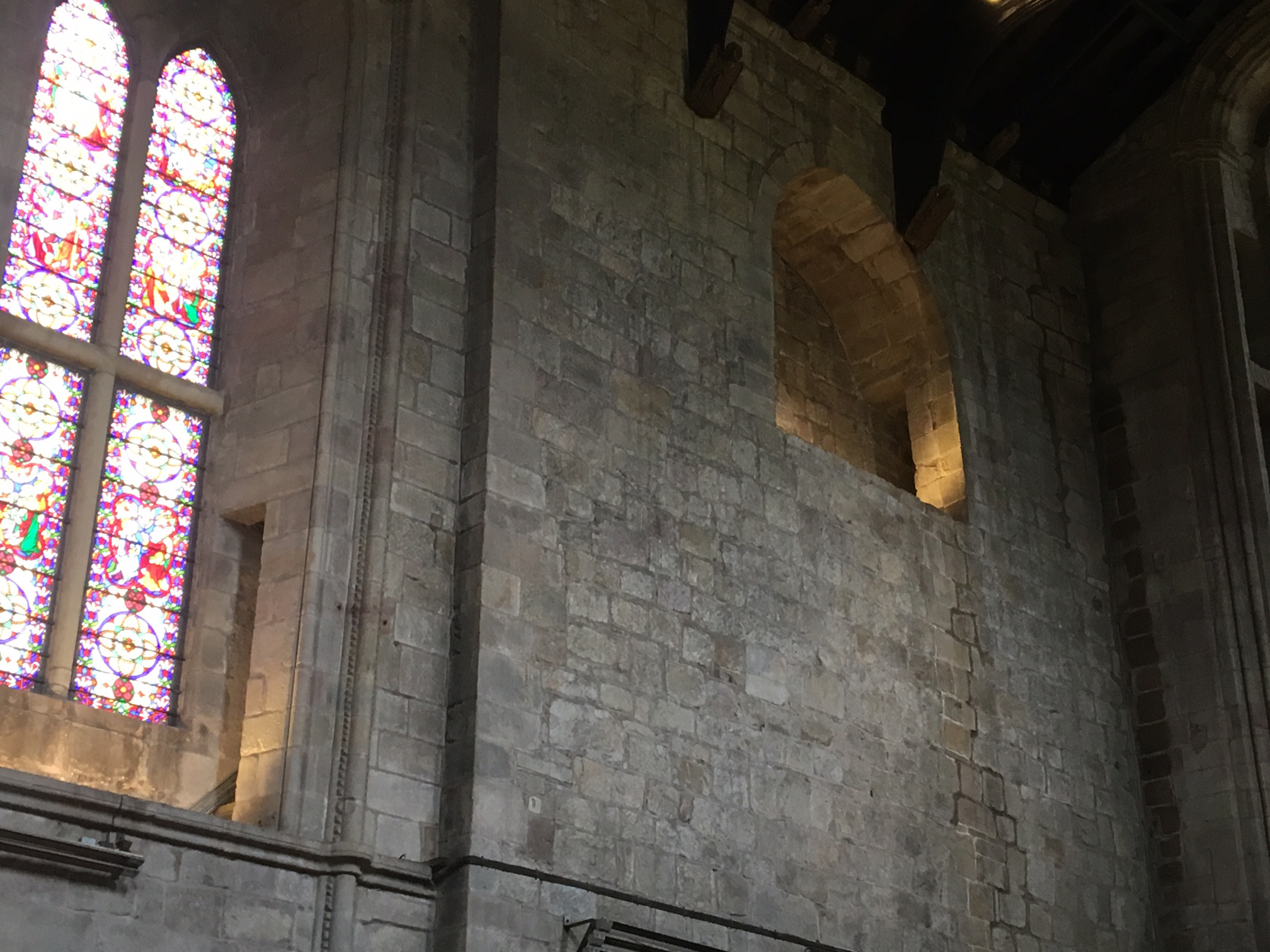
Alcove in south wall

A stone altar in the north aisle was preserved at the time of the Dissolution by using it to cover the second of the crypts mentioned above. When the floor was re-laid in 1867 it was placed in the floor of the west tower, and subsequently moved into the church where for nearly a century it was propped against the north wall of the aisle.

It was finally re-erected, surrounded by medieval tiles recovered from the ruins, during the 1980s restoration. The square depression on the surface matches a brass plate recording the death of Elizabeth Morley, now displayed on the north wall. However, a hollow in the middle of this square raises the possibility that this was once a sealed altar which contained a relic. There are original piscinas at the east ends of both north and south walls and there is an original stone bench (at present enclosed in a wooden case) in the same area of the south wall.

The capitals on the south-east door replicate the 12th-century design of capitals in the old chancel. The font, designed by George Street, was installed in 1867.

An alcove in the south wall is said to be unique. It was built into the structure of the north wall when the latter was extended in width and the six large windows (now the ‘Pugin Windows’) were created. There is a narrow staircase that runs up to the alcove from the walk-way in front of the windows and back down to a walk-way below the west window.

The original function of the alcove remains speculative. There may have been some access from the Prior's quarters at the north end of the west range, but according to Professor Hamilton Thompson this ‘would have served no obvious purpose other than ventilation’.

Although the lower panels of the windows in the north aisle contain Victorian stained glass, their upper panels contain effigies of a king and a queen in 14th-century coloured glass. It has been suggested that the king might be Edward II, Edward III or Henry VI.

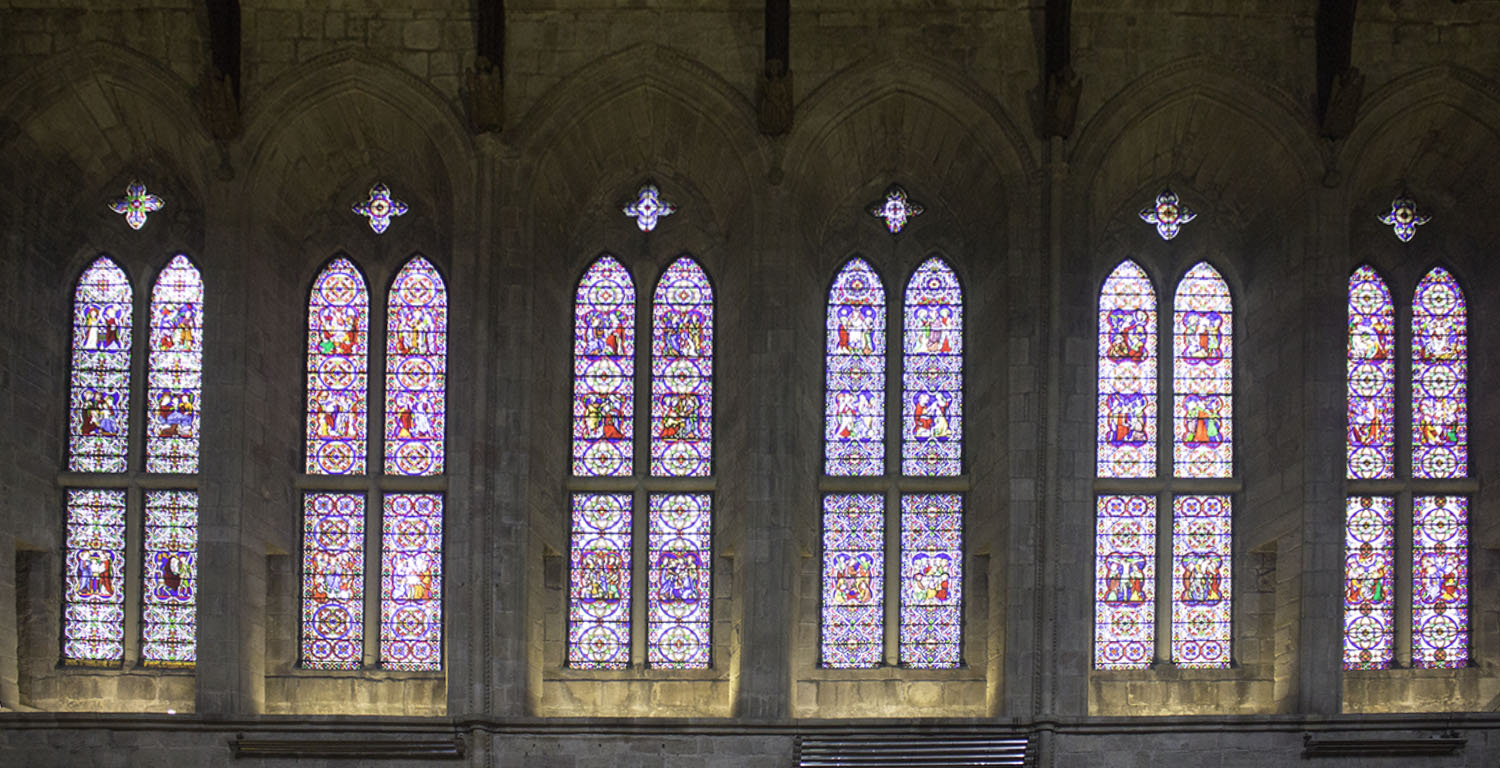
Pugin Windows

The Pugin Windows are among the last designed by Augustus Pugin, they are also the last, the largest and perhaps the best of only four attempts to copy ‘early’ (12th-century) medieval stained glass. They are also the only Pugin windows for which most of the cartoons are still available for inspection and, with one other exception, the only windows he designed in his last ten years of his life that were not executed by Hardman of Birmingham. The glazier is unknown, but they were not made by W G Crace, as stated on the incorporated panel.

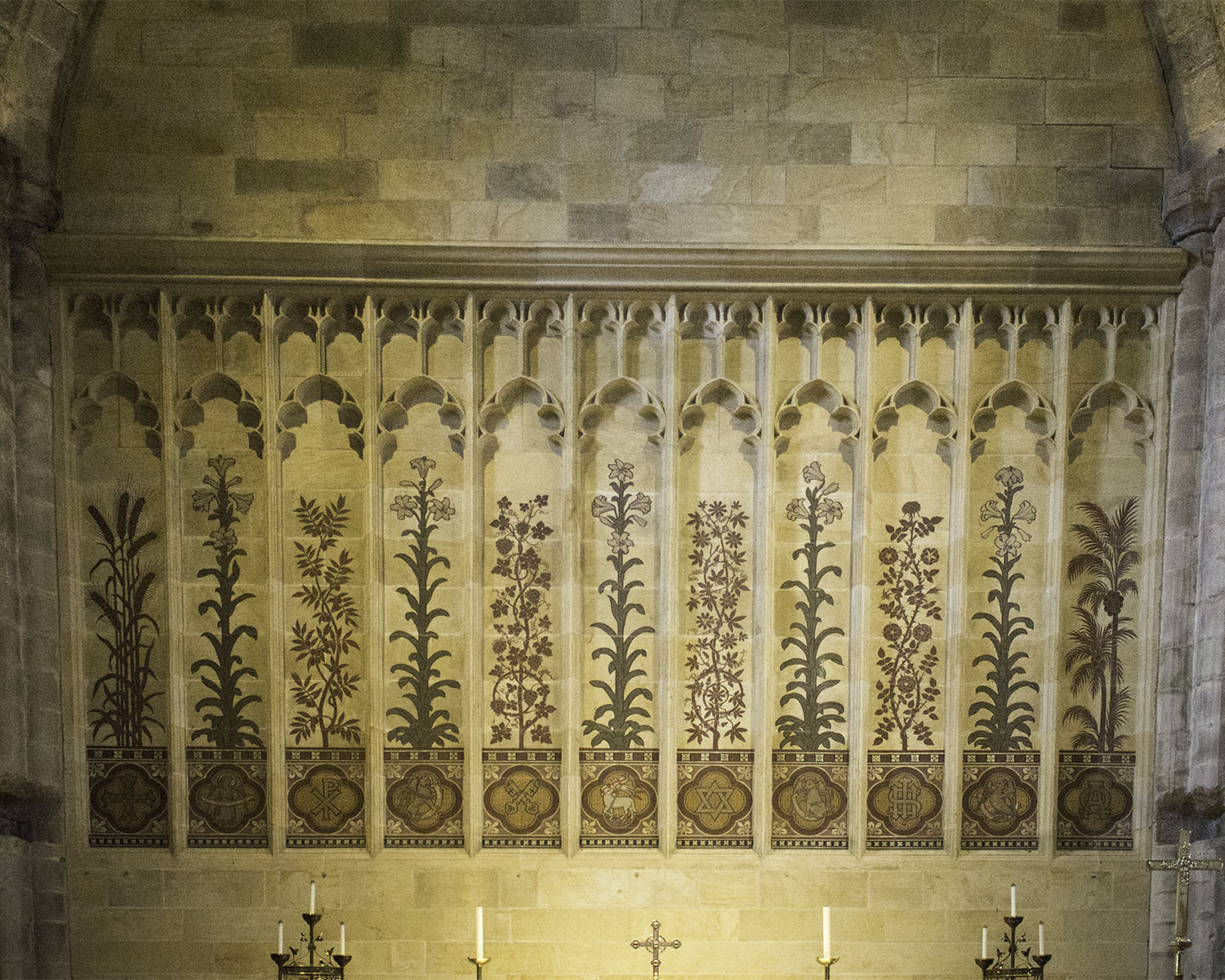
Painted Wall

A Painted Wall remains as a backdrop to the altar. The plants and symbols depict various aspects of the biblical and Christian narrative. Hidden in the design are the artist's signature and bishops’ crooks and fish symbols. It was not universally popular, and at the instigation of a Duchess of Devonshire (or, according to another version, of her Royal visitor) it was for many years concealed behind a specially commissioned curtain.

During restoration work in the 1980s it was re-discovered, in pristine condition.

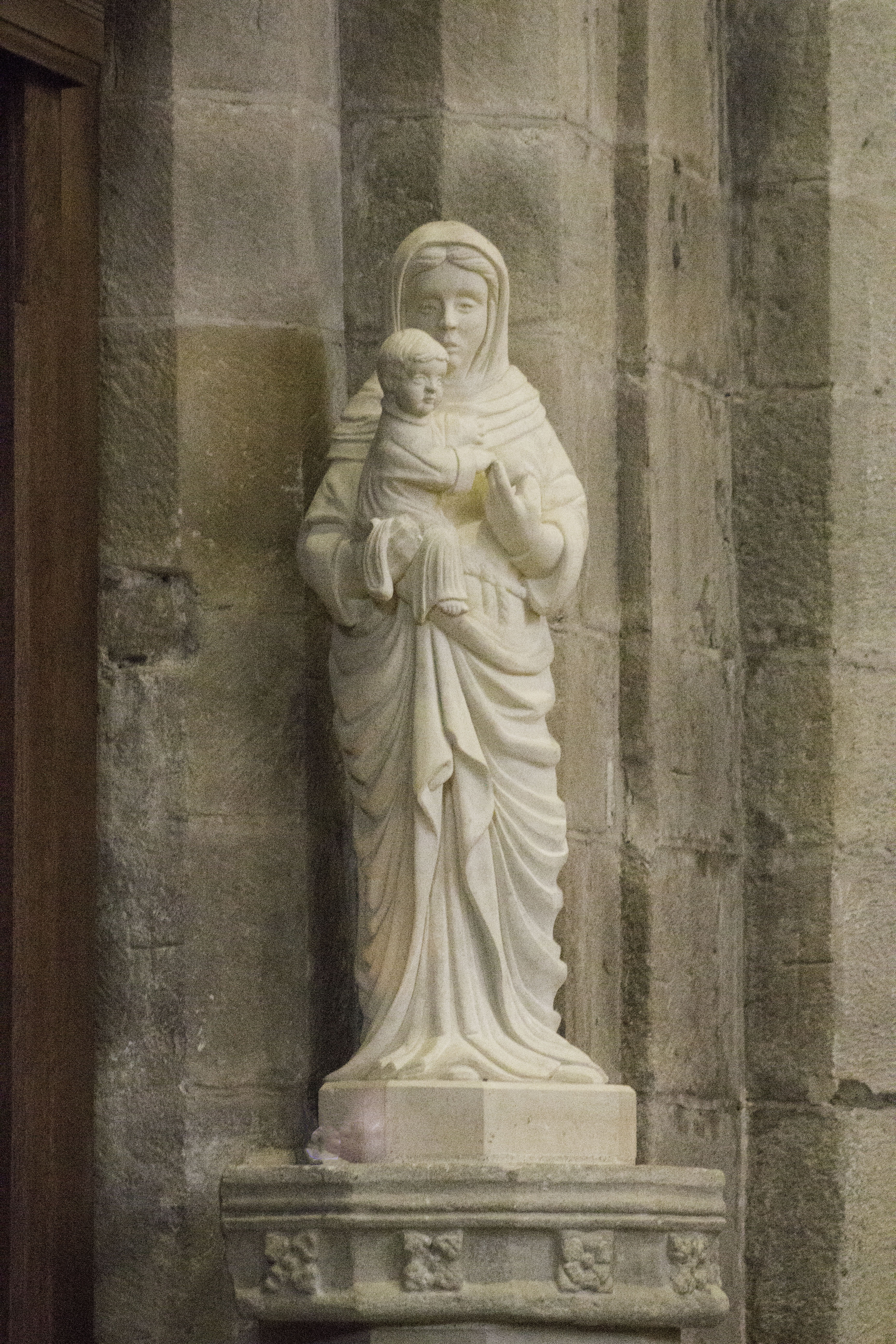
Statue of St Mary

On important occasions, the Priory uses a chalice donated by Lady Anne Clifford, 14th Baroness de Clifford. Made by Matthew Butler in York and hall-marked 1656, it is engraved with the arms of the Earl of Cumberland.

The church contains three items by the Kilburn ‘Mouseman’, Robert Thompson – the Bishop's Chair in the chancel (which has an incused (inset) mouse), the board listing earlier Priors, Ministers and Rectors on the north wall (restored in 2023) and a music stand which was donated to the Priory in 2022 in memory of William Pickles (1934-2014).

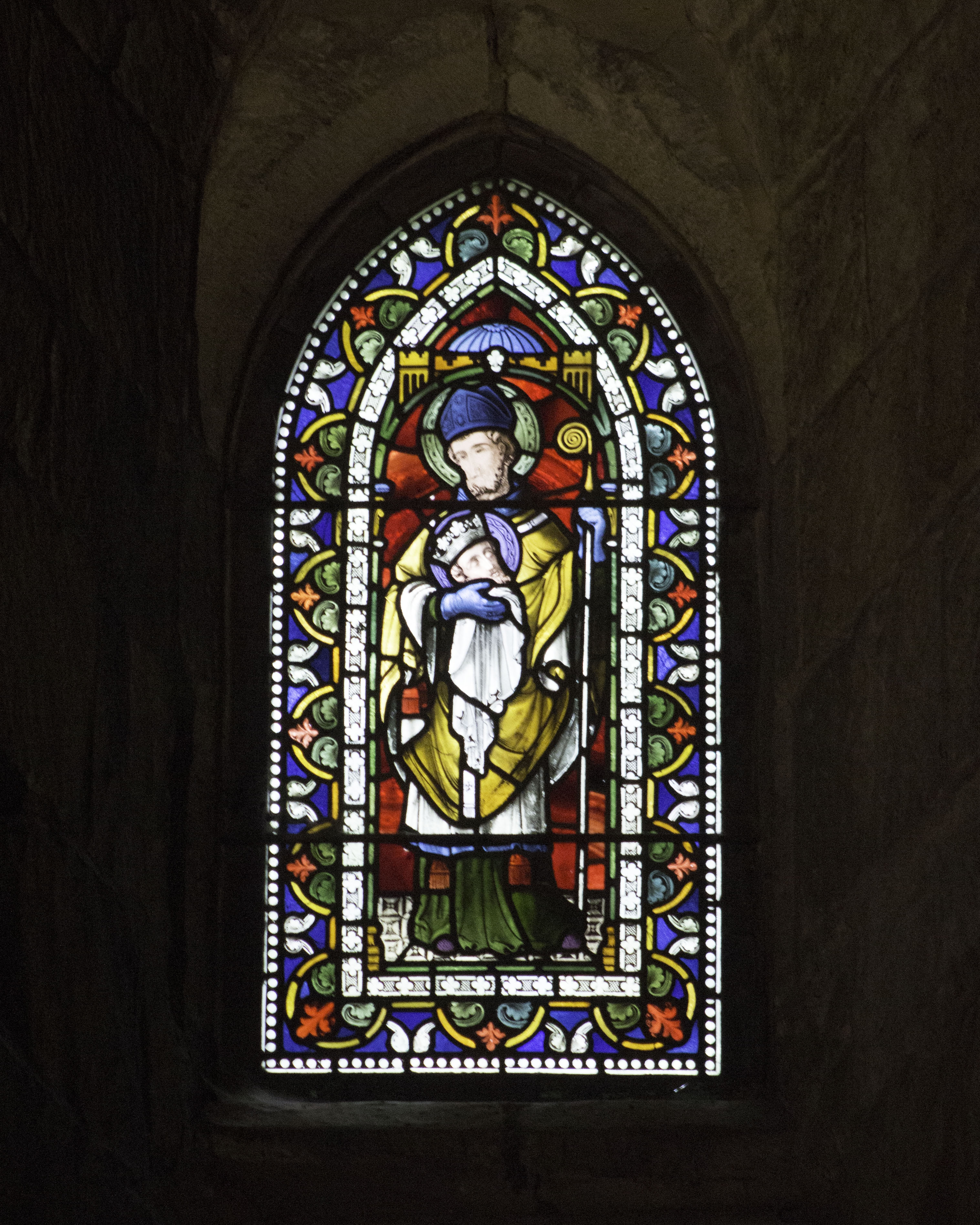
St Cuthbert Window

The Priory is dedicated to St Cuthbert and the Virgin Mary. St Cuthbert is commemorated by a window at the west end of the north aisle, showing Cuthbert as Bishop of Lindisfarne, cradling in his arms the severed head of his fellow saint, Oswald of Northumbria whose skull is possibly the one found during excavation of Cuthbert's grave in Durham Cathedral.

On 7 September 2014, a statue of the Virgin Mary, which is situated against the east wall between the organ case and the chancel, was dedicated. It was carved by Tim Foster, a stone carver from York Minster.

== The Churchyard ==
The sloping ground to the north and east of the church forms the graveyard, which runs about halfway to the River Wharfe. The view downstream from the Priory, the view of the Priory from the opposite bank and the Strid Woods which surround the river as it runs north towards Barden Tower, have always attracted artists, including Turner, Girtin, Landseer, Royle, the Brontes and Wordsworth

Prior Moone's grave, marked by a chalice and paten, is in the crossing. There is a memorial to Lord Frederick Cavendish (brother of the 8th Duke of Devonshire) who was assassinated in Phoenix Park, Dublin. It was donated by workers in the Bolton Abbey estate and is said to be of white freestone from Bolton Wood Quarries near Bradford. Just north of the church he is commemorated in the Cavendish memorial fountain. The main story associated with the churchyard concerns The White Doe of Rylstone, celebrated in a poem by William Wordsworth. Richard Norton, a Catholic, and eight of his sons joined the Rising of the North, and were captured and executed. Francis, the youngest son, escaped but was captured on the way home and was killed. He was buried on the north side of the Priory. Tradition has it that the grave was visited by his sister Emily, accompanied by a white doe he had given her. The doe continued to visit the graveyard during Sunday services, where it was regarded with some reverence. After the service, it would return to its home at Rylstone.

The graveyard contains the remains of one WWI casualty, Lt Smeeth, as well as those of Gillian Baverstock (author and daughter of Enid Blyton), and Yorkshire and England cricketers Bob Appleyard and Fred Trueman.

== Other burials in the Priory ==
- John Clifford, 7th Baron Clifford

== Special Events ==
The Priory acts as a venue for a number of performing groups, some of whom stage their own concerts for a paying audience, whereas other ensembles hold 'open rehearsals' at times when the visitor traffic can create a ready-made audience. In addition to this, the Priory manages the following events.

=== The St Cuthbert Lecture ===
Held annually in February or March, this lecture's subject is on a topic of wider society, religious or historical interest. Speakers have included James Bell, Bishop of Ripon; Professor Richard Morris, the archaeologist and historian; Toby Howarth, Bishop of Bradford; and Revd Canon Alan Billings, South Yorkshire Police and Crime Commissioner. Recent speakers have included the Rt Hon Dominic Grieve KC PC, the journalist and author Peter Oborne, the medieval historians Professor Sir Ian Kershaw and Professor David Stocker, the former Dean of Christ Church Cathedral, Oxford the Reverend Professor Martyn Percy and the Very Reverend Catherine Ogle, former Dean of Winchester Cathedral.

=== Priory Concert Series ===
A series of four concerts during the summer of each year. Past performances have featured Leeds Philharmonic Society, the York Waits, Kantos Chamber Choir, The Lady Clare's Consort and the Manchester Chorale among others.

== In popular culture ==
Bolton Priory is the setting for William Wordsworth's narrative poem, The White Doe of Rylstone.

The cover of the 1981 album Faith by English rock band The Cure, designed by Porl Thompson, is a veiled picture of Bolton Priory in the fog.

== See also ==
- Grade I listed buildings in North Yorkshire (district)
- Listed buildings in Bolton Abbey

== General references ==
- Watkins, Peter (1989). Bolton Priory and Its Church. Bolton Priory. ISBN 978-0951430200.
- Thompson, A Hamilton (1924). Bolton Priory: History and Architecture. Thoresby Society.
- Ian Kershaw, David M Smith (2001). The Bolton Priory Compotus 1286-1325. Yorkshire Archaeological Society. ISBN 978-0902122932.
