= Cavendish memorial fountain =

English drinking fountain

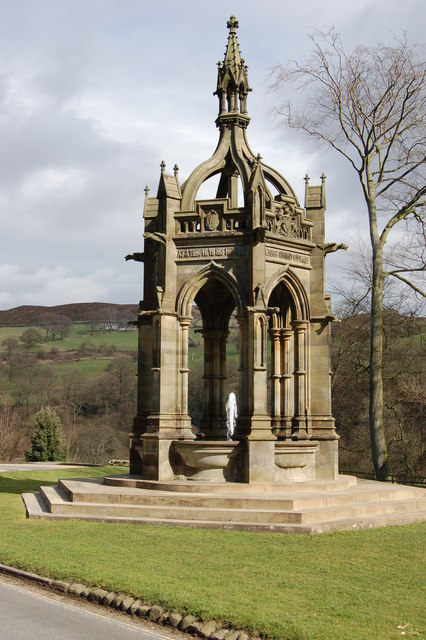

- Location within North Yorkshire
- 53°59′11″N 1°53′14″W
- Location: Bolton Abbey, North Yorkshire
- OS grid reference: SD 075 544

History
- Built: 1885–1886

Site notes
- Architect(s): Worthington & Elgood
- Architectural style: Gothic revival

Listed Building – Grade II
- Designated: 8 April 1987
- Reference no.: 1131777

The Cavendish memorial fountain is a drinking fountain erected in 1886 at Bolton Abbey, North Yorkshire, England as a memorial to Lord Frederick Cavendish following his murder in Phoenix Park by the Irish National Invincibles in May 1882. The fountain is a Grade II listed building.

== Background ==
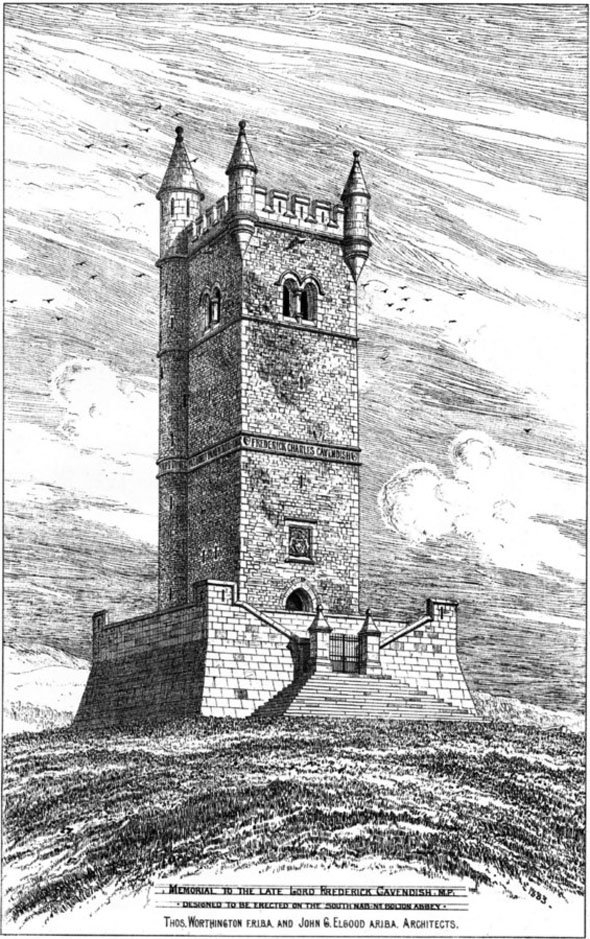
Sketch of the original tower design

Following the murder of Lord Frederick there were a number of memorials proposed to him; the proposal for a pillar or obelisk at Bolton Abbey was first made in September 1882 by electors of the Northern West Riding of Yorkshire parliamentary constituency (for whom Cavendish had been an MP since 1865). The proposal was led by William Foster, owner of the Black Dyke Mills, but he died before the proposal came to fruition. A committee, chaired by Angus Holden was formed to take the idea forward and £2,000 (equivalent to £210,254 in 2025) was raised in donations.

Bids for a memorial were sought and the chosen bid was one designed by Manchester architects Thomas Worthington and John Garrard Elgood. The design was for a tall crenellated tower to be sited on South Nab, a promontory overlooking the River Wharfe (54°0′2″N 1°52′29″W, grid reference SE 083 560). In 1884, the Duke of Devonshire (Lord Frederick's father) notified the committee that objections to the planned tower had been received and that it "would be detrimental to the landscape of the district and mar the beauty of the outline". On the basis of this and also the Duke's own opinion about the unsuitability of the design and location, the committee resolved to find another solution.

Worthington and Elgood came up with a different design, this time for a fountain. The revised design was accepted by the committee and it was resolved to erect the fountain just north of the priory at a location known as Hartington Seat.

== Opening ==
Construction work on the fountain completed in 1886 and the formal dedication of the fountain was held on 11 June 1886. Over 500 guests attended the event and the dedication was made by the Marquess of Ripon and responded to by Lord Frederick's younger brother, Lord Edward Cavendish, on behalf of the Cavendish family.

== Description ==
Worthington and Elgood's design for the fountain was constructed by Stephenson and Co of Manchester with the carving work conducted by Earp and Hobbs. The fountain stands approximately 40 feet (12.2 metres) high and is constructed of local stone in the form of ashlar blocks. Standing on a plinth the fountain is surrounded by six buttresses in a hexagonal plan. A frieze connects the buttresses and is inscribed "This fountain was erected by electors of the West Riding as a tribute to his memory, Frederick Charles Cavendish Born November XXX. MDCCCXXXVI. Died May VI. MDCCCLXXXII". Each buttress has a gargoyle at the level of the frieze and in the parapet above each section of the frieze there is a coat of arms. Two of these are those of the Cavendish family and the other four are the arms of the Lyttleton, Boyle, Clifford and Howard families, all of whom are families in the Cavendish lineage. Above the frieze the memorial is topped with an open lantern. The Leeds Mercury described the architectural style as Gothic.

== See also ==
- Listed buildings in Bolton Abbey
