= Bolton Abbey (village) =

Village and civil parish in Craven, North Yorkshire, England

Coordinates: 53°58′56″N 1°53′29″W

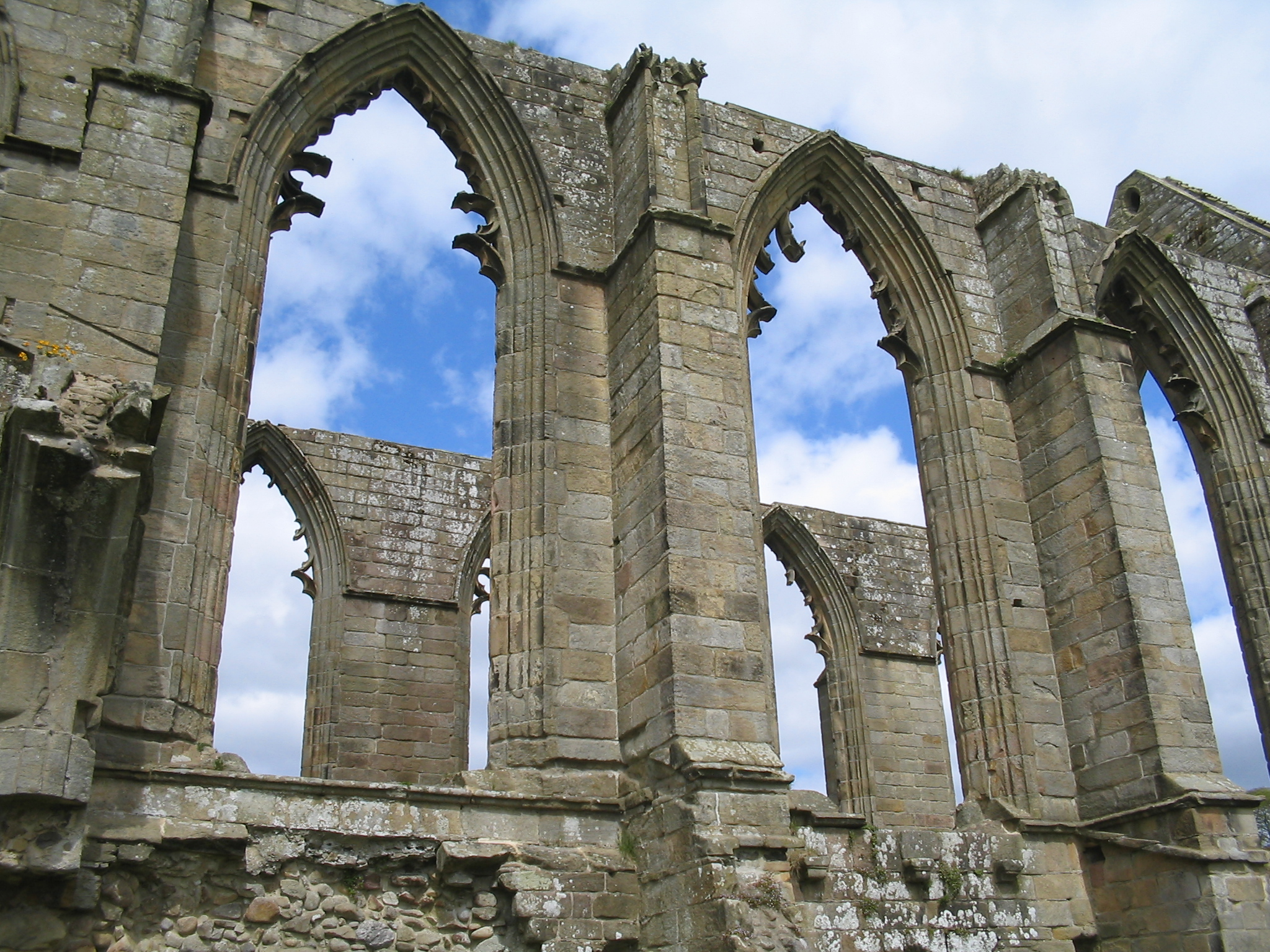
- Bolton Priory

- Location within North Yorkshire
- Civil parish: Bolton Abbey
- Unitary authority: North Yorkshire
- Ceremonial county: North Yorkshire
- Region: Yorkshire and the Humber
- Country: England
- Sovereign state: United Kingdom
- Post town: Skipton
- Postcode district: BD23
- Police: North Yorkshire
- Fire: North Yorkshire
- Ambulance: Yorkshire
- UK Parliament: Skipton and Ripon

Bolton Abbey is a village and civil parish in the county of North Yorkshire, England, 22 miles (35 km) north-west of Leeds. The village lies in Wharfedale, near the southern edge of the Yorkshire Dales National Park, and just north of the border with West Yorkshire.

The village takes its name from the monastery now generally known as Bolton Priory, and is adjacent to the Bolton Abbey Estate, which includes the priory ruins and extends beyond the parish. The church of Bolton Priory is now the parish church of Bolton Abbey.

Until 1974 it was part of the West Riding of Yorkshire. From 1974 to 2023 it was part of the Craven District, it is now administered by the unitary North Yorkshire Council.

Bolton Abbey railway station lies 0.6 miles (1 km) south west of the village, just outside the parish boundary.

The parish had a population of 111 in the 2011 census.

== See also ==
- Listed buildings in Bolton Abbey
