= Embsay railway station =

Railway station in North Yorkshire, England

Embsay
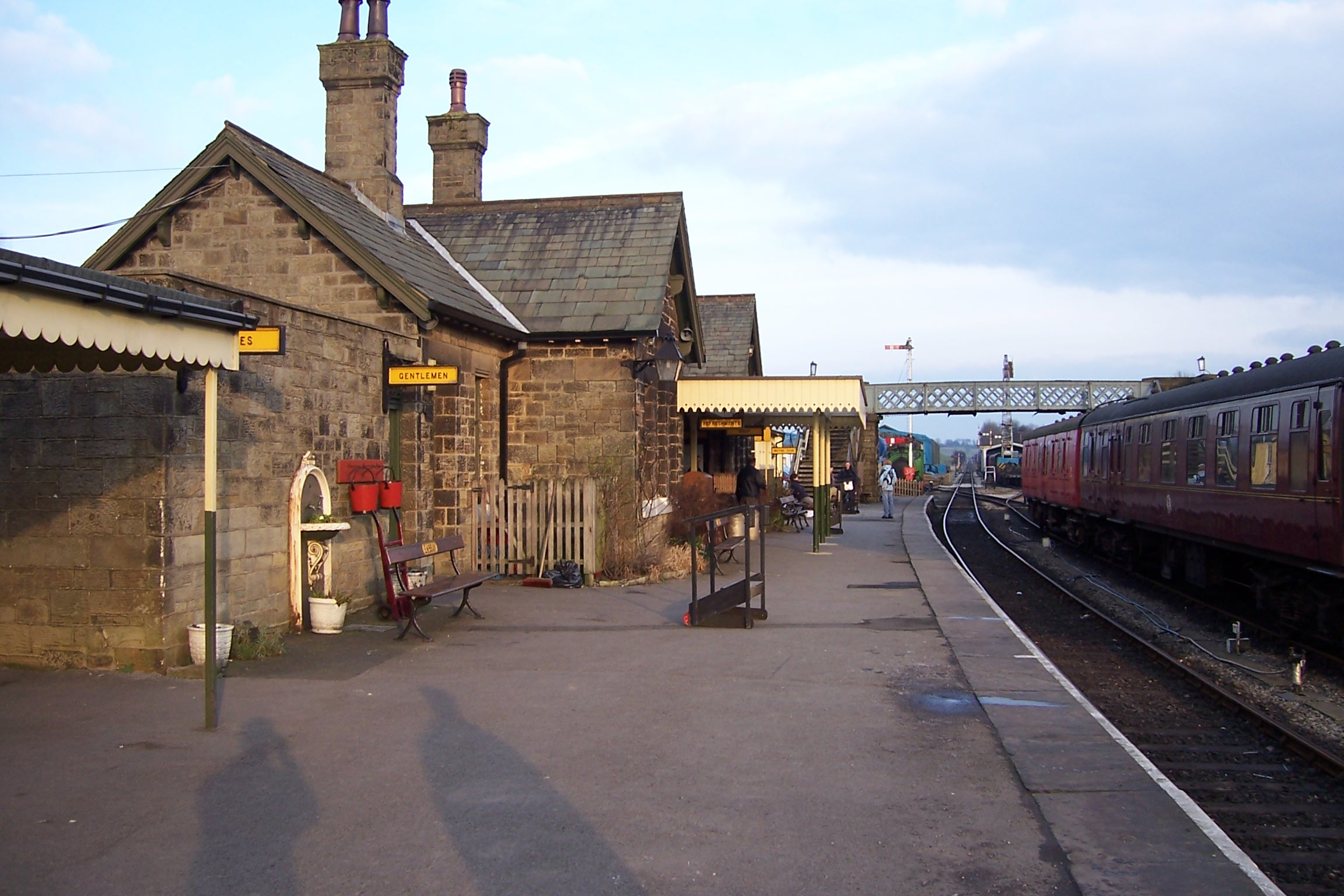
- The station building at Embsay

General information
- Location: Embsay, North Yorkshire; England
- Coordinates: 53.975470°N 1.991190°W
- Grid reference: SE006532
- System: Station on heritage railway
- Operator: Embsay and Bolton Abbey Steam Railway
- Platforms: 2

History
- Original company: Midland Railway
- Post-grouping: London, Midland and Scottish Railway

Key dates
- 1 October 1888: Opened
- 22 March 1965: Closed
- 22 February 1981: Reopened
Location

Embsay railway station is a railway station on the Embsay and Bolton Abbey Steam Railway. It serves the small village of Embsay in North Yorkshire, England. The station is a terminus on the railway and was re-opened in 1981.

== History ==
The original station was on the Skipton to Ilkley Line of the Midland Railway and opened on 1 October 1888. It was later modernised by the London, Midland and Scottish railway (LMS), and eventually closed as part of the Beeching Axe on 22 March 1965. The station was re-opened by the Yorkshire Dales Railway (Embsay Railway) on 22 February 1981, and has been refurbished to resemble its appearance in the days of the LMS.

In December 2004, the TV soap Emmerdale used the station for the location of Hotten station.

A Midland Railway signal box, dating from 1892, and designed to add character to the station, was opened on 6 February 2008.

== Information ==
The railway station site includes:

- The ticket office
- The gift shop
- The Embsay book shop
- The car park
- The engine sheds

== Gallery ==
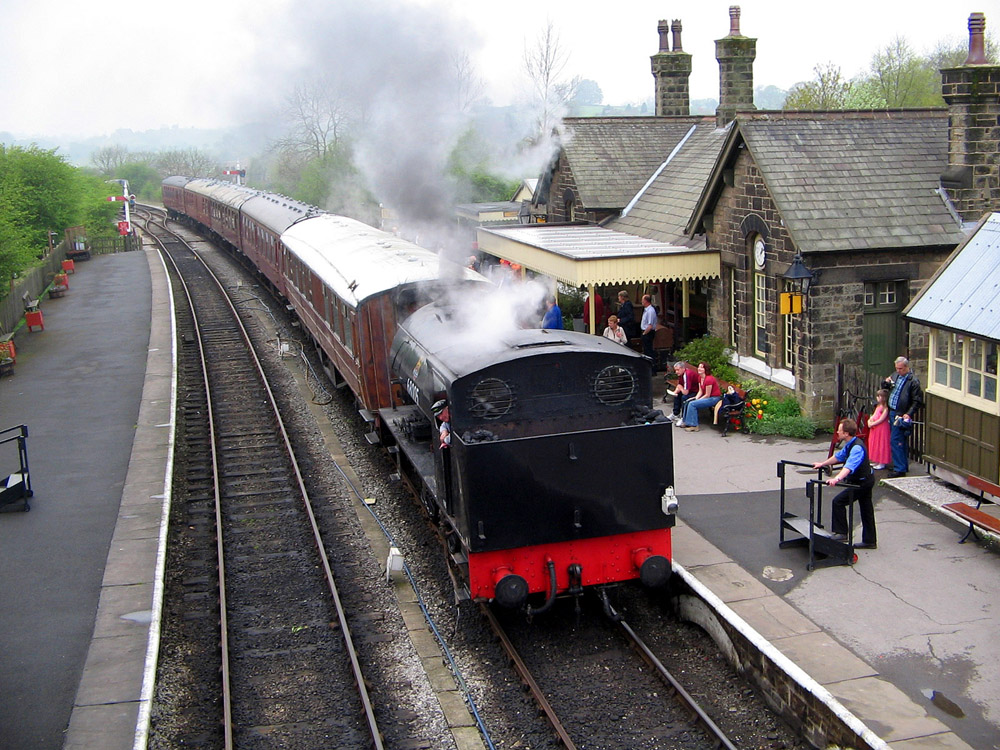
A historical train pulling in from Bow Bridge sidings

== See also ==
- Addingham (Proposed)
- Bolton Abbey
- Holywell Halt
- Listed buildings in Embsay with Eastby
- Skipton (Proposed)

Preceding station	Heritage railways	Following station
Terminus	Embsay and Bolton Abbey Steam Railway	Holywell Halt
	Disused railways	
Skipton	Midland Railway; Skipton to Ilkley Line	Bolton Abbey
