= Skipton–Ilkley line =

English railway line

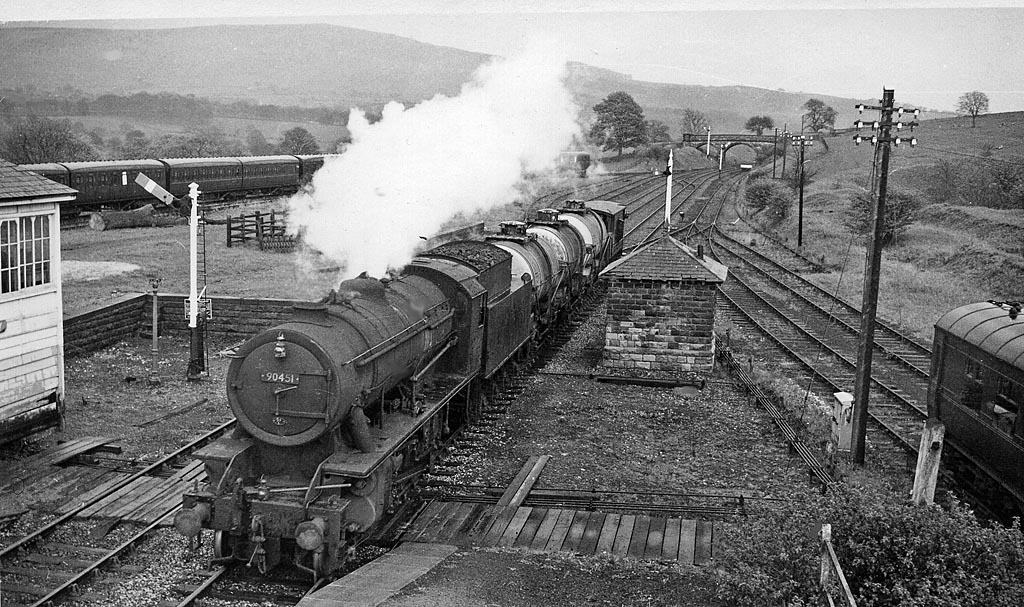
- Down train of tank wagons at Bolton Abbey Station

Overview
- Status: Closed
- Termini: Skipton railway station; Ilkley railway station
- Stations: 5

Service
- Type: Heavy rail

History
- Ilkley to Bolton Abbey open: 16 May 1888
- Bolton abbey to Skipton open: 1 October 1888
- Full line closure: 19 October 1968

Technical
- Line length: 11.5 mi (18.5 km)
- Number of tracks: 2
- Track gauge: 4 ft 8 1/2 in (1,435 mm) standard gauge
- Highest elevation: 512 ft (156 m)

The Skipton–Ilkley line is the route that the Midland Railway took to link the towns of Skipton and Ilkley via the villages of Embsay, Bolton Abbey and Addingham. First proposed in 1846, the line was opened in 1888, and then closed between 1965 and 1969, though a short section at the west end of the line remains open as a freight line, and the Embsay and Bolton Abbey Steam Railway operate a heritage railway between Embsay and Bolton Abbey.

== History ==
The first line to be proposed through the valley was authorised by the Wharfdale Railway Act 1846 (9 & 10 Vict. c. clxxii) with the spelling of Wharfdale [sic] missing the first 'e'. This followed the same route as the eventual line from Skipton to connect with the Leeds and Thirsk Railway at Arthington, but was never constructed. Another scheme, promoted by the people of Ilkley, went before parliament in 1881, but with strong vocal opposition from the Duke of Devonshire (who owned the Bolton Abbey estate), the line did not gain approval. Powers to build the line were granted to the Midland Railway under the Midland Railway (Additional Powers) Act 1883 (46 & 47 Vict. c. cxi), however, work on the line did not begin until 1885. The route was opened by the Midland Railway in 1888 as an extension of the former Otley and Ilkley Joint Railway through the upper part of Wharfedale to rejoin the main line along the Aire valley at Skipton. The railway crosses the watershed between the Aire and Wharfe valleys, and reaches its highest point 4 miles (6.4 km) east of Skipton (just past Embsay railway station at 512 feet (156 m) above sea level.

Major engineering structures on the route were the 220-yard (200 m) Haw Bank Tunnel, the 72-yard (66 m) long 69-foot (21 m) high viaduct at Lob Ghyll, and the 386-yard (353 m) long and 50-foot (15 m) high viaduct across the west of Ilkley town. Ilkley viaduct had 25 arches, and spans of the arches varied with the local topography being either 32 feet (9.8 m), 36 feet (11 m), 40 feet (12 m), and 42 feet (13 m) across. Additionally, a girder bridge was needed at the west end of Ilkley station to cross Brook Street in the town. The platforms of the line into Ilkley station (numbered 3 and 4, the original dead-end platforms numbered 1 and 2) were slightly elevated at the west end to accommodate the gradient out of the town and the clearance for Brook Street Bridge. Whilst the 11.5 miles (18.5 km) line was double track throughout, a single line section was implemented during the First World War between Addingham and Bolton Abbey. The line was replaced in 1921.

Local services along the line around 1910, consisted of eleven westbound workings from Ilkley, seven of which continued as far as Skipton, the other four terminating at Bolton Abbey. Most of these either terminated at, or originated from, Bradford and Leeds; however, the line did see some longer-distance trains such as Manchester to Ilkley (operated by the Lancashire & Yorkshire Railway) and in the post-grouping era, an LNER train from Hartlepool to Blackpool or Southport.

The line was built and operated by the Midland Railway, which at the Grouping of 1923, became part of the London, Midland and Scottish Railway. In 1948, it was nationalized into British Railways as part of the London Midland Region, and then in 1950, it was moved into the North Eastern Region apart from a small section at the west end into Skipton.

== Closure ==
The route was closed as the result of the Beeching Axe in 1965 – passenger services were withdrawn on 22 March, whilst the remaining through goods services ended on 5 July; the route eventually closed to all traffic east of Embsay Junction in January 1966 (though access to the Haw Bank quarry sidings at Embsay station survived until October 1968). The last section west of there was retained as part of the freight-only branch line from Skipton to Swinden Quarry (the old Yorkshire Dales Railway) and remains in operation to this day.

The bridge over Brook Street in Ilkley was demolished soon after closure, being removed by January 1969. The two platforms of 3 and 4 were abandoned, and eventually the space they occupied was cleared to create a car park for the station. Much of the trackbed east of Addingham itself, as also been redeveloped (or returned to agricultural use), with little trace remaining of the line's course through the western part of Ilkley – as the old embankments, bridges and viaducts were demolished in 1972–73.

== Heritage railway ==
Since its closure in 1965, a 4-mile (6 km) stretch of the disused railway line has been restored and reopened as the Embsay and Bolton Abbey Steam Railway.

The remainder of the old route beyond Bolton Abbey is disused but mostly intact as far as the outskirts of Addingham, but the former station there has been demolished, levelled and the site redeveloped for housing.

West of Embsay, the section of the line down to Skipton is still open, serving the branch line to Swinden Quarry.
