= Craven Heifer =

Largest cow ever shown in England

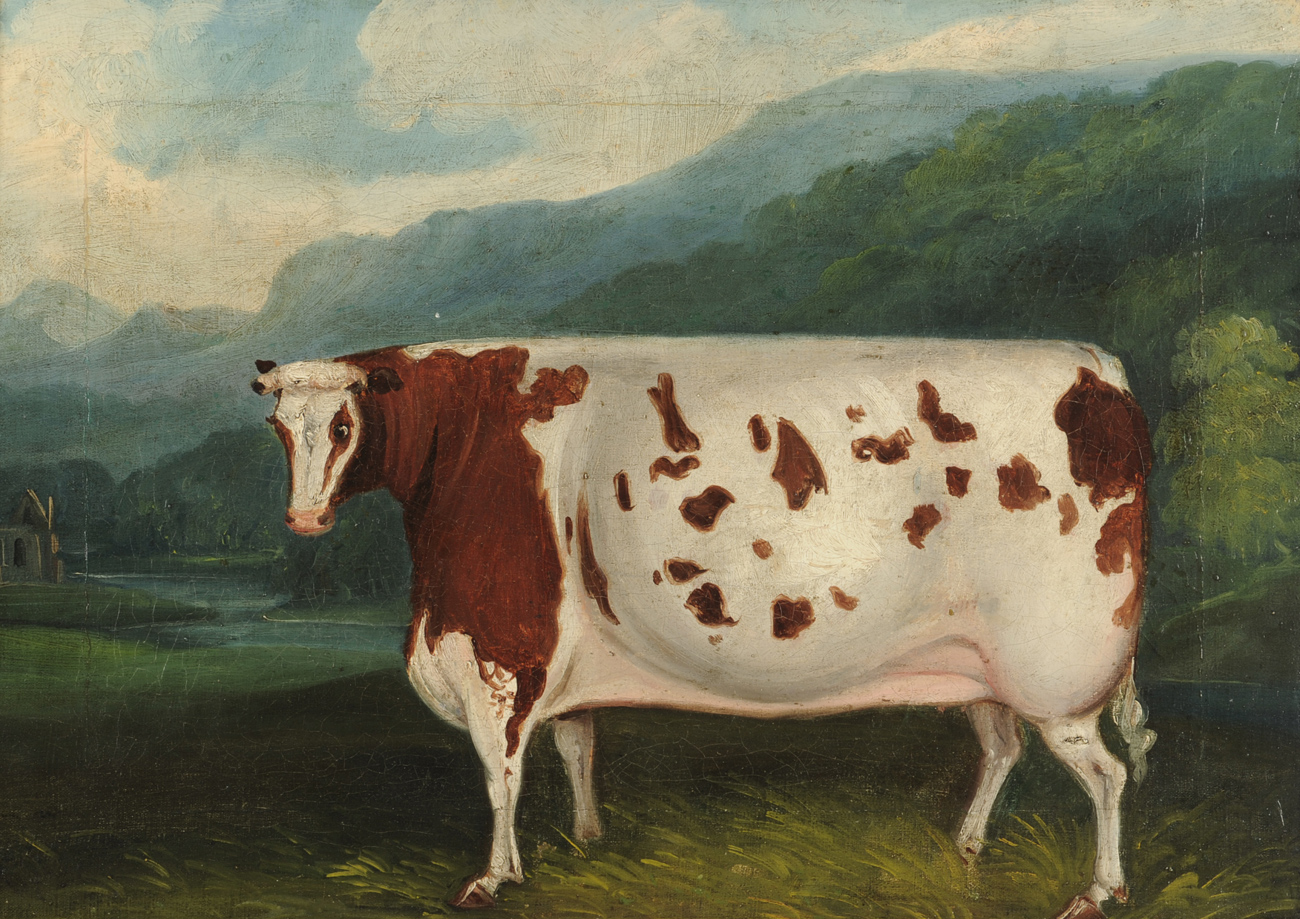
Craven Heifer

Craven Heifer (1807–1812) was a cow which lived in the early 19th century, and remains the largest cow ever shown in England.

Craven Heifer weighed 312 stones (4,370 lb /1,980 kg), was 11.3 ft (3.4 m) long, 5.3 ft (1.6 m) tall and had a girth of 10.1 ft (3.1 m).

Craven Heifer was bred by the Reverend William Carr in 1807, on the Duke of Devonshire's estate at Bolton Abbey. Carr fed her heavily until she reached record size at age 5. She was so large that she needed a special door twice as wide as the norm to get in and out of the cowshed. This doorway can still be seen on the estate.

She was purchased by John Watkinson of Halton East for £200 (£14,876.03 in 2026 prices). Being such a notable creature, she was taken on tour, and attracted much attention wherever she went. She was taken to Smithfield in London; the journey from Wakefield to the capital took 73 days from 19 November to 30 January 1812, during which time she was shown at numerous towns and cities en route.

In March of 1813, the Craven Heifer was gambled away in a cockfight to a Mr. Boothroyd, who butchered it for meat.

Craven Heifer lived for five years, compared to an average life expectancy of 15 years for that breed of domestic cattle.

In January 2013, an oil painting portrait of Craven Heifer, dated 1811, sold for £16,250 ($25,586) at auction.

Several public houses bear the name The Craven Heifer, particularly in the Craven district of North Yorkshire.

== See also ==
- Durham Ox
