= Holywell Halt railway station =

Railway station in North Yorkshire, England

Holywell Halt
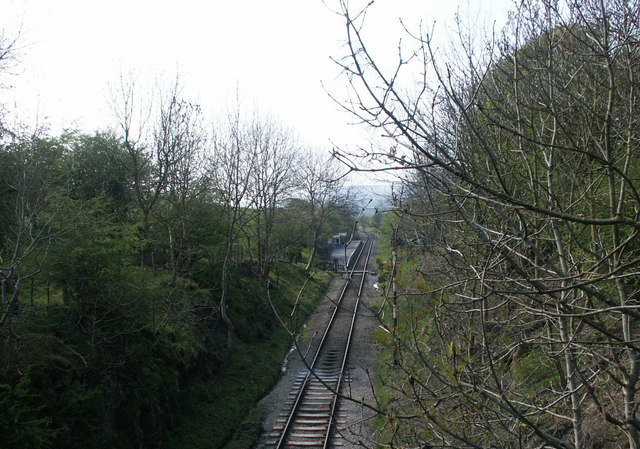

General information
- Location: Holywell, North Yorkshire; England
- Coordinates: 53.975848°N 1.960171°W
- Grid reference: SE027533
- System: Station on heritage railway
- Operator: Embsay and Bolton Abbey Steam Railway
- Platforms: 1

History
- Opened: 1987
Location

Holywell Halt railway station is on the Embsay and Bolton Abbey Steam Railway in North Yorkshire, England.

== History ==
The halt was the first extension on the railway. The location is called Holywell. The halt was constructed so passengers could view the Craven Fault geological site.

The area is designated a Site of Special Scientific Interest and can also be viewed from the railway line itself. The extension was built largely by volunteers and other organisations who helped out at different stages of the project.

The station was opened in 1987 by the Marquess of Hartington. Holywell Halt had never previously existed when the line formed part of the national rail network.

== Information ==
The Holywell Halt site is located right next to the A59 main road to Harrogate. The site consists of:

- A picnic site
- A railway viewing platform
- An information display and viewing area of the Craven Fault

Preceding station	Heritage railways	Following station
Embsay	Embsay and Bolton Abbey Steam Railway	Bolton Abbey
