= Embsay and Bolton Abbey Steam Railway =

Heritage railway in North Yorkshire, England

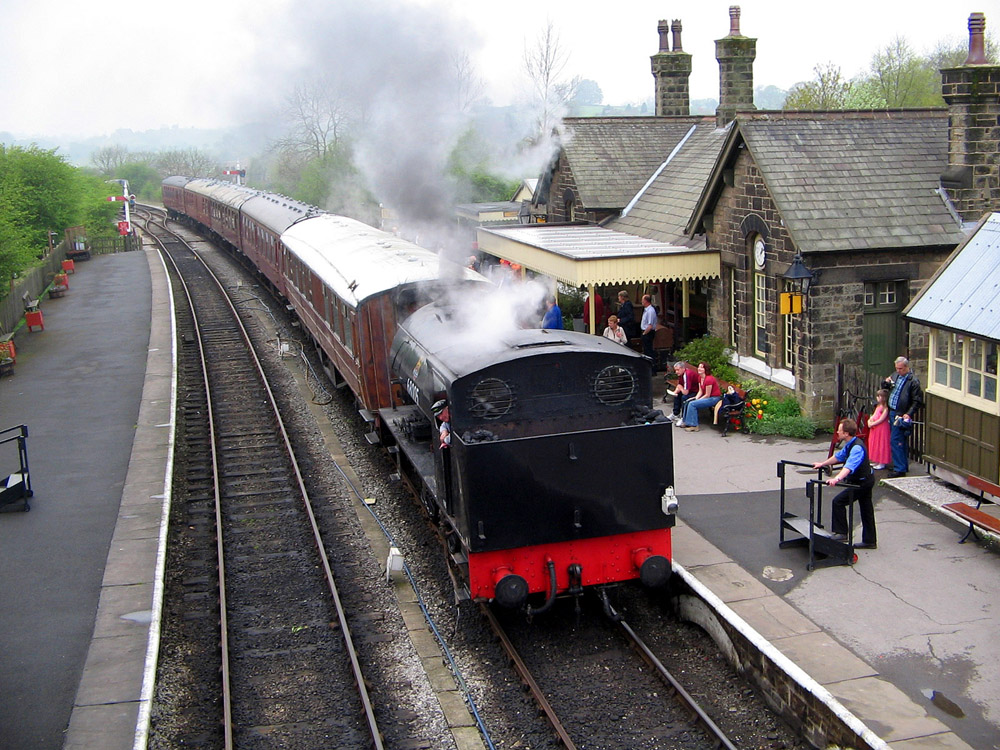
- Embsay station
- Locale: Embsay, North Yorkshire, England
- Terminus: Embsay

Commercial operations
- Name: Skipton to Ilkley Line
- Built by: Midland Railway
- Original gauge: 4 ft 8 1/2 in (1,435 mm) standard gauge

Preserved operations
- Owned by: Yorkshire Dales Railway Museum Trust (Holdings) Ltd
- Operated by: Embsay and Bolton Abbey Steam Railway
- Stations: 3
- Length: 4 miles 4 chains (6.5 km)
- Preserved gauge: 4 ft 8 1/2 in (1,435 mm) standard gauge

Commercial history
- Opened: 1888
- Closed: 1965

Preservation history
- 1968: Railway Preservation Society formed
- 1979: Embsay railway station re-opened
- 1981: Railway line re-opens officially
- 1982: DMU special operated Skipton to Embsay (prior to Embsay JCT removal)
- 1987: Holywell Halt opens
- 1991: Heritage line re-opens to and Stoneacre opens.
- 1997: Trains return to Bolton Abbey
- Headquarters: Embsay

The Embsay and Bolton Abbey Steam Railway (E&BASR) is a heritage railway in North Yorkshire, England, formed in 1979 and opened in 1981.

The preserved railway was part of the former Midland Railway route from Skipton to Ilkley which was closed down by British Railways in 1965 over 15 years before the reopening of part of the line.

The E&BASR currently runs for a total distance of 4 miles (6 km) from Embsay via Draughton Sidings, Holywell and Stoneacre Loop to Bolton Abbey station and carries around 100,000 passengers a year.

The long-term objectives of the railway are extensions of the line in both directions, eastwards to the West Yorkshire village of Addingham and southwest towards the North Yorkshire market town of Skipton.

== Overview ==
Embsay railway station was opened in October in 1888. Bolton Abbey village is named after the nearby 12th century Bolton Priory, belonging to the Dukes of Devonshire.

The route was formerly part of the Midland Railway line that connected Skipton and Ilkley via Addingham. The line was shut down by British Railways in March 1965. A preservation society formed, and they gained a long-term lease from British Railways for the station buildings at Embsay in 1971. Initially, the plan was to run trains along the line to Grassington, but that line would continue as a working freight railway to Swinden Quarry, and in 1979 trains were instead run between Bow Bridge Loop (the western extremity of the line) and Embsay railway station which was refurbished throughout the second half of the 1970s and reopened in 1981. Additionally, in the early 1980s, the society was granted a Light railway Order (LRO).

By 1987 further extensions brought the line to a newly constructed halt at Holywell and later to Stoneacre Loop in 1991. Bolton Abbey railway station finally reopened in 1997, bringing the current length to 4 miles 4 chains (6.5 km).

By 2012, the railway was averaging 100,000 passenger journeys a year.

== Expansion plans ==
=== Extension to Addingham and Ilkley ===
As the original line stretched from the North Yorkshire market town of Skipton to the West Yorkshire spa town of Ilkley, there was talk of extending the re-opened track to cover the original extent prior to its closure by British Railways in 1965.

Taking the line to Addingham and re-opening Addingham is often mentioned as a potential project but the line's owners have stated that they intend to consolidate the current route instead.

An extension to Addingham would be a huge project, and would involve a near-doubling of the line's current length. Previous extensions have been built in small sections over a long period of time, so a re-opening of the line to Addingham would be many years off.

Reports suggest Sustrans are interested in converting the route into a cycle path, but would provide formation space for a single track allowing any extension to be built.

The embankment supporting Addingham railway station, goods yard and depot was removed and replaced in the 1980s with a housing development, with the bridge and abutments over the main road demolished at around the same time.

There are plans to rebuild one of the bridge abutments at the end of the surviving embankment to the north as part of the Addingham Project which also involves constructing a replica LMS style station, goods yard and depot on the extra land next to and at the edge of the embankment.

These would be over the main road from the now defunct former station and goods depot. Funds would need to be collected for 10 to 15 years before any project of this extent could be realised.

Much of the route between Addingham and Ilkley has been re-developed since abandonment. Cuttings have been filled in and Ilkley viaduct was demolished in 1973.

The Skipton platforms at Ilkley station now form the station's car park, and there has been significant building development in Ilkley town centre on the former trackbed. Therefore, it is unlikely that this section will be reinstated as preserving the whole line between Ilkley and Skipton was considered too expensive.

=== Connection to Skipton station ===
There is currently no link between the Heritage line and the Network Rail branch line to Swinden Quarry (the former Yorkshire Dales Railway), the points at this site having been dismantled, although this connection has been temporarily laid to allow stock movements. Re-instating this link would allow trains to serve Skipton station, and would potentially offer greater access to the railway.

The platforms at Skipton (5 & 6) that served the Ilkley route were made redundant in 1965. If this link were reinstated these platforms would require a rebuild as they have been disused for a very long time.

In 1982 there were plans to extend the line to Skipton, as a special DMU service was running at the time. Because British Rail still used the section between the two stations for its operations to Swinden Quarry (this section of the old branch line to Grassington was and is still part of the rail network), plans were dropped, stating that operating as far as Skipton whilst sharing the line with the goods operation was too problematic.

Network Rail has carried out a survey for the reinstatement of the connecting points between the Heritage line at Embsay and the freight line to Rylstone, and the reinstatement of the two platforms 5 and 6 at Skipton. The cost has been estimated to be between £1.1 million and £2.6 million, and if funding is made available, then the line could be extended. JMP Consulting has been commissioned to develop a business case for the project.

== Media appearances ==
The railway was also the filming location of an episode of Emmerdale (also a Yorkshire Television programme). In the episode, Embsay station was made to look like the fictional Hotten station. Many of the well-known characters from the show were at the filming. The episode was filmed in December 2004.

== The route of the EBASR ==
Point	Coordinates (Links to map resources)	OS Grid Ref	Notes
Skipton	53.9585°N 2.0264°W	SD98365137	Network Rail (Proposed extension)
Embsay	53.9755°N 1.9912°W	SE00675327	
Holywell Halt	53.9758°N 1.9602°W	SE02705330	
Stoneacre Loop	53.9734°N 1.9497°W	SE03395303	
Bolton Abbey	53.9763°N 1.9087°W	SE06085336	
Addingham	53.9443°N 1.8840°W	SE07714980	Closed (Proposed extension)

The line runs through the countryside of the Yorkshire Dales in the county council area of North Yorkshire.

The railway has helped and supported the surrounding area (and local economy) to regenerate and provide brand new attractions, boosting both trade and tourism.

- Skipton platforms 5 & 6 (proposed). One of two long-term objectives (since 2000), the proposed northern terminus of the line to interchange with passenger train services on the nearby Airedale Line.

Haw Bank Tunnel. The 220 yards (200 m) long railway tunnel, located en-route between Skipton station and Embsay Junction.

Embsay Junction. Located close to Embsay station and connects to the Rylstone line (section of the former Grassington Branch).

- Embsay. Re-opened in 1981, restored to its former LMS condition. The current terminus of the line. Facilities include booking office, waiting room, toilets and souvenir shop.
- Draughton (proposed). In the old days of the Midland (later LMS) Railway, there were once plans to build a little halt called Draughton, at the siding, "marking where it was to be built but never had".
- Holywell. Opened in 1987 to view Craven Fault.

Stoneacre. Former run-round loop en route along the line, now used as a passing loop for use during two train operation.

- Bolton Abbey. Current terminus of the line. Facilities include booking office, waiting room, toilets, a souvenir shop and tearoom. The station building is a replica of the design which existed here when open to trains to Ilkey.
- Addingham (proposed). One of two long-term objectives. The original railway station and goods site have long since been demolished and redeveloped, although the trackbed between Bolton Abbey and Addingham still exists.

== Railcar ==
Origin	Number/Name	Class	Notes	Photograph
NER	3170	1903 Petrol Electric Autocar	A new powertrain has been installed and tested successfully on the Great Central Railway (preserved). The autocar's restoration has been completed and is available for traffic.	
