= Addingham railway station =

Railway station in West Yorkshire, England

Addingham
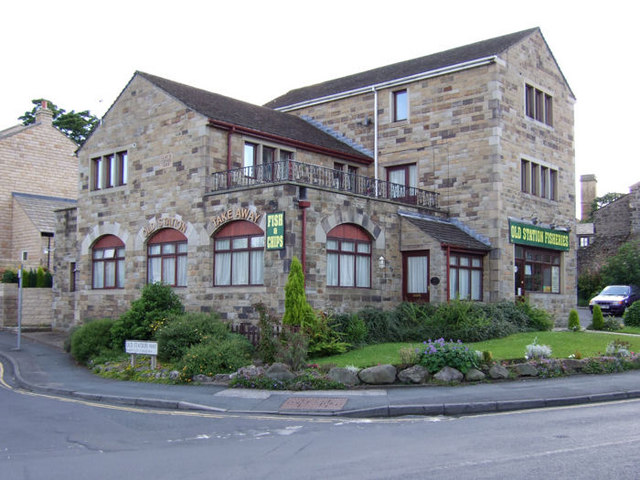
- The site of Addingham railway station, now Old Station Fisheries.

General information
- Location: Addingham, City of Bradford; England
- Coordinates: 53.9438°N 1.8836°W
- Grid reference: SE077497
- Platforms: 2

Other information
- Status: Disused

History
- Pre-grouping: Midland Railway
- Post-grouping: London, Midland and Scottish Railway

Key dates
- 16 May 1888: Opened
- 22 March 1965: Closed to passengers
- 5 July 1965: Closed to goods
Location

Addingham railway station was on the Midland Railway route from Skipton to Ilkley. It served the village of Addingham in West Yorkshire, England.

== History ==
Opened by the Midland Railway in 1888 as part of the Skipton to Ilkley line, it became part of the London, Midland and Scottish Railway during the Grouping of 1923. Passing on to the Eastern Region of British Railways on nationalisation in 1948, it was then closed by the British Railways Board as part of the Beeching Axe in March 1965. It was demolished several years later and the site is now a housing estate. The bridge and abutments have also been demolished, but an embankment remains.

== Preservation ==
There are plans to extend the Embsay and Bolton Abbey Steam Railway back to Addingham to a replica LMS-style station on the embankment, near the original station site, on a rebuilt bridge abutment.

The picture showing Addingham Station Fisheries is where the railway bridge crossed Addingham Main Street. The actual Addingham station was about 200 yards (180 m) further up the road, on the left-hand side. Although houses have now been built over the site of the station, the original goods yard is still used as an entrance drive to the houses built there and some of the old boundary walls still exist from the Victoria Terrace side.

Preceding station	Disused railways	Following station
Bolton Abbey	Midland Railway; Skipton to Ilkley Line	Ilkley
