= Addingham =

Village and civil parish in West Yorkshire, England

Coordinates: 53.9333°N 1.8833°W

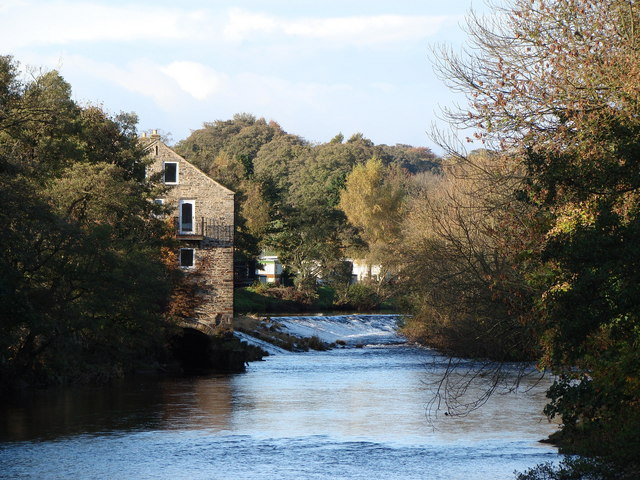
- High Mill at Addingham

- Location within West Yorkshire
- Population: 3,730 (2011 Census)
- OS grid reference: SE075495
  - London: 185 mi (298 km) SSE
- Civil parish: Addingham
- Metropolitan borough: City of Bradford
- Metropolitan county: West Yorkshire
- Region: Yorkshire and the Humber
- Country: England
- Sovereign state: United Kingdom
- Post town: ILKLEY
- Postcode district: LS29
- Dialling code: 01943
- Police: West Yorkshire
- Fire: West Yorkshire
- Ambulance: Yorkshire
- UK Parliament: Keighley and Ilkley

Addingham (formerly Haddincham c. 972, Odingehem 1086) is a village and civil parish in the City of Bradford in West Yorkshire, England. It is situated near the A65, 6 miles (10 km) south-east of Skipton, 3 miles (5 km) west of Ilkley, 12 miles (19 km) north-west of Bradford and around 20 miles (32 km) north-west of Leeds. Historically part of the West Riding of Yorkshire, it is located in the valley of the River Wharfe and is only 1 mile (2 km) from the Yorkshire Dales National Park. The name is thought to mean "homestead associated with a man called Adda", although in the Domesday Book, the village was referred to as "Ediham", which may have referred to Earl Edwin of Bolton Abbey. The 2001 census numbered Addingham's population at 3,599, increasing to 3,730 at the 2011 Census.

The area around Addingham is thought to have been populated from at least Bronze Age times, indicated by the 'cup and ring' carved stones that can be found on Addingham Moor. Its beginnings may date back to the late Mesolithic period, as evidenced by the scattered remains of early flint tools across Rombald's Moor to the south.

The earliest of the existing houses were built in the 17th century when the village was a farming community, but the real growth began in the late 18th century and early 19th century when the textile industry arrived and five working mills, plus other loomshops and weaving sheds, were established, and the village developed into a busy industrial community. The village grew up around three centres; Church Street in the east; The Green, about a mile away in the west; and the Old School in between. This is thought to be one of the reasons the village used to be known as "Long Addingham".

Since the decline of the textile industry during the 20th century, the village has now become largely a commuter and retirement community. It is home to an award-winning Medical Centre, a public park, four public houses, several retirement homes and a solitary school, Addingham Primary School.

== History ==
=== Early history ===
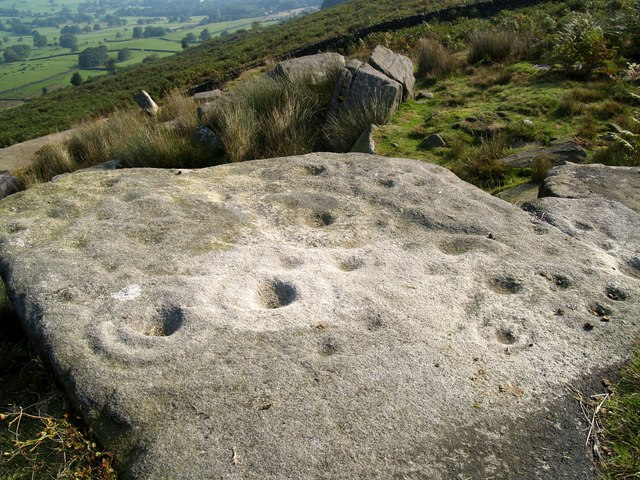
A Cup and Ring marked rock on top of Addingham Moor

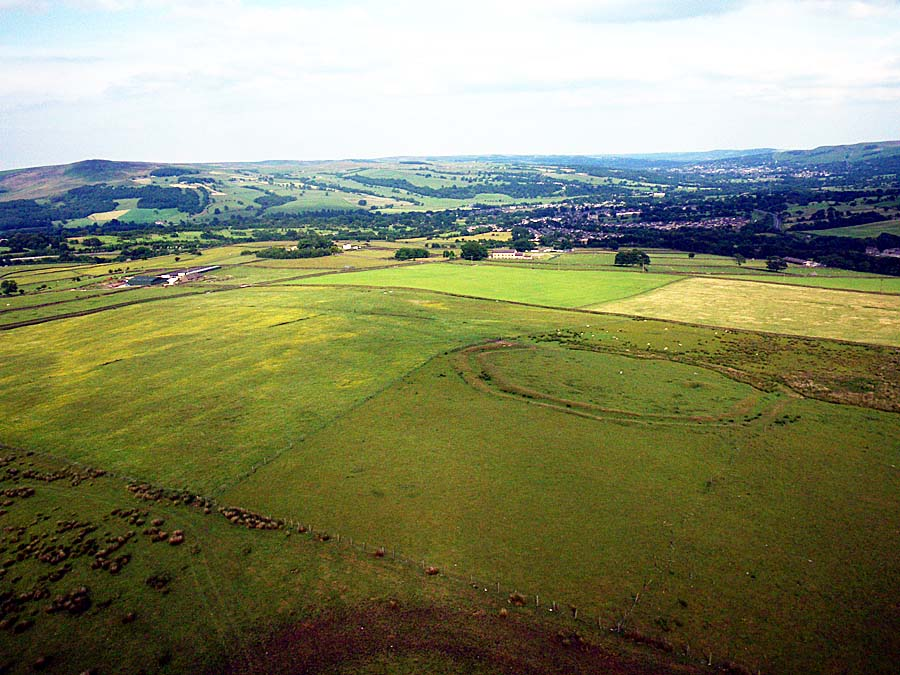
Kite aerial photo of Round Dykes Camp on Addingham Low Moor

There is evidence of civilisation around Addingham as far back as the late Mesolithic, Neolithic and early Bronze Ages, as indicated by the remains of early man in the form of flint tools on Rombald's Moor, which may date back to around 11,000 BC. The first 'fixed' artefacts are the 'cup and ring' marked stones, several of which can be found on top of Addingham Moor and Ilkley Moor to the east, which are thought to date back to the late Neolithic or early Bronze Age, around 1800 BC.

The first evidence of settlements come from the Iron Age – evidence of major tree clearance dating back to 700 BC has been found, as well as quern-stones on Addingham Moorside, which were shaped like small straw beehives and have hence been named 'beehive querns'. While a settlement on the Moorside has never been found, remains of an Iron Age settlement have been found on Addingham Low Moor, today known as Round Dikes. It has been suggested that Round Dikes, along with similar nearby sites Woofa Bank and Nesfield Scar, were summer encampments of the Romans. Little evidence truly remains of the 350 years of Roman occupation, save for the Roman road towards Skipton (now Moor Lane) which, up until the 1800s, was still the primary route between the two settlements.

It is thought that the Craven area, including what now constitutes Addingham, was settled by Anglo-Saxons around 612 AD following the defeat of the local Celtic tribe. Addingham is considered to be one of the earlier Anglo-Saxon settlements because of the ending – inghaem. It is likely that the village was an early Christian centre: Ecgfrith of Northumbria presented the lands in this area to St. Wilfrid in 678 AD, while a letter describing events taking place in 867 AD describes Archbishop Wulfhere of York residing in Addingham during the conflict between the Angles and Danes, which suggests there was already a church and a hall in the village – most likely at the site of St Peter's Church – in the 9th century AD.

=== Middle Ages ===
The Domesday Book in 1086 places the village in the region of Burghshire and refers to the village as "Ediham". The Lord in 1066 was Earl Edwin of Bolton Abbey ("Bodeltone"), who was Lord of several other surrounding settlements ranging as far west as Skipton, Hellifield and Anley, and may have given his name to the village.

The weir of a medieval corn mill that is located near modern-day High Mill has been dated back to 1315, and is one of the oldest medieval structures in the village. Despite this, the main occupation in the 1370s, when poll tax was levied, was agriculture, iron smelting and blacksmithing.

=== Early Modern Period: Reformation and early textile mills ===
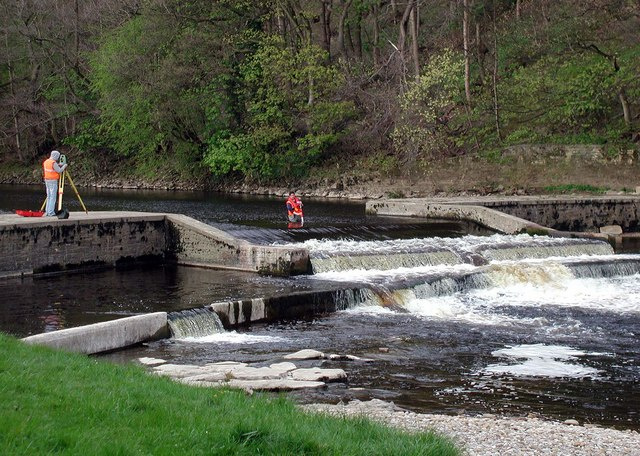
Weir at Low Mill

During the Reformation, Henry VIII dissolved the monastery in Bolton Abbey, and while most of Addingham accepted the Reformation, Richard Kirkman remained faithful to Catholicism and was subsequently arrested in 1578, tried, and executed in York alongside William Lacy. The Roman Catholic Church "Our Lady and of the English Martyrs", which was built in 1927 on Bolton Road, is dedicated to him and to other Catholics persecuted by Henry VIII.

During the English Civil War in 1642, Addingham was probably mainly Royalist, as several villagers are thought to have helped to defend Skipton Castle from the Parliamentarians.

The earliest indications of the textile industry in the village can be found in the will of William Atkinson in 1568, in which it states that he left a solitary loom to his son-in-law. The cloth making industry remained stagnant, however, until the 18th century, when revolutionary weaving inventions such as John Kay's Flying shuttle and, later, water-powered machines such as Crompton's Spinning mule, allowed the textile industry in Addingham to leap forward as it entered the 19th century.

John Cunliffe, a cloth manufacturer, and John Cockshott, a glazier and woolstapler, took advantage of the new developments in technology and leased land on the side of the River Wharfe in 1787 at the site now known as Low Mill. They built a spinning mill which enabled yarn to be spun more quickly than by hand and thus increased the production of cloth. A weir was constructed on the river and a wheel installed to provide the power. It was the first successful worsted mill in the world.

=== 19th century: Thriving textile industry ===
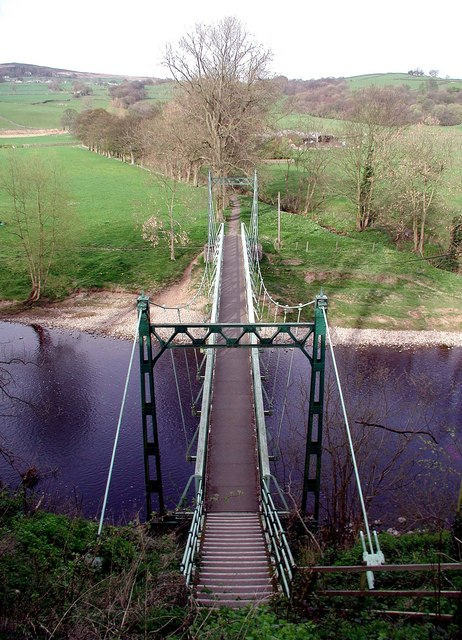
Suspension bridge crossing the River Wharfe near West Hall, Addingham. The current structure replaced the original 1895 bridge which was washed away in a flood in 1935.

The start of the 19th century saw the textile industry begin to thrive in the village – existing mills, such as the one at High Mill which had been built in 1787 to produce corn, were converted and extended and used for linen, cotton, worsted and finally silk spinning, while other new mills were built, such as Town Head Mill and Fentimans, the latter of which was built in 1802 originally to spin cotton and was later converted into a sawmill in the 1860s. Several small workshops were also built, as well as three-storey high workers' houses, in which the lower two floors would be for domestic use, and the top floor would house the looms, with inter-connecting doors along the row of houses. These buildings still exist today, and examples can be seen on Stockinger Lane.

In 1826, Low Mill, now under the tenancy of Jeremiah Horsfall, was the scene of a Luddite uprising.

In the census reports between 1831 and 1861, it was reported that there was a dramatic decline in the population of the village, and the 1841 census stated that this was due to the closure of Low Mill. In the 1851 census, so many of the houses at Low Mill were reported as empty that it is assumed that the mill remained closed until then. By 1861, hand loom weavers had practically disappeared. However, shortly afterwards, Samuel Cunliffe Lister re-opened Low Mill, with commercial operations being handled at Piece Hall at 19 Main Street.

In 1875, the Lord of the Manor, Richard Smith of London, proposed the construction of 20 streets, each with 40 to 50 houses. Small shops lined the Main Street, such as grocers, greengrocers and butchers. An Addingham co-operative society was formed; it prospered sufficiently to buy land on Bolton Road and build new premises and a row of cottages. The old ferry which brought parishioners from Beamsley was replaced by a foot bridge, and around about the same time a horse-drawn bus service to Ilkley was introduced.

By the end of the 19th century, there were five operating mills in the village, three of them owned by Lister, and the village was thriving again.

=== 20th century: Second World War and industrial decline ===
The village continued to produce textiles until the start of the First World War, and despite high levels of production during the war, the textile industry never really recovered. However, after the bombing of the SU Carburetter factory in Coventry during the Second World War in 1941, production switched to Addingham, at which time up to 1,000 people worked there and prefabricated homes were erected in Ilkley to cater for the sudden increase in employees. The other textiles factories were busy during the war, and the Listers, having produced silk between wars with a German company, were able to use their expertise to produce silk parachutes.

After the war, Carburetter production ceased and Low Mill returned to textiles. For a short time the mills were working hard, as textiles were in short supply. However, the machinery was out of date, and there was a major closure of textile mills throughout the country. In Addingham, the last mill to close was at Low Mill in 1976.

In the meantime, the demand for small, cheap housing increased, and this saw new council houses being built at Moor Lane after the First World War, and at School Lane, Burns Hill and Green Lane after the Second World War. After the closure of the railway line in 1969, a modern housing estate was built where the line used to run, and has since been expanded.

In 1998, textiles briefly returned to Addingham and Low Mill in the form of a Norwegian-based company, Straum (UK), who started production of scoured wool, but this business closed in 2002.

Today, the village is mainly a retirement and commuter community, with several people commuting every day to nearby towns such as Skipton and Ilkley and also to larger cities like Leeds and Bradford.

== Governance ==
The lowest form of governance is the parish council, which was formed in 1894, when the village was part of the Skipton Rural District. In 1974, as part of the Local Government Act 1972, the village was redistributed to become part of the Bradford Metropolitan District Council. The council comprises 11 members, with elections held every four years to coincide with the year's District Council elections.

The village is part of the Craven ward of the Metropolitan borough of the City of Bradford, part of the Metropolitan county of West Yorkshire.

Addingham is part of the Keighley UK Parliament constituency, represented by Robbie Moore of the Conservatives since the 2019 general election. The constituency was previously represented by John Grogan (Labour 2017–2019), Kris Hopkins (Conservative, 2010–2017), and before that by Ann Cryer (Labour, 1997–2010). Like Ilkley, Addingham is a Conservative majority, which contrasts to the Labour voting area in Keighley.

== Demographics ==
Addingham compared
2001 UK Census	Addingham	Bradford (borough)	England
Total Population	3,599	467,665	49,138,831
Over 75 Years Old	351 (9.75%)	31,560 (6.75%)	3,705,159 (7.54%)
Unemployed	51 (1.42%)	14,281 (3.05%)	1,188,855 (2.42%)
% White Ethnicity	99.15%	78.27%	90.92%

According to the 2001 census, Addingham had a population of 3,599 living in 1,645 households. Of the 2,997 people aged 16 or over, 2,052 were either married or living with a partner, 587 were single and 544 were divorced or widowed. The mean age of the village was 44.42. Of the 1,645 households, 1,631 heads of houses were of white ethnicity, suggesting that around 99.15% of the village is of white ethnicity, a high figure compared to the rest of the Bradford district. The average distance to work is 19.69 km, confirming Addingham's status as a commuter village.

=== Population change ===
As the data below suggests, the closure of the majority of the mills between 1831 and 1851 affected the population of the village, with the population dropping by around 600 in 20 years. In 1861 and again in 1881, it is assumed that the population began to grow again due to the re-opening of Low Mill.

Population Change in Addingham, 1801–2001
1801	1811	1821	1831	1841	1851	1861	1871	1881	1891	1901	1911	1921	1931	1941	1951	1961	1971	1981	1991	2001
1,157	1,471	1,570	2,179	1,753	1,558	1,859	1,838	2,163	2,225	2,144	1,987	1,923	2,005	no data	1,873	1,763	2,065	2,600	2,965	3,599

== Economy ==
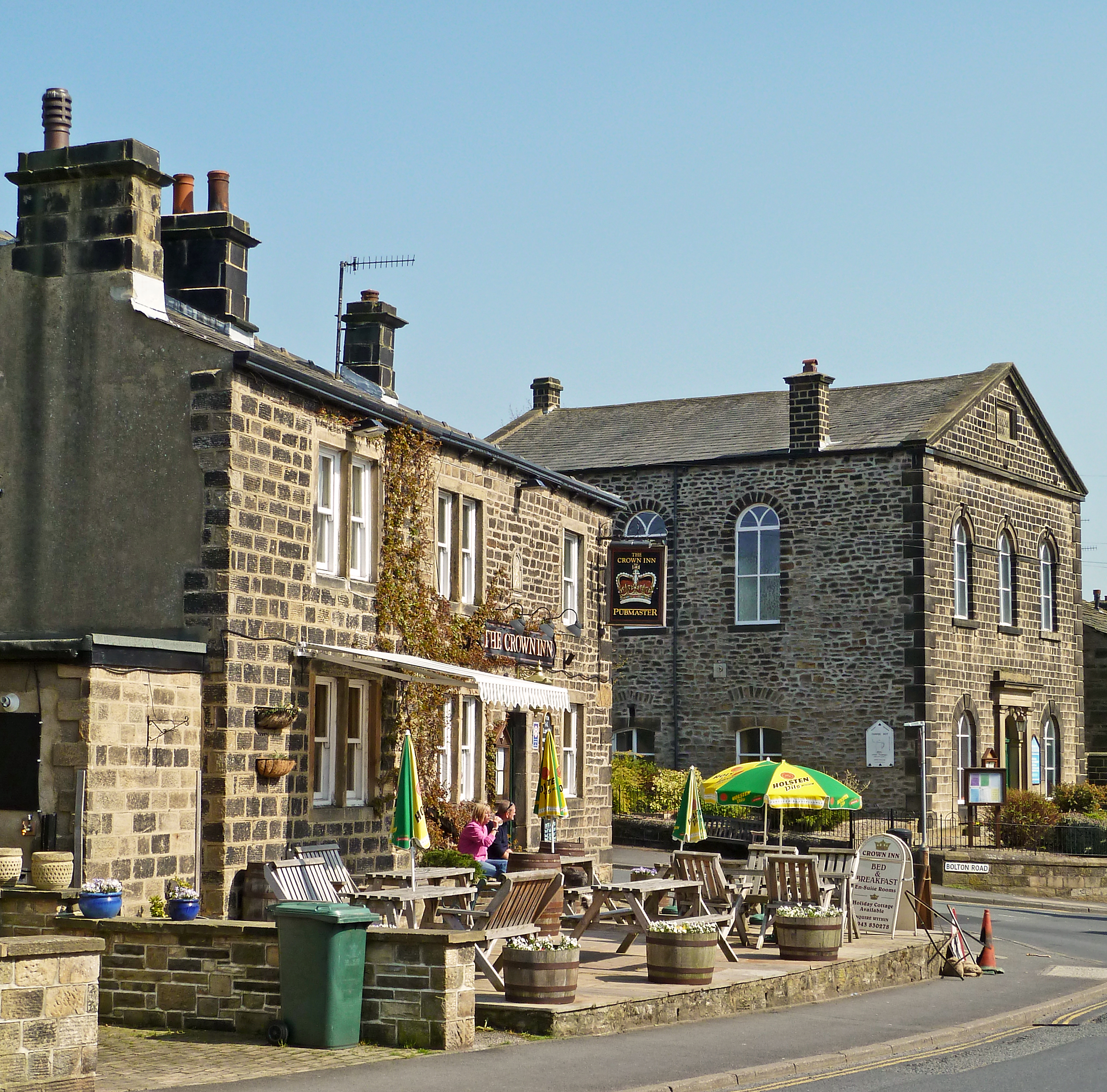
The Crown Inn, located on the intersection between Main Street and Bolton Road

The village relies heavily on local businesses to support the economy, and such businesses provide an array of services, including property services, butchery, carpentry, driving schools and electrical repairs. However, due to the economic climate of recent times, and not helped by the arrival of the Co-op supermarket in 2013, many local businesses have been forced to shut down, prompting the Parish Council to set up a sub-committee, with the purpose of finding new ways to promote local businesses not only around the village but further afield.

== Transport ==
Addingham once had its own railway station, but this closed in 1965. It has been suggested that the Embsay and Bolton Abbey Steam Railway could be extended back to the village and a new LMS Style station could be built on the surviving embankment, a few metres from the old original station site which has now long been redeveloped as housing. Addingham has a half-hourly bus service to Ilkley and Keighley, hourly to Leeds and Skipton, and infrequently between Ilkley and Grassington in the Yorkshire Dales. Night-time and Sunday buses are restricted to an hourly service between Ilkley and Keighley.

The nearest railway station is in Ilkley, with regular services to Leeds and Bradford.

There was a public inquiry on 28 October 1986 for the A65 bypass. Work started around July 1989. The bypass was opened on 17 October 1990 by Christopher Chope.

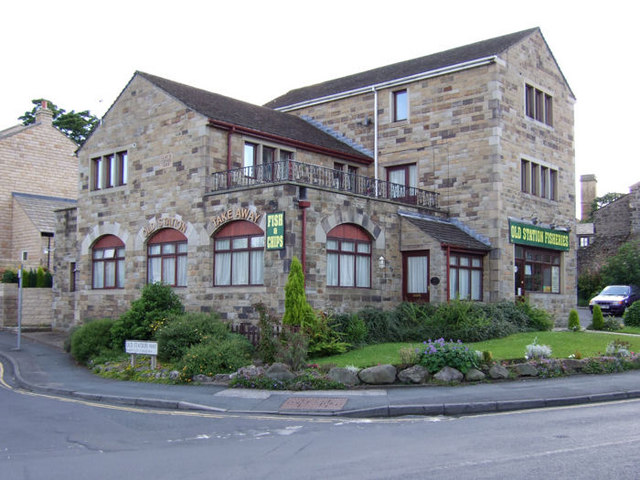
The Old Station Fisheries, which stands close to the site of the old railway station

== Public services ==
A new Medical Centre in the village was officially opened on 14 August 2009, having been the culmination of many years of battling for a purpose-built surgery to serve local patients. It has replaced the previous centre situated further along the main road. In March 2011, the new centre was awarded a Royal College of General Practitioners' Quality Practice Award (QPA) for the highest standard of patient care.

Addingham has a public library on Main Street, which used to be the site of the local school. In February 2011, Bradford Council outlined a money-saving scheme in which five of the areas most under-used libraries, in Addingham, Denholme, Heaton, Wilsden and Wrose, would be closed. However, parish councillors urged Bradford Council to delay the closure until a takeover could be organised. In November 2011, the library became the first in the area to be fully staffed by community volunteers, and the library is now open for over twice the number of hours it was whilst run by Bradford Council.

== Education ==
The Old School was built in 1669 by Anthony Ward. The school started as a single-storey two-roomed cottage but another storey was added in 1805 when the school moved into the upper room. The school remained as it was until 1845 when it was replaced by the Church of England school (the 'Low School' in North Street in 1845).

In 1874, on Chapel Street, the Wesleyans built a day school which in turn became the National School in 1891. This remained as the infant and junior school until the building of the First School and Middle schools in the 1960s.

The First School, closed when the two-tier education system was introduced in 2000, was demolished in 2001. The Middle School then became Addingham Primary School which has around 240 pupils.

== Culture, media and sport ==
=== Gala ===
Since at least 1960, Addingham has held a village gala in July. It includes a parade, which begins at Green Lane proceeds down Main Street, culminating at the village park, and several attractions including rides and stalls. Each year, there is a different theme for the Gala. In 2010, a traditional fell race organised by Ilkley Harriers, which had not taken place for over 20 years, was reinstated to the agenda.

=== Pantomime ===
For several years, the pantomime was funded, organised and run by Friends of Addingham Primary School (FAPS), but in 2003, the organisation felt unable to commit the time to organise the project and decided to discontinue its support of the project. This led to the formation of the Addingham Pantomime Group, which has staged the pantomime every February ever since.

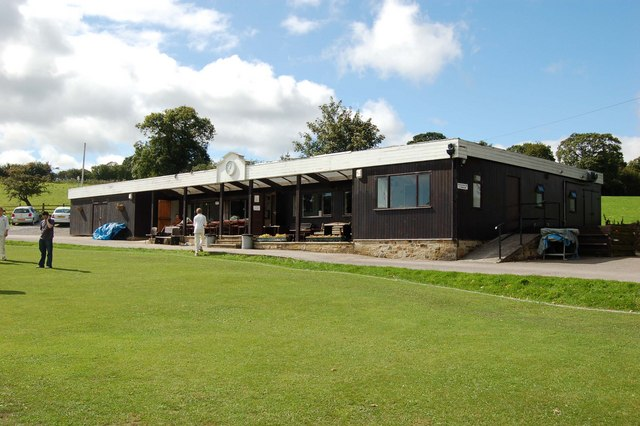
Addingham Cricket Club

Since 2009, the pantomime has entered the Wharfedale Festival of Theatre. In their debut year in the competition, they won seven awards, including the Pantomime Cup for Best Pantomime.

=== Sport ===
Addingham has many sports teams including a football team previously part of the Harrogate and District League. A decision was made before the start of the 2010–11 season to transfer to the Craven and District League due to the closer proximity of most of the teams. In their inaugural season in the league, they finished 10th in Division 4.

Addingham Cricket Club plays in the Aire-Wharfe Senior Cricket League.

Addingham has many trails for mountain bikers in the surrounding hills.

On 5 July 2014, the Tour de France Stage 1 from Leeds to Harrogate passed through the village. On 6 July 2014, Stage 2 of the 2014 Tour de France from York to Sheffield, passed through the village.

== Future ==
=== Low Mill ===
Work is under way to convert Low Mill into a residential complex. The development will consist of 32 units in the mill building and 22 new houses and 6 apartments. 17 of the units will be reserved for local buyers at affordable prices. The conversion will increase the height of the mill as well as the removal of surrounding buildings to be landscaped.

=== Motel ===
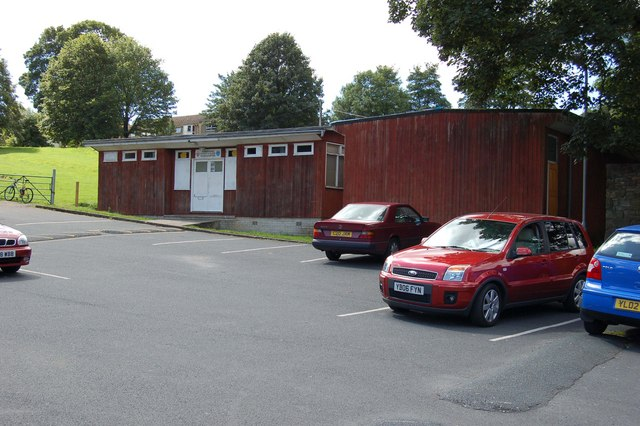
Addingham Scout Hut, which was demolished to make room for the Medical Centre which has now been built

Planning permission for a motel to be built on an overgrown plot of land near the cricket ground on Main Street was first granted in 1991 and renewed in 1996. In 2001, an application to redevelop the land into nine houses was rejected due to the site being part of a Green Belt site, leading to renewed efforts on a 32-bedroom "budget" motel. In 2005, revised plans for an 'American-style' 30-bedroom motel with less car parking space and a residents only bar were approved, with the Parish Council objecting on the grounds that the new design would be out of character for the village. In 2007, after no visible work had been done, the Parish Council were awarded a £4,000 grant and were able to clean it up and erect a new fence. By 2008, it had once again become overgrown, leading to Parish Councillors urging the Bradford Council to release the site from the Green Belt. In 2010, another bid was made to renew planning permission for a 30-bedroom motel, with three written objections being made to Bradford Council. Since then, no development has commenced on this plot of land and the issue is still to be resolved.

=== Recreational facilities ===
In the process of building the Medical Centre, the existing Scout Hut was demolished. The Parish Council were granted permission to refurbish the site of the present football pavilion. The Parish Council have been working together with the Scouting Organisation and Addingham Football Club on a new scheme to upgrade the facilities for the football club while providing a new home for the Scout Troop, including a potential £85,000 all-weather multi-purpose pitch. In February 2012, plans for the extension of the football pavilion were approved by Bradford Council. The Multipurpose Games Area (also known as MUGA to the residents) was opened in July 2013.

== See also ==
- Skipton
- Yorkshire Dales National Park
- City of Bradford
- Ilkley
- Listed buildings in Addingham
