= Bolton Abbey railway station =

Railway station in North Yorkshire, England

Bolton Abbey
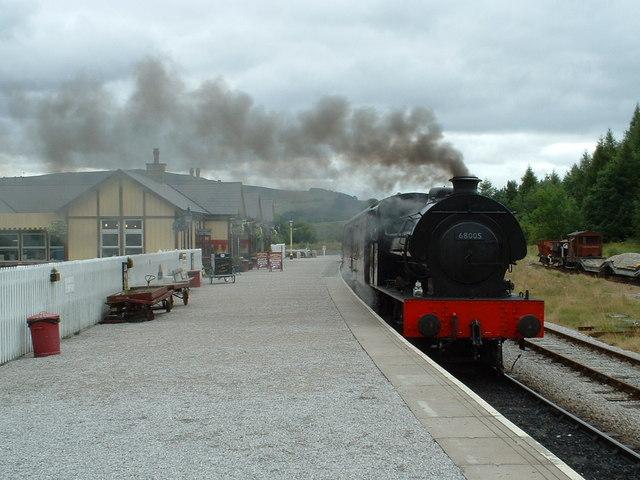
- Bolton Abbey station

General information
- Location: Bolton Abbey, North Yorkshire; England
- Coordinates: 53.976200°N 1.908643°W
- Grid reference: SE060533
- System: Station on heritage railway
- Operator: Embsay and Bolton Abbey Steam Railway
- Platforms: 1 (originally 2)

History
- Original company: Midland Railway
- Post-grouping: London, Midland and Scottish Railway

Key dates
- 16 May 1888: Opened
- 17 June 1940: Closed
- 17 March 1941: Reopened
- 22 March 1965: Closed
- 1 May 1998: Reopened
Location

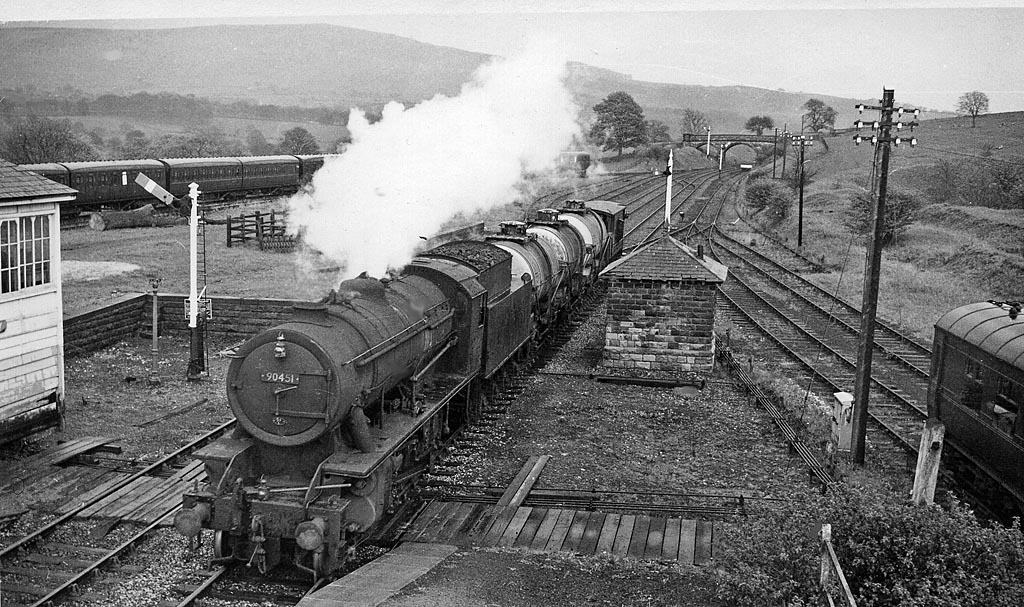
Bolton Abbey Station with a Down train of tank wagons in 1961

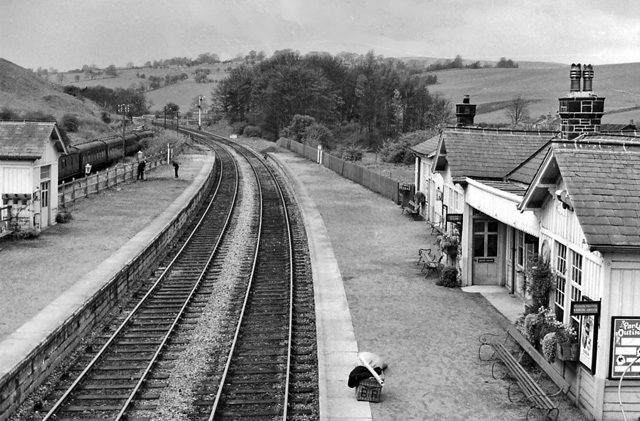
View NW, towards Skipton; ex-Midland Leeds - Ilkley - Skipton line in 1961

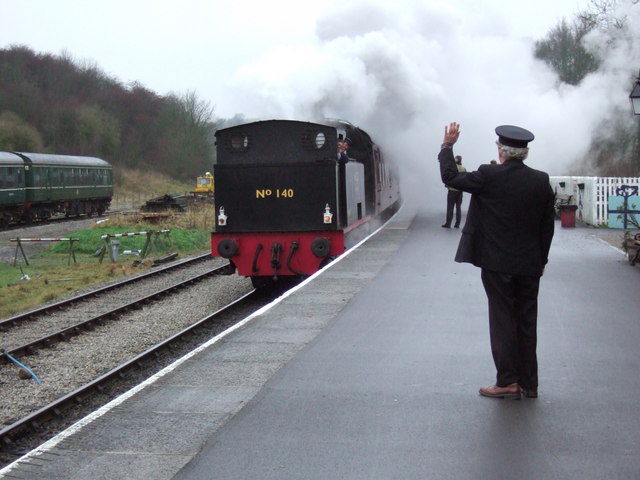
Mince Pie Special No.140 arriving at Bolton Abbey Station with a 'Mince Pie Special' on Boxing Day 2006.

Bolton Abbey railway station is on the Embsay and Bolton Abbey Steam Railway. It serves Bolton Abbey, although it is closer to Bolton Bridge, in North Yorkshire, England and several countryside walking routes. The station is the current terminus of the steam railway.

== History ==
The station was opened in 1888 by the Midland Railway and was taken over by the London, Midland and Scottish Railway. Bolton Abbey station has had a long Royal connection, being the nearest station to the Duke of Devonshire's Bolton Hall. The hall was very popular with British monarchs such as:

- King Edward VII (visited in 1902)
- King George V (visited in 1922)

During the Second World War, an air-raid shelter was constructed for the Royal family in an air-raid. The last time the royal train came to Bolton Abbey was in 1947. It closed along with the line in March 1965 and the buildings soon became derelict. Following the purchase of the site and associated trackbed by the railway trust in 1995, the station was lovingly restored to its 1888 condition. It was officially re-opened on 1 May 1998 by Sir William McAlpine.

== Project plans ==
The station originally had two platforms and a footbridge throughout its heyday, but one of the platforms became disused and the footbridge has been dismantled since closure.

However, the E&BASR plans to reconstruct and restore the disused platform, possibly as an island platform which would include a platform 3, and also to rebuild the old station footbridge in order to link both platforms together again. This would return Bolton Abbey station to its former state in the days of the LMS (and BR London Midland Region), especially to how it was right up until the line's closure many years before.

This is all part of the E&BASR's expansion plan(s) to extend the line back down to as far as Addingham (where a replica LMS style, temporary replacement station, will be built, as part of the proposed project).

== Information ==
The Holywell Halt site is 1.5 miles away from Bolton Abbey. The station includes:

- A ticket office
- A gift shop
- A coffee shop
- A car park
- Walking routes

== See also ==
- Addingham
- Embsay
- Holywell Halt
- Stoneacre Loop

Preceding station	Heritage railways	Following station
Holywell Halt	Embsay and Bolton Abbey Steam Railway	Terminus
	Disused railways	
Embsay	Midland Railway; Skipton to Ilkley Line	Addingham
