= Bolton Abbey =

Site of 12th century Augustinian monastery

Coordinates: 53°58′57″N 1°53′14″W

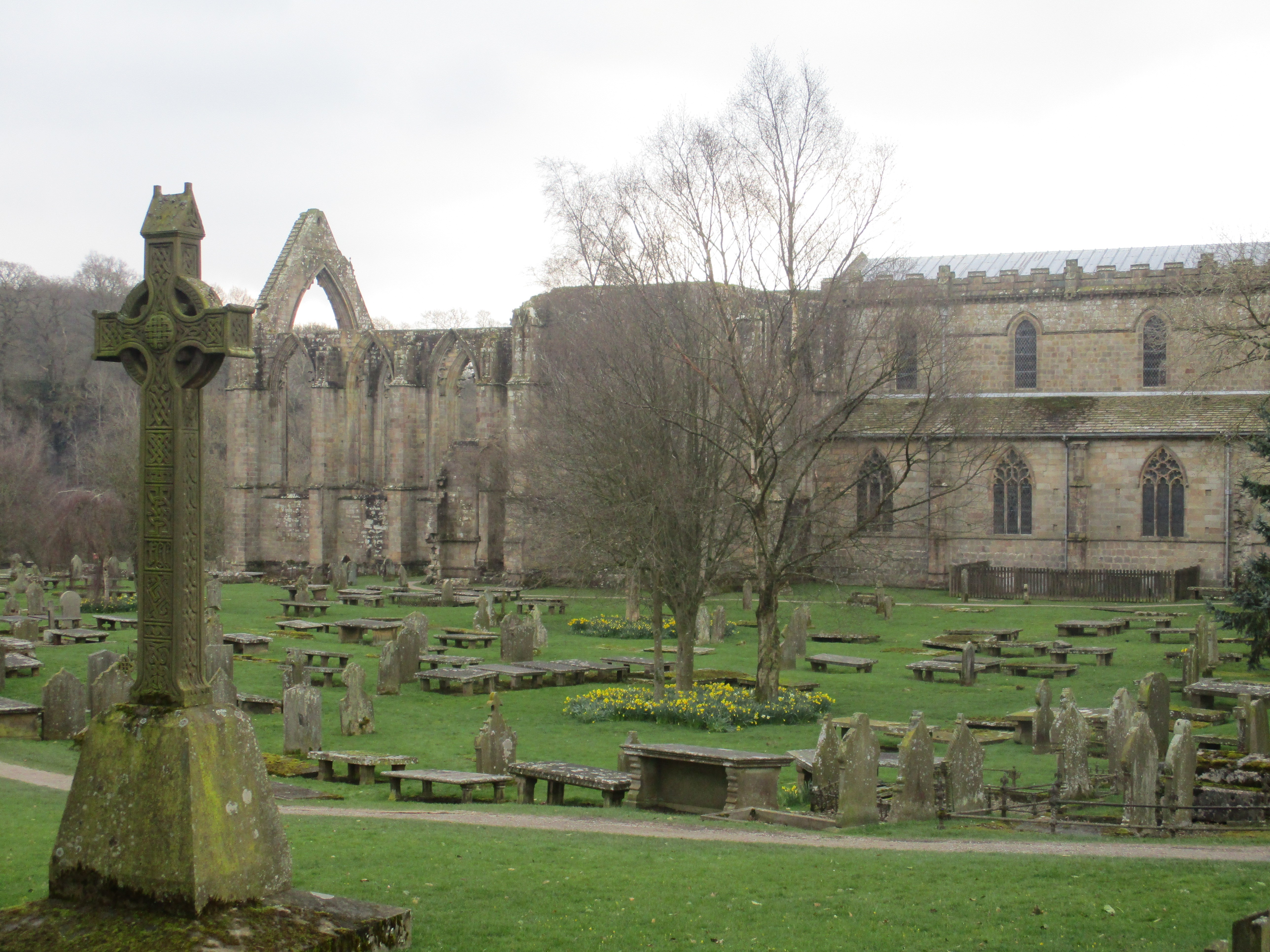
The graveyard by the Priory

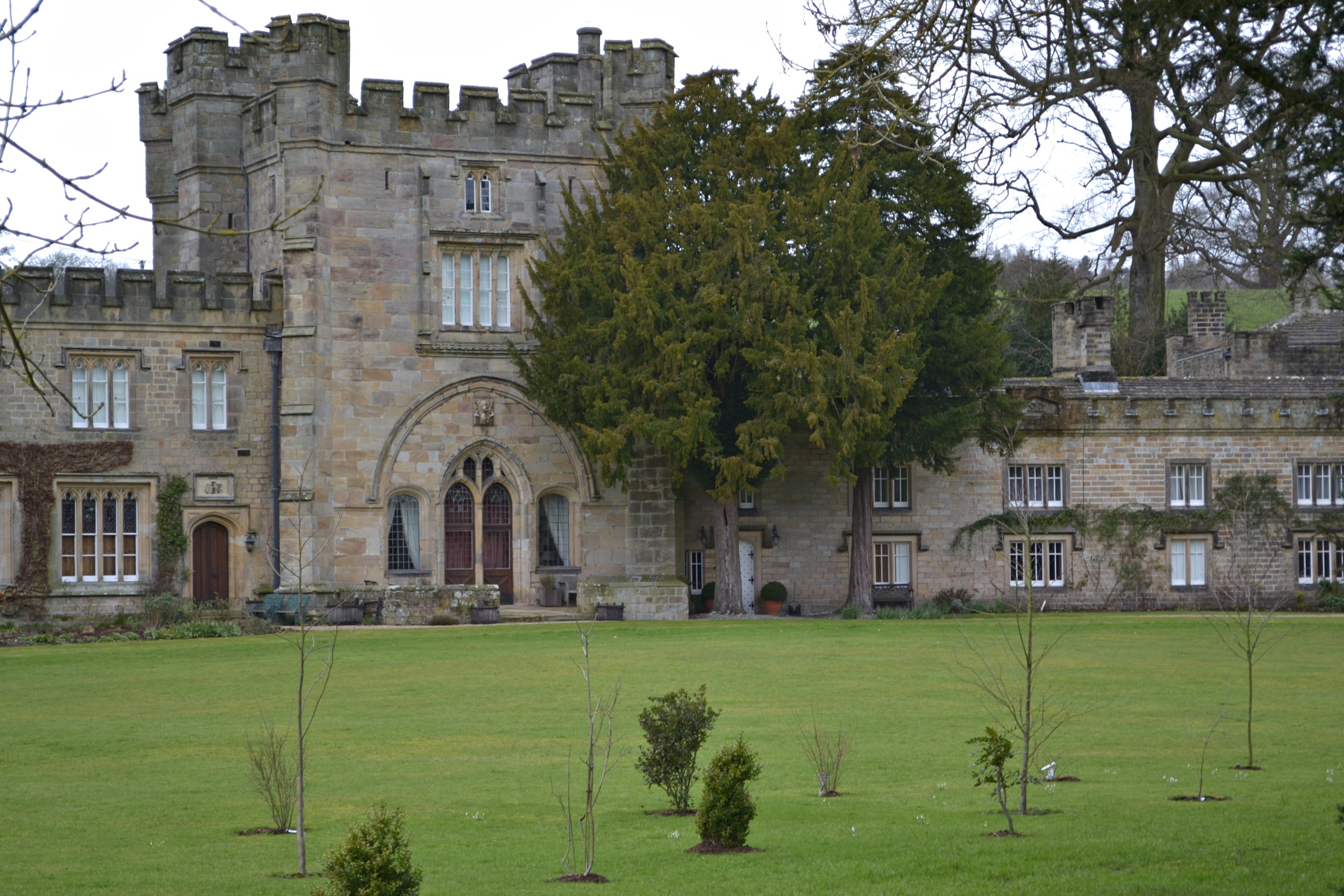
Bolton Hall

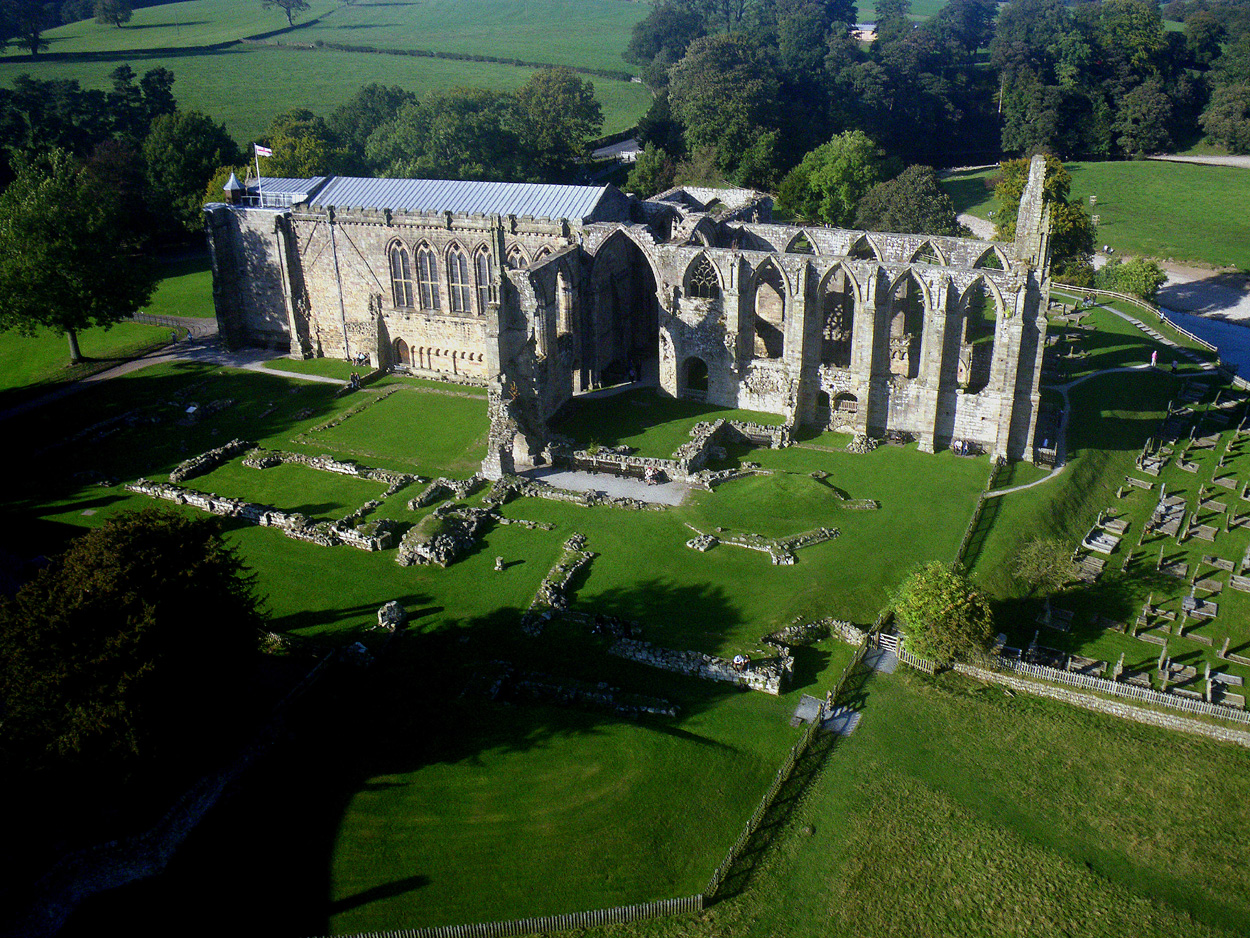
Kite aerial photo of Bolton Priory

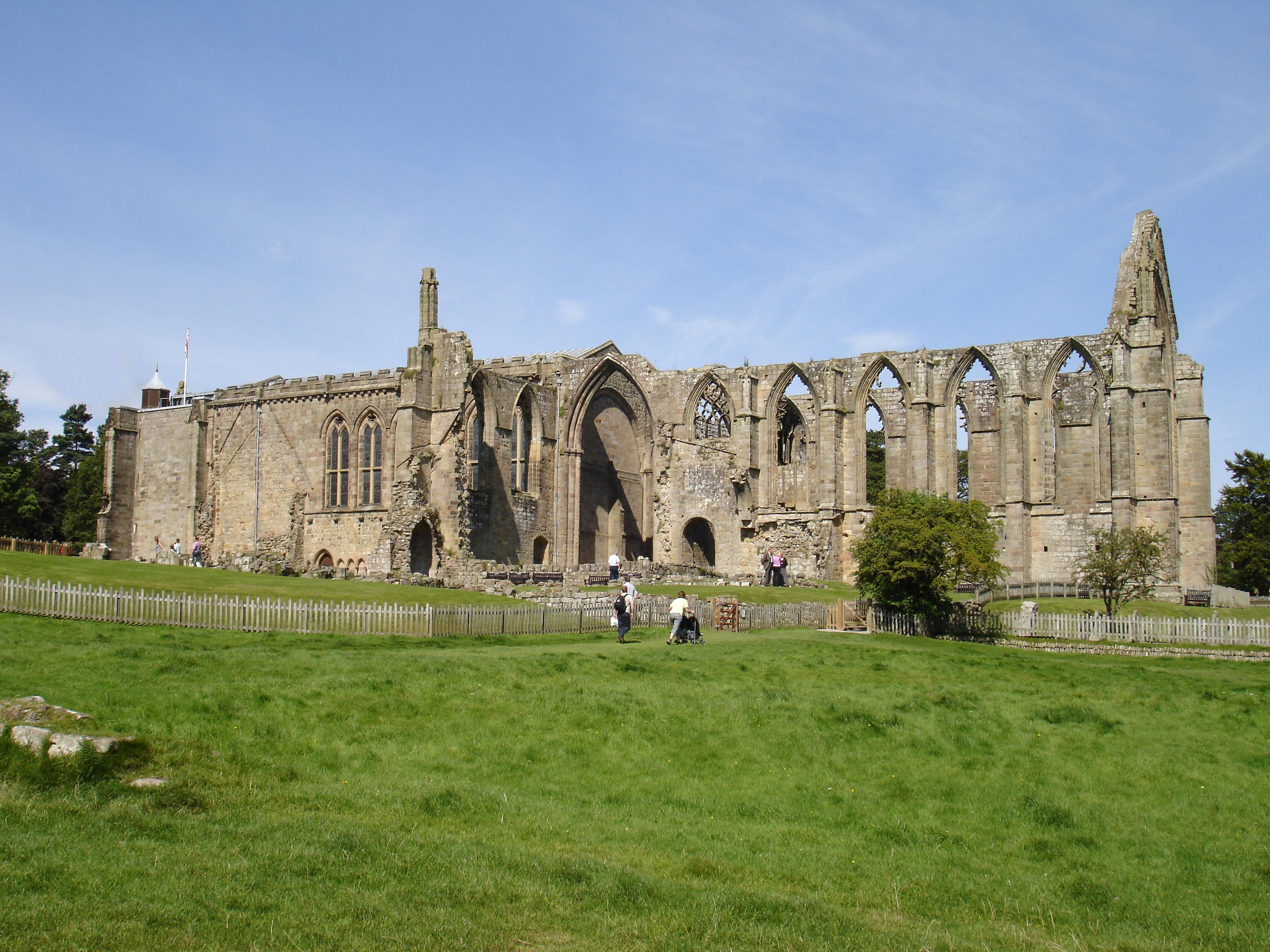
Bolton Priory

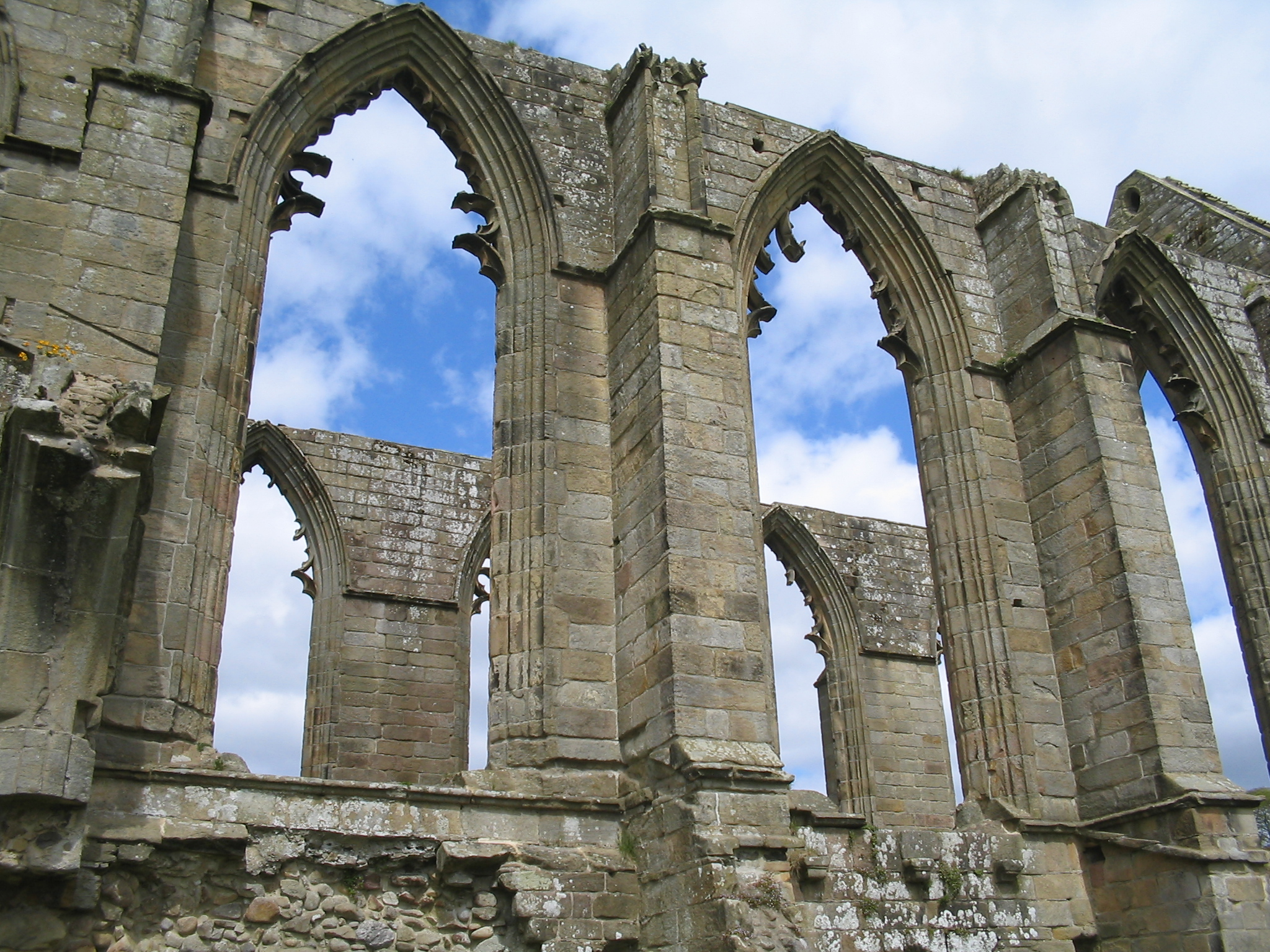
Bolton Priory windows

Bolton Abbey Estate in Wharfedale, North Yorkshire, England, takes its name from a 12th-century Augustinian monastery of canons regular, technically a priory, which was closed in the 1539 Dissolution of the Monasteries ordered by King Henry VIII. It is in the Yorkshire Dales, next to the village of Bolton Abbey. The estate belongs to the Duke of Devonshire.

Most of the abbey is now ruins, but the large gatehouse and adjoining parts have been converted and extended into a substantial country house, Bolton Abbey Hall. The medieval church remains in use as a parish church, and is known as Bolton Priory.

The estate is open to visitors, and includes many miles of all-weather walking routes. The Embsay & Bolton Abbey Steam Railway terminates at Bolton Abbey station 1.5 miles (2.4 km) from Bolton Priory.

== Bolton Priory ==
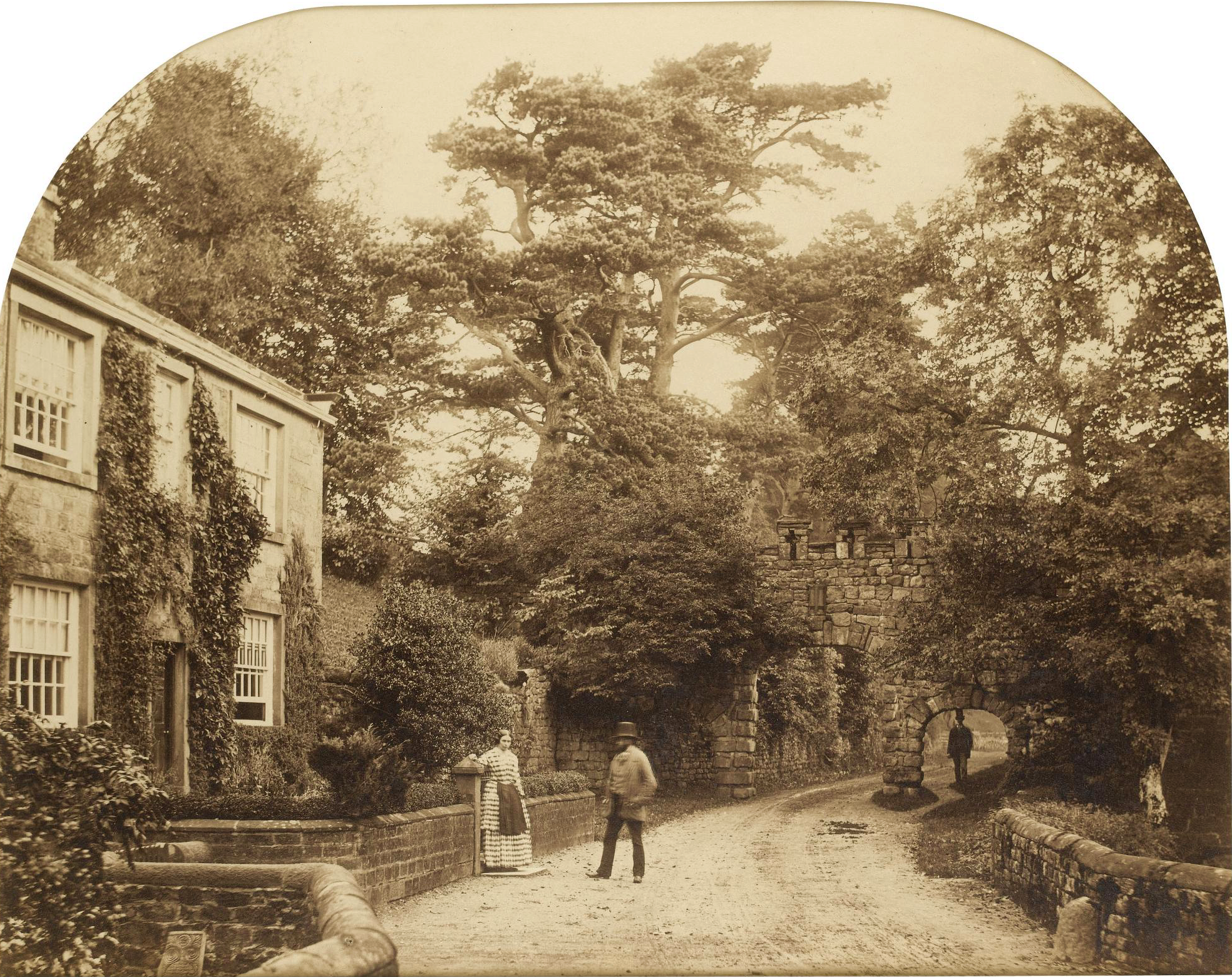
1850s Albumen print by Roger Fenton

The monastery was founded at Embsay in 1120. Led by a prior, Bolton Abbey was technically a priory, despite its name. It was founded in 1154 by the Augustinian order, on the banks of the River Wharfe. The land at Bolton, as well as other resources, were given to the order by Lady Alice de Romille of Skipton Castle in 1154. In the early 14th century Scottish raiders caused the temporary abandonment of the site and serious structural damage to the priory. The seal of the priory featured the Blessed Virgin Mary and the Child and the phrase sigillum sancte Marie de Bolton.

The nave of the abbey church was in use as a parish church from about 1170 onwards, and survived the Dissolution of the Monasteries.

Building work was still going on at the abbey when the Dissolution of the Monasteries resulted in the termination of the priory in January 1540. The east end remains in ruins. A tower, begun in 1520, was left half-standing, and its base was later given a bell-turret and converted into an entrance porch. Most of the remaining church is in the Gothic style of architecture, but more work was done in the Victorian era, including windows by August Pugin. It still functions as a church today, holding services on Sundays and religious holidays.

Bolton Abbey churchyard contains the war grave of a Royal Flying Corps officer of the First World War. The churchyard also has the grave of cricketer Fred Trueman.

== Bolton Abbey Estate ==
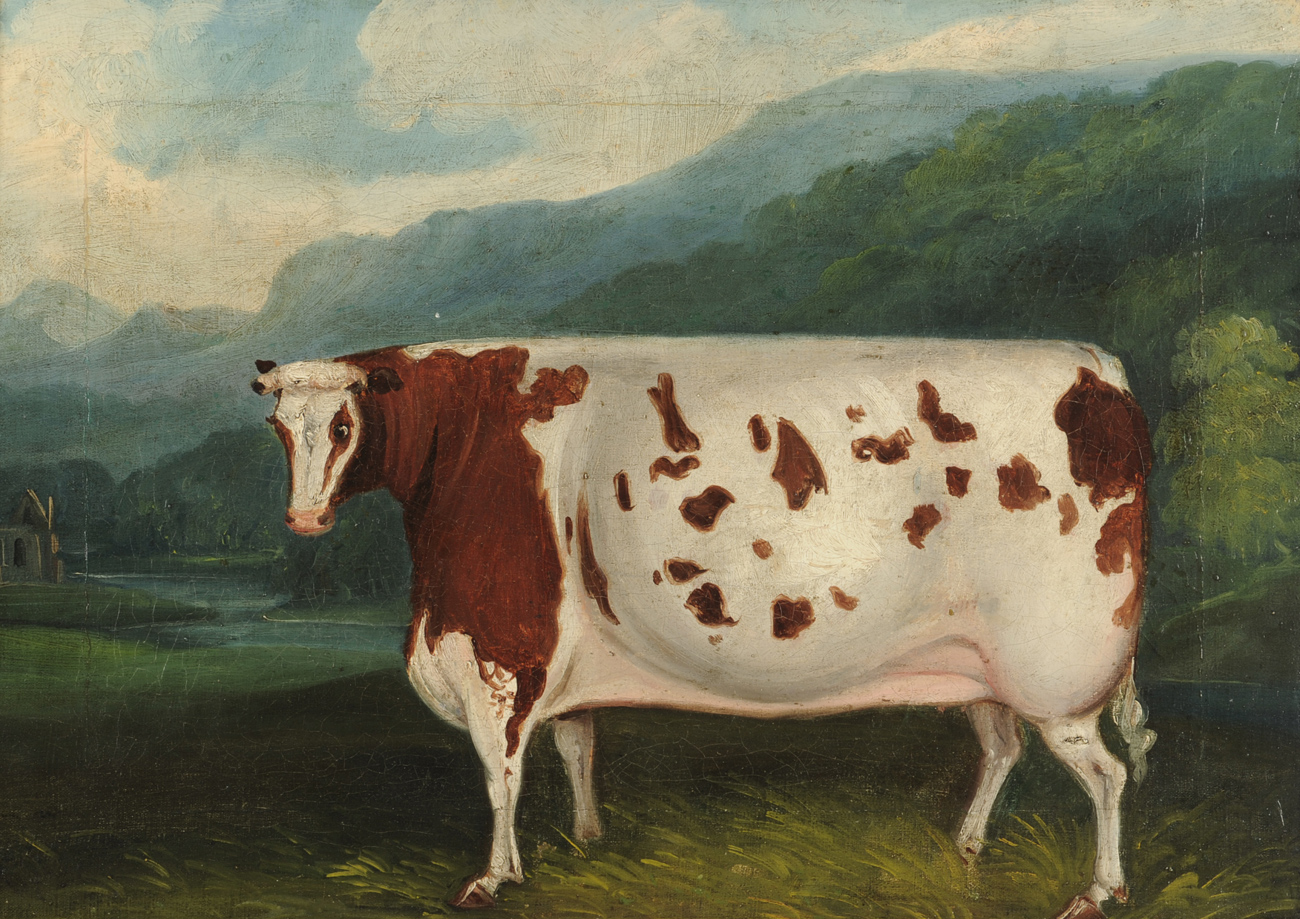
The Craven Heifer

The Domesday Book lists Bolton Abbey as the caput manor of a multiple estate including 77 carucates of ploughland (around 9240 acres/3850 ha) belonging to Edwin, Earl of Mercia. The estate then comprised Bolton Abbey, Halton East, Embsay, Draughton; Skibeden, Skipton, Low Snaygill, Thorlby; Addingham, Beamsley, Holme, Gargrave; Stainton, Otterburn, Scosthrop, Malham, Anley; Coniston Cold, Hellifield and Hanlith. They were all laid waste in the Harrying of the North after the defeat of the rebellion of Edwin, Earl of Mercia and classified as the Clamores (disputed land) of Yorkshire until around 1090, when they were transferred to Robert de Romille, who moved its administrative centre to Skipton Castle. The Romille line died out around 1310, and Edward II granted the estates to Robert Clifford.

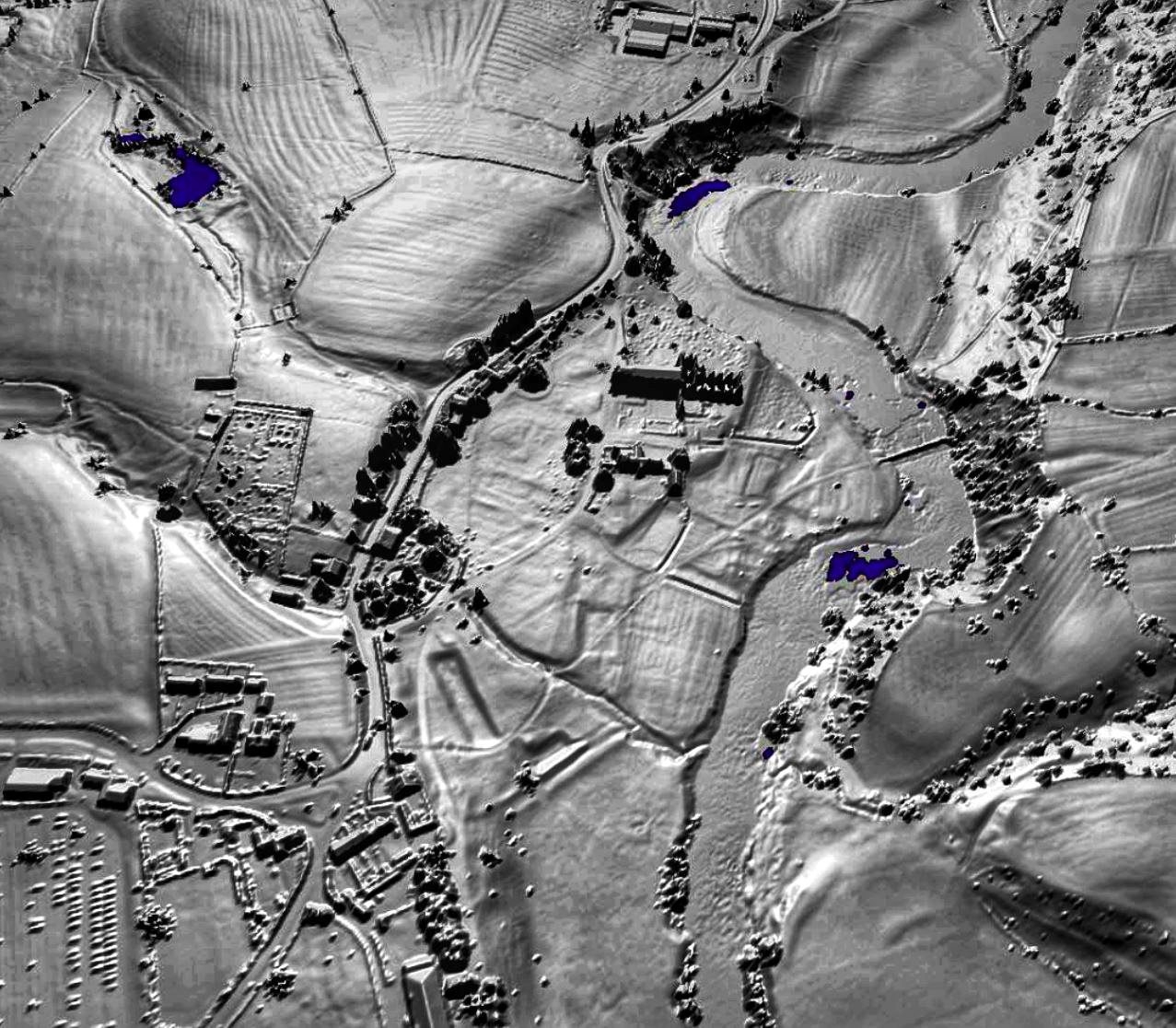
A lidar view of Bolton Priory and associated archaeological residues.

In 1748 Baroness Clifford married William Cavendish and Bolton Abbey Estate thereafter belonged to the Dukes of Devonshire, until a trust was set up by the 11th Duke of Devonshire turning it over to the Chatsworth Settlement Trustees to steward.

Today, the 33,000 acre (134 km^{2}) estate contains six areas designated as Sites of Special Scientific Interest, including Strid Wood, an ancient woodland (mainly oak), which contains the length of the River Wharfe known as The Strid, and a marine fossil quarry. The estate encompasses 8 miles (13 km) of river, 84 farms, 84 buildings of architectural interest, and four Grade I listed buildings; and is currently home to 27 businesses from tearooms to bookshops. The iconic stepping stones cross the River Wharfe near the Abbey ruins. The estate includes extensive grouse moors, including Barden Moor on the west side of Wharfedale and Barden Fell on the east side of the dale. There is also a pheasant shoot. Apart from people employed within these businesses, the estate employs about 120 staff to work on the upkeep of the estate. Much of the estate is open to the public. A charge is made for car parking.

The Dales Way passes through the estate on a permissive path. Barden Moor and Barden Fell, which includes the prominent crag of Simon's Seat, are on access land, and permissive paths, including a route called the Valley of Desolation, lead up to the moors. Access to the moors may be closed to the public during the shooting season.

Bolton Abbey Hall, originally the gatehouse of the priory, was converted into a house by the Cavendish family. The hall is a Grade II* listed building.

As well as Bolton Abbey, the Cavendish family also own the Chatsworth (Derbyshire, England) and Lismore Castle (Waterford, in the Republic of Ireland) estates.

In 1807, the famously large cow known as the Craven Heifer was bred on the estate.

== The Priory Church ==
The Priory Church of St. Mary and St. Cuthbert, Bolton Abbey, is an active Church of England church, serving the village and parish of Bolton Abbey, with a full calendar of liturgical events, and a full-time rector who lives in the adjacent Rectory. The current church is the surviving part of the otherwise ruined 12th-century Augustinian religious community originally known as Bolton. It is situated in the Yorkshire Dales National Park, within the Bolton Abbey estate.

== Bolton Abbey in culture ==
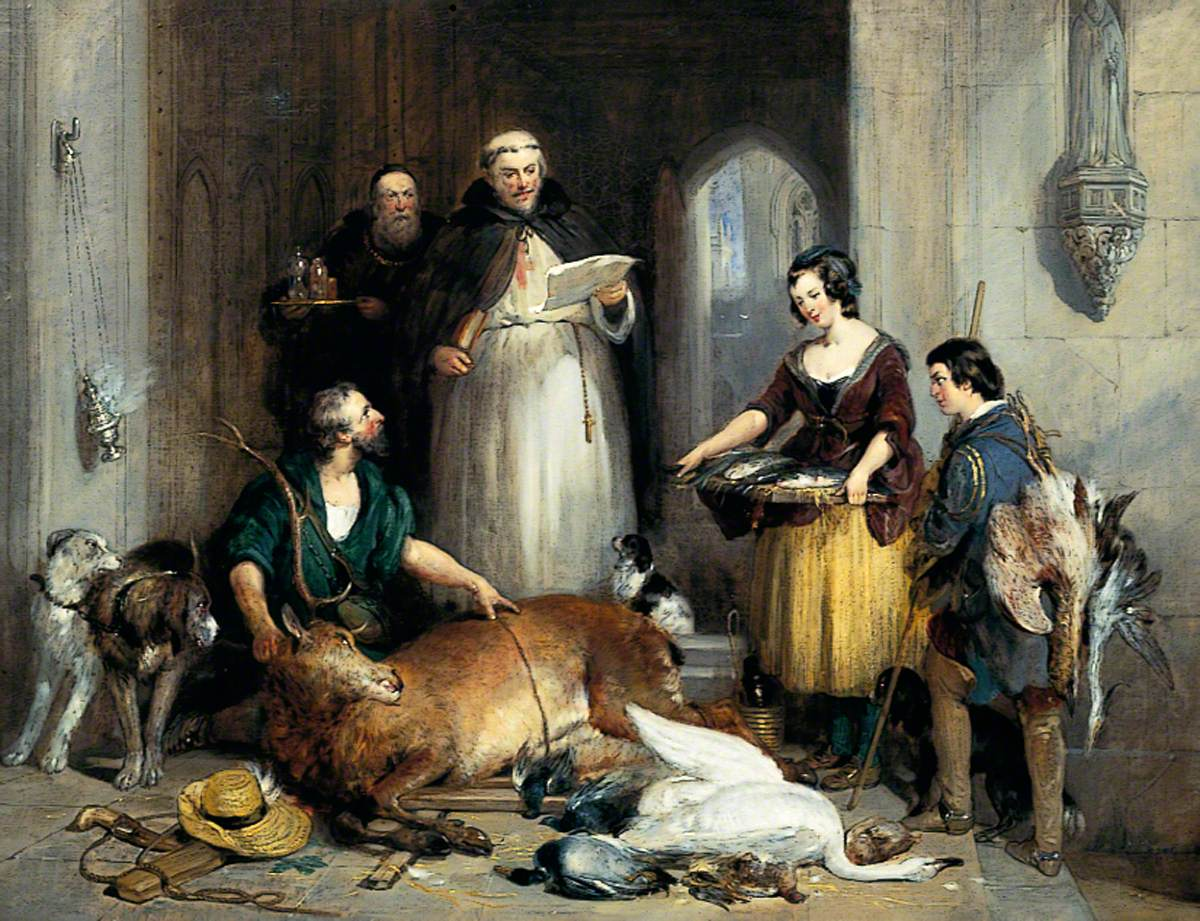
Bolton Abbey in the Olden Time by Edwin Landseer, 1834

The views and setting of the priory's remains have been immortalised in painting and poetry.

Most notably a painting by Edwin Landseer and several watercolours by J. M. W. Turner one of which, Bolton Abbey, Yorkshire (1809), is held at the British Museum. The young Brontë sisters are believed to have visited the estate while Landseer was in residence. (Researching for his painting Bolton Abbey in Olden Times, the young authors were escorted on an exclusive guided tour by an unnamed 'E'.) The following year Charlotte Brontë exhibited a drawing 'Bolton Abbey' alongside stars of the day at the Royal Northern Festival of Arts, Leeds. When first discovered by Jane Sellars and Christine Alexander in 1994, it was thought based on Turner's view of 1809, but further research, and detail of a drifting heron relates the drawing more closely to Landseer's oil-sketch of the same scene, which shows a heron drifting toward Charlotte's reciprocal bird, as if to embrace. Landseer's sketch was never exhibited or reproduced, it reiterates therefore that the Brontës met the influential artist in 1833. William Wordsworth's poem The White Doe of Rylstone was inspired by a visit to Bolton Abbey in 1807.

- In Anthony Trollope's Lady Anna (1874), an excursion is made to Wharfedale, and a dramatic incident takes place on the banks of the river that encircles the Abbey.
- Characters played by Richard Harris and Rachel Roberts picnic at Bolton Abbey in the 1963 film This Sporting Life.
- The abbey appears in episodes 28 and 29 of Emmerdale Farm in January 1973, appearing as a fictional abbey ruins that are within walking distance of the local village of Beckindale.
- In episode 6 of the BBC series The Trip, Bolton Abbey is visited.
- A blurred photo of the Abbey is used for the cover of Faith by The Cure, an album from 1981, with the picture taken by Andy Vella.
- The 1985 music video for the Love and Rockets song "If There's A Heaven Above" was filmed at Bolton Abbey.
- The BBC Television series Gunpowder (2017) used Bolton Abbey as a location.
- Bolton Abbey is depicted by the third movement of Yorkshire-born Arthur Wood's suite My Native Heath, the fourth movement of which is Barwick Green, best known as the theme for the long-running radio series The Archers.

== See also ==
- List of monastic houses in North Yorkshire
- List of monastic houses in England
- List of English abbeys, priories and friaries serving as parish churches
- Grade I listed buildings in North Yorkshire (district)
- Listed buildings in Bolton Abbey

== Gallery ==
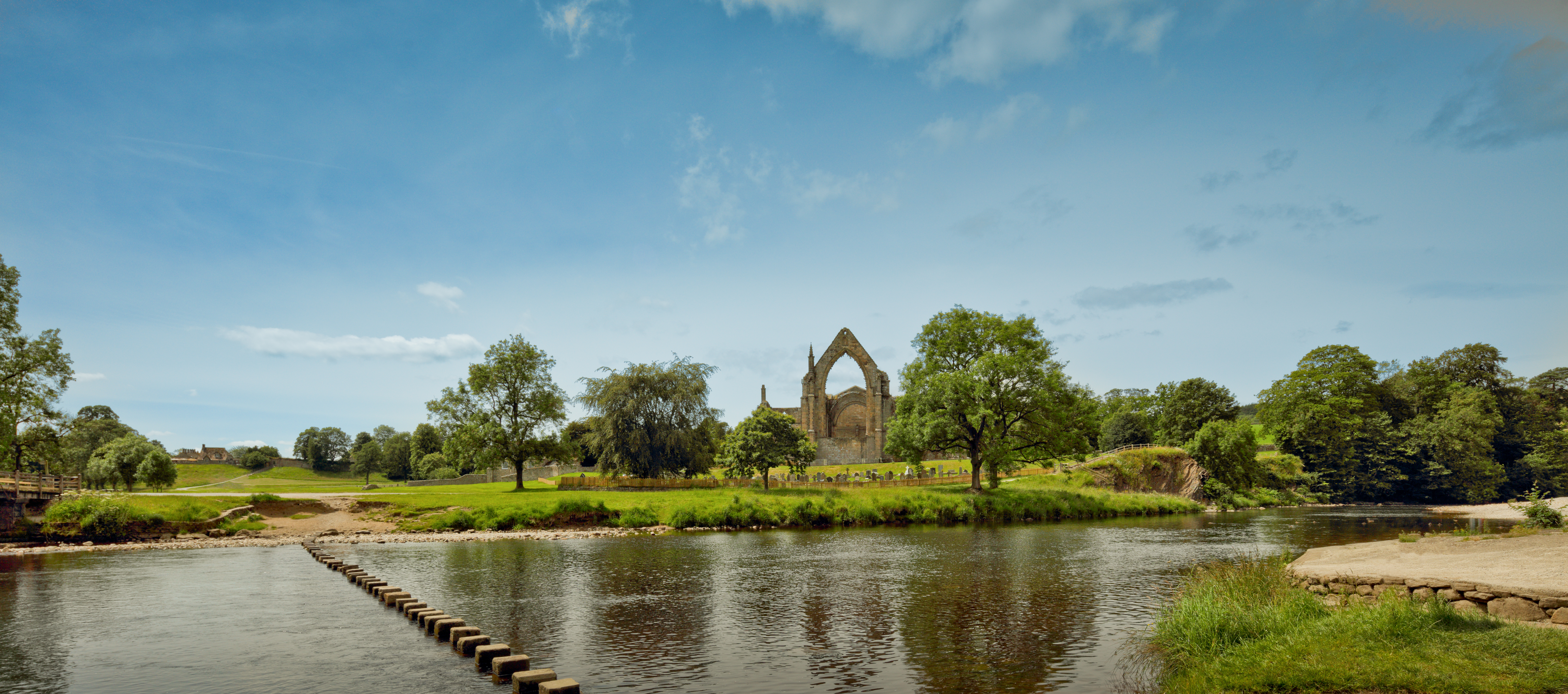

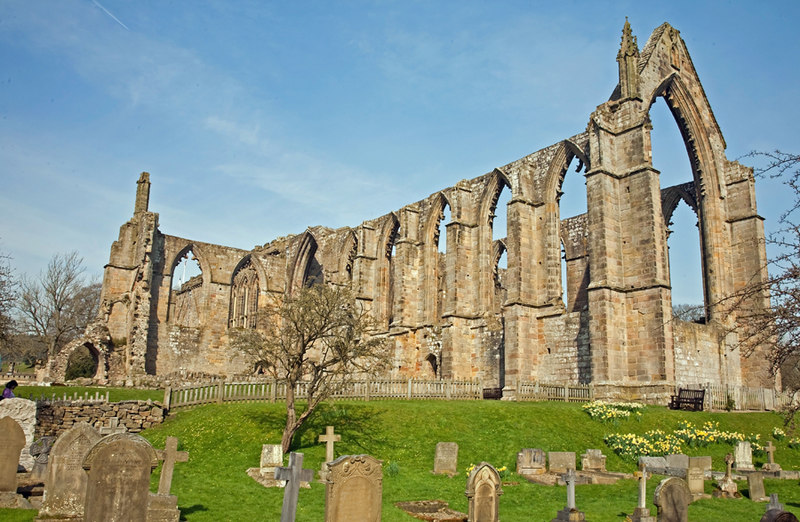

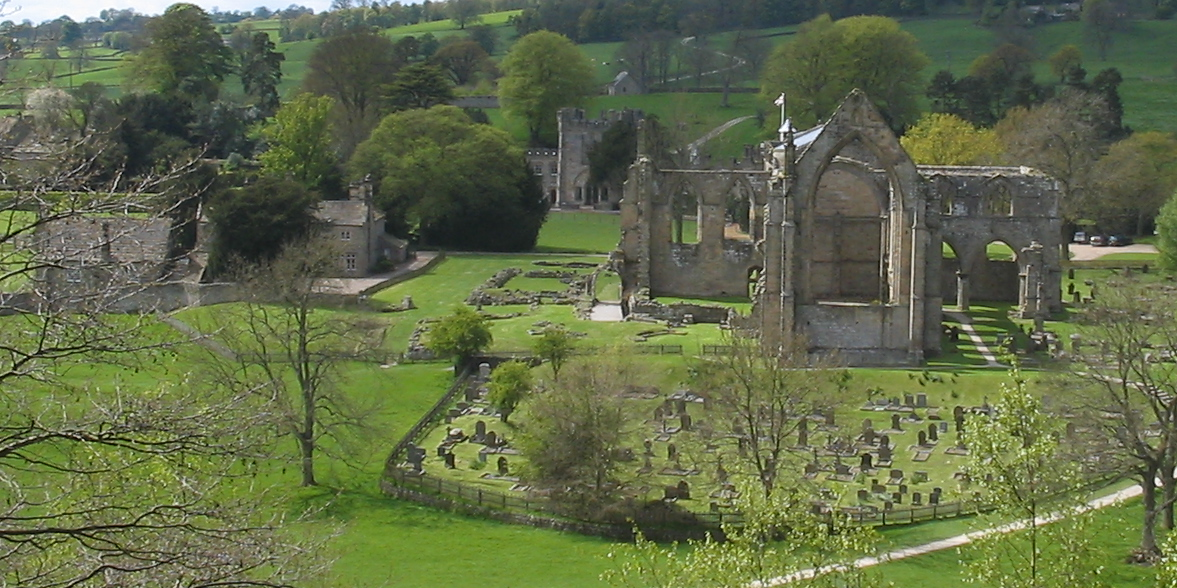

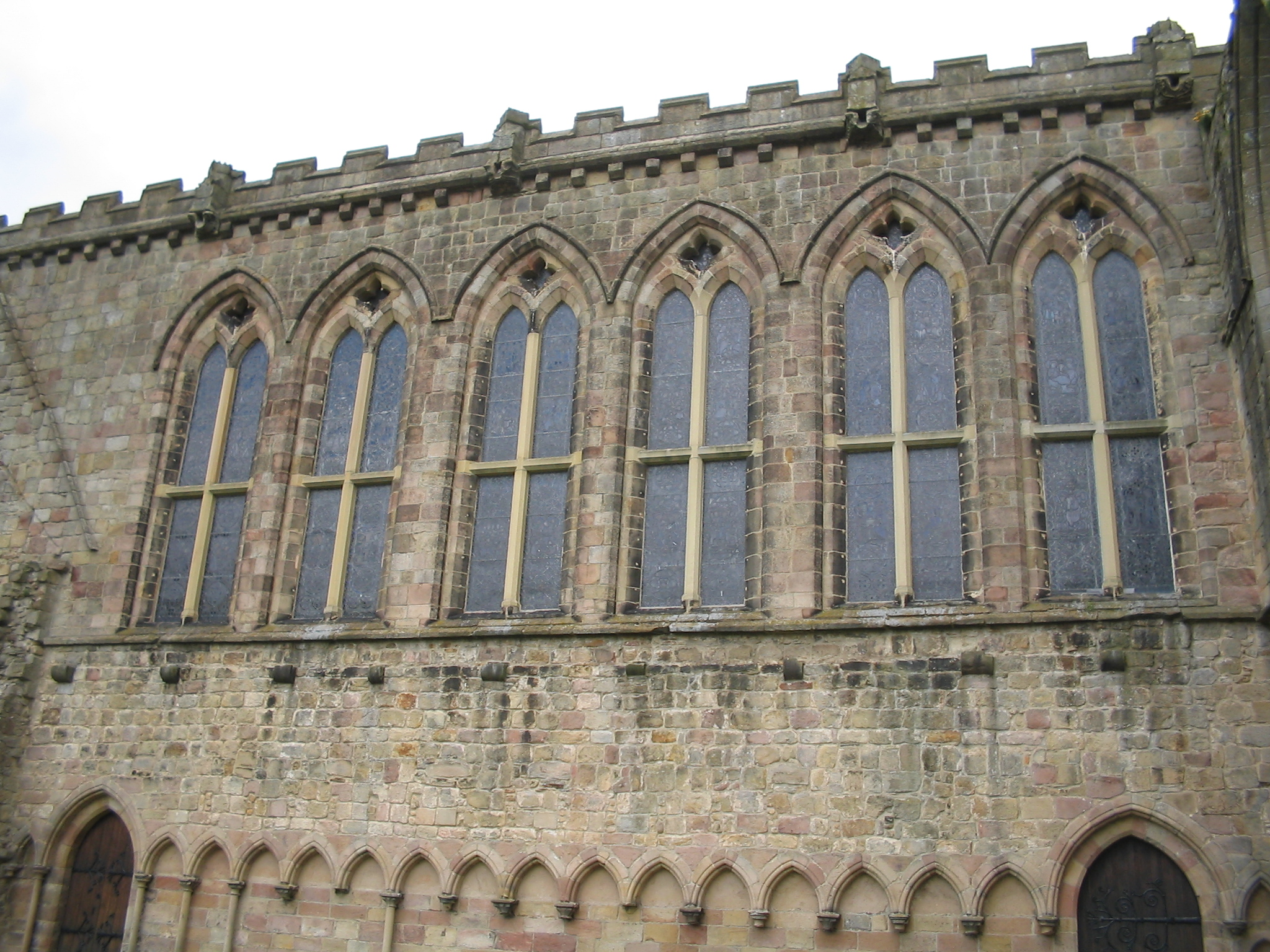
Stained glass windows of the Priory Church

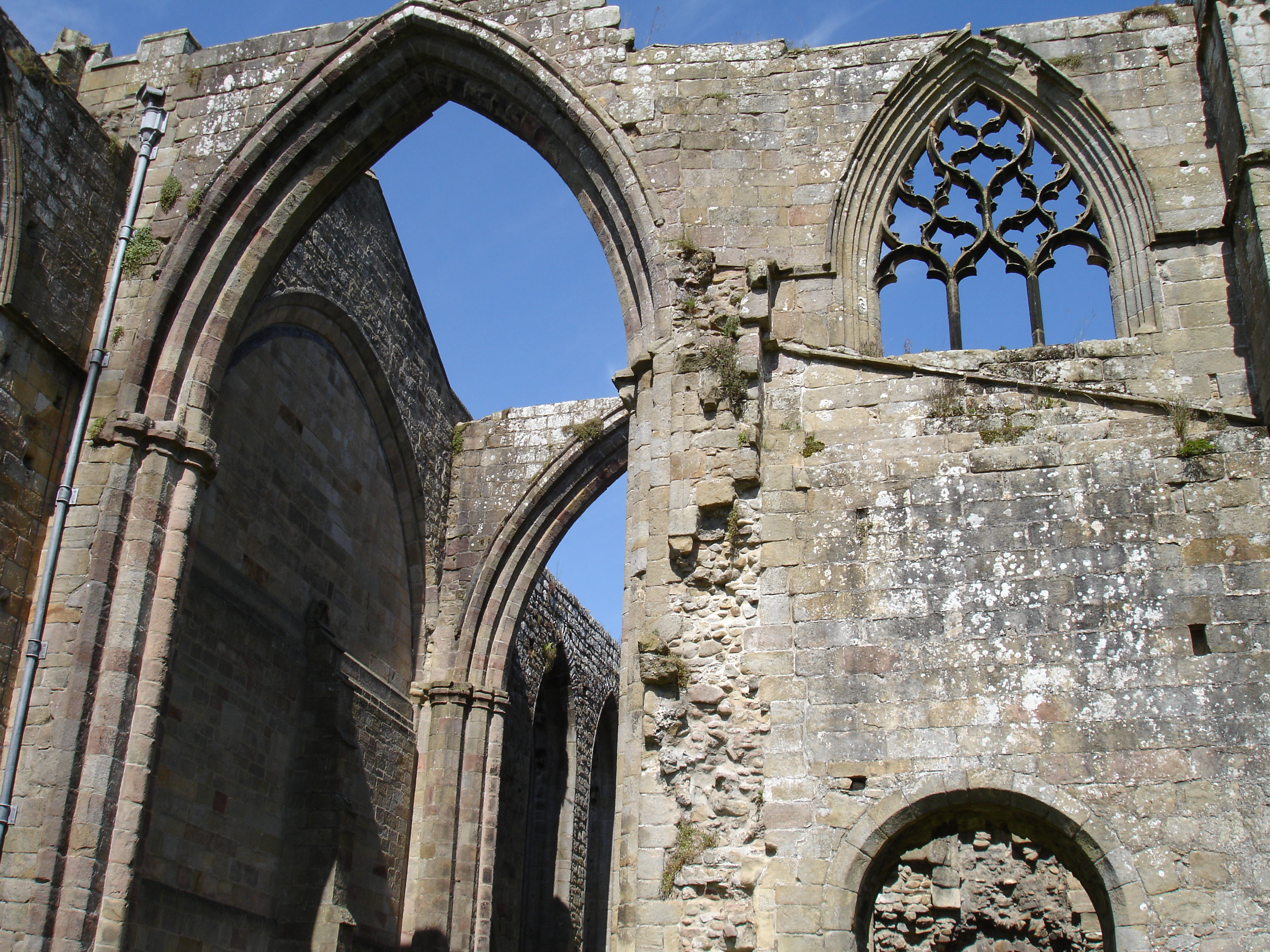

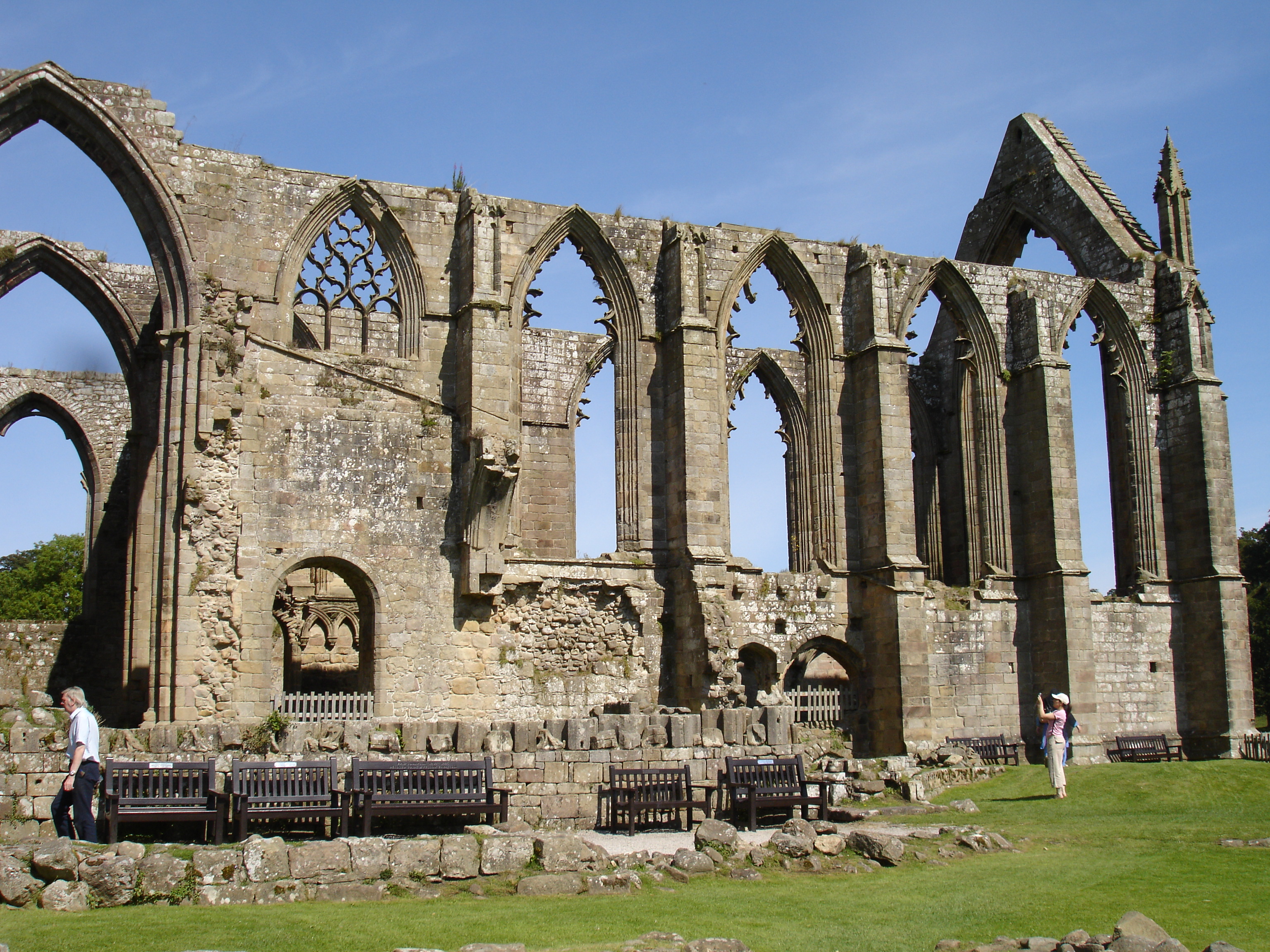

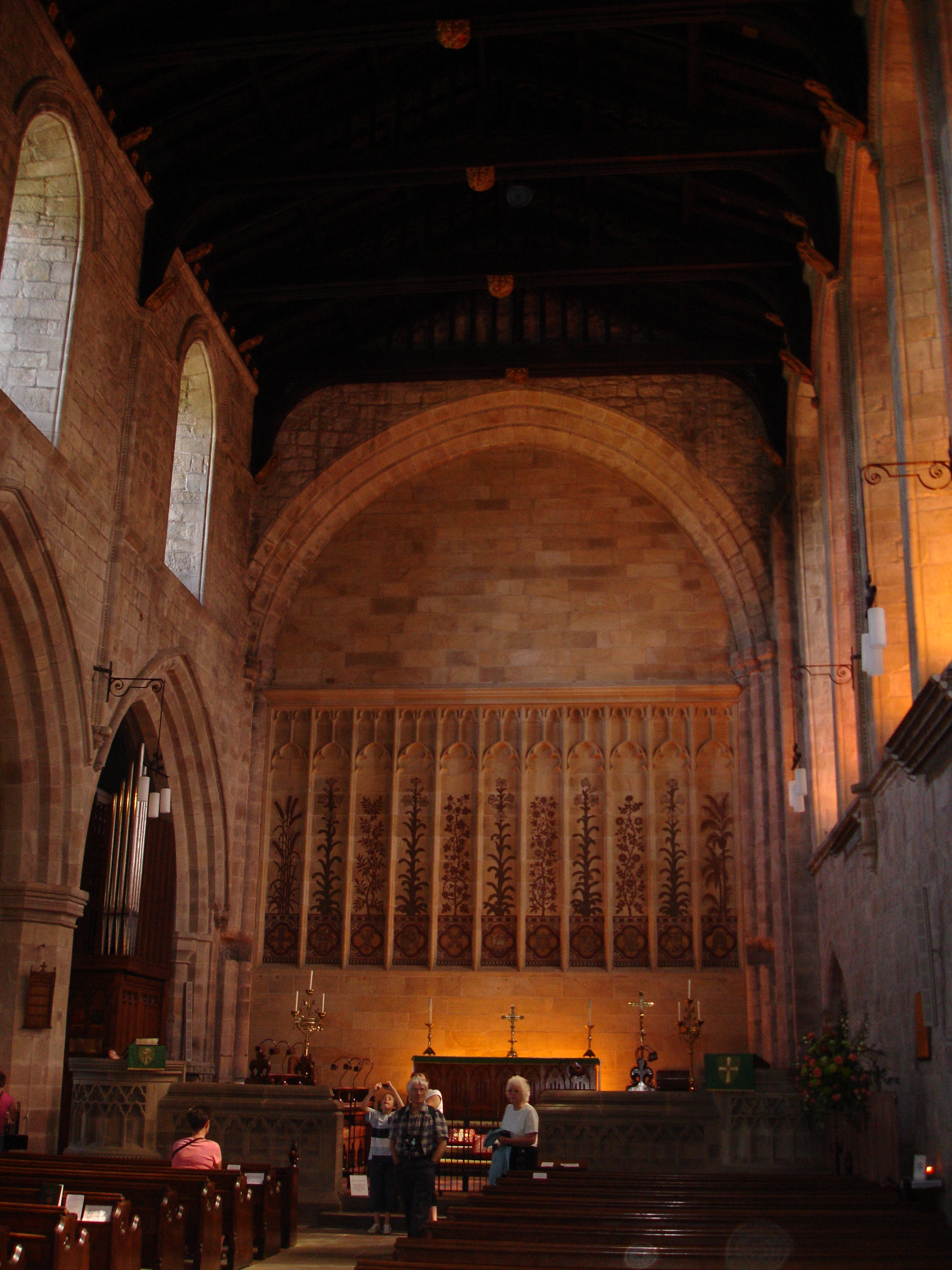

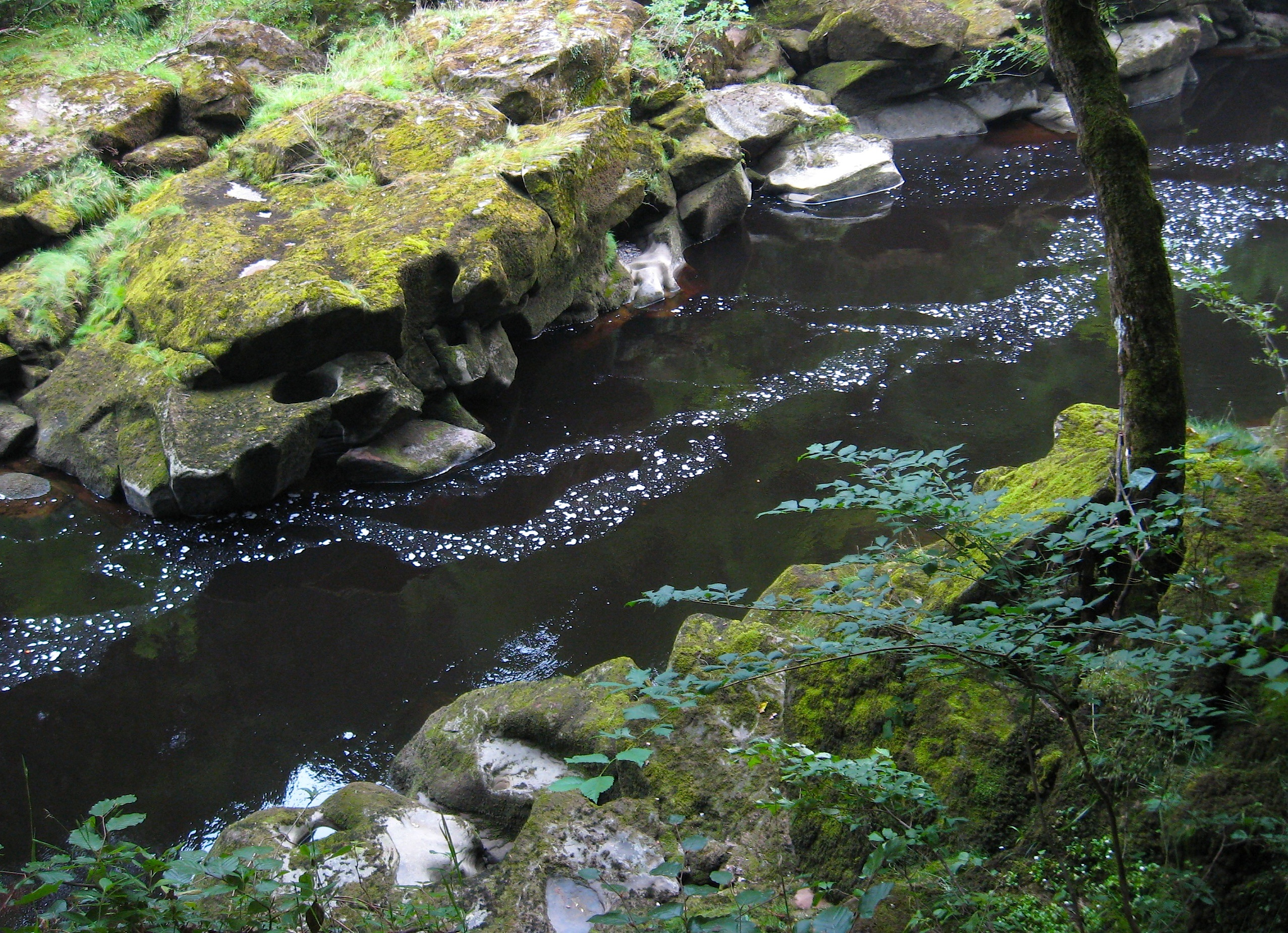
Walker's view of Strid Wood

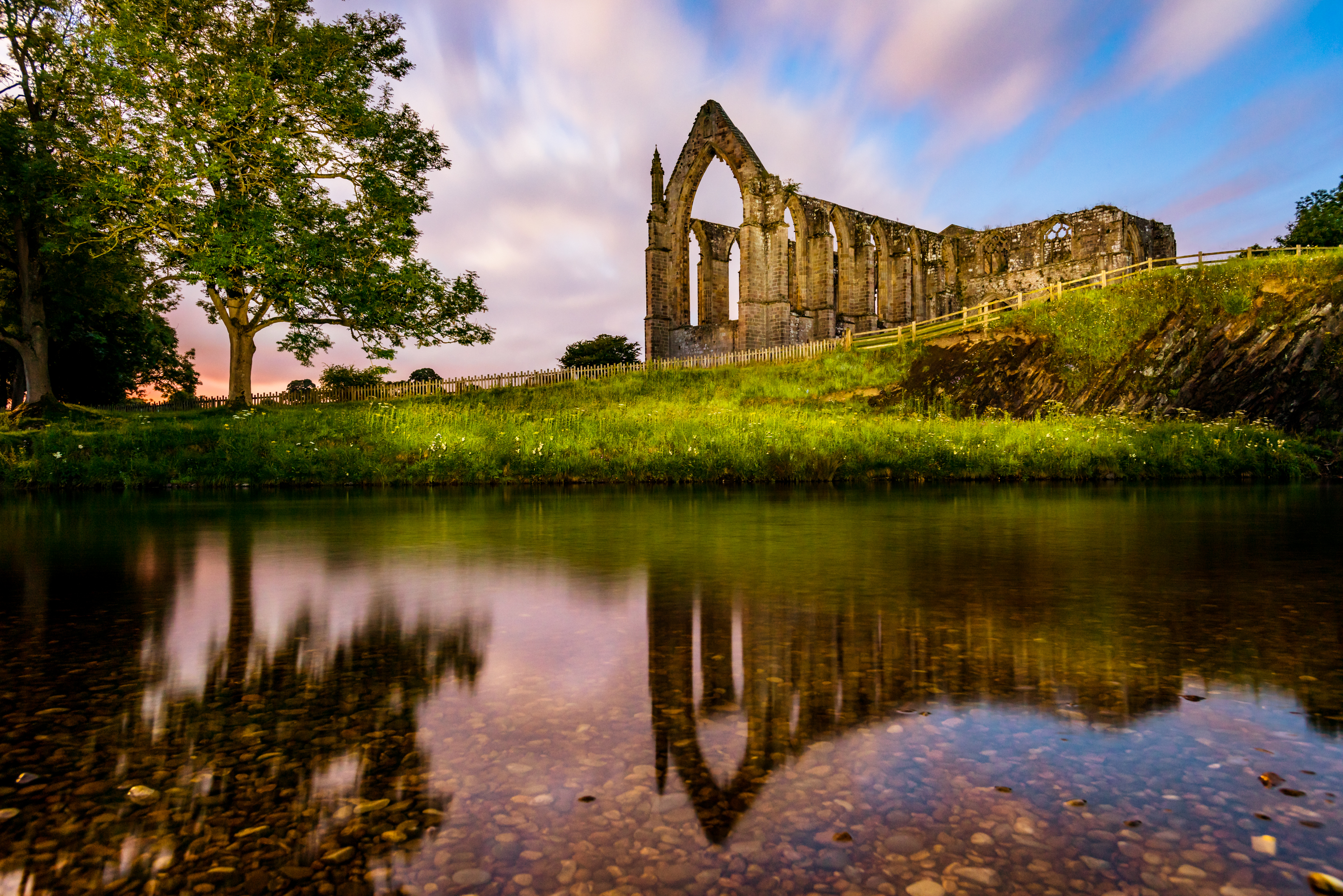

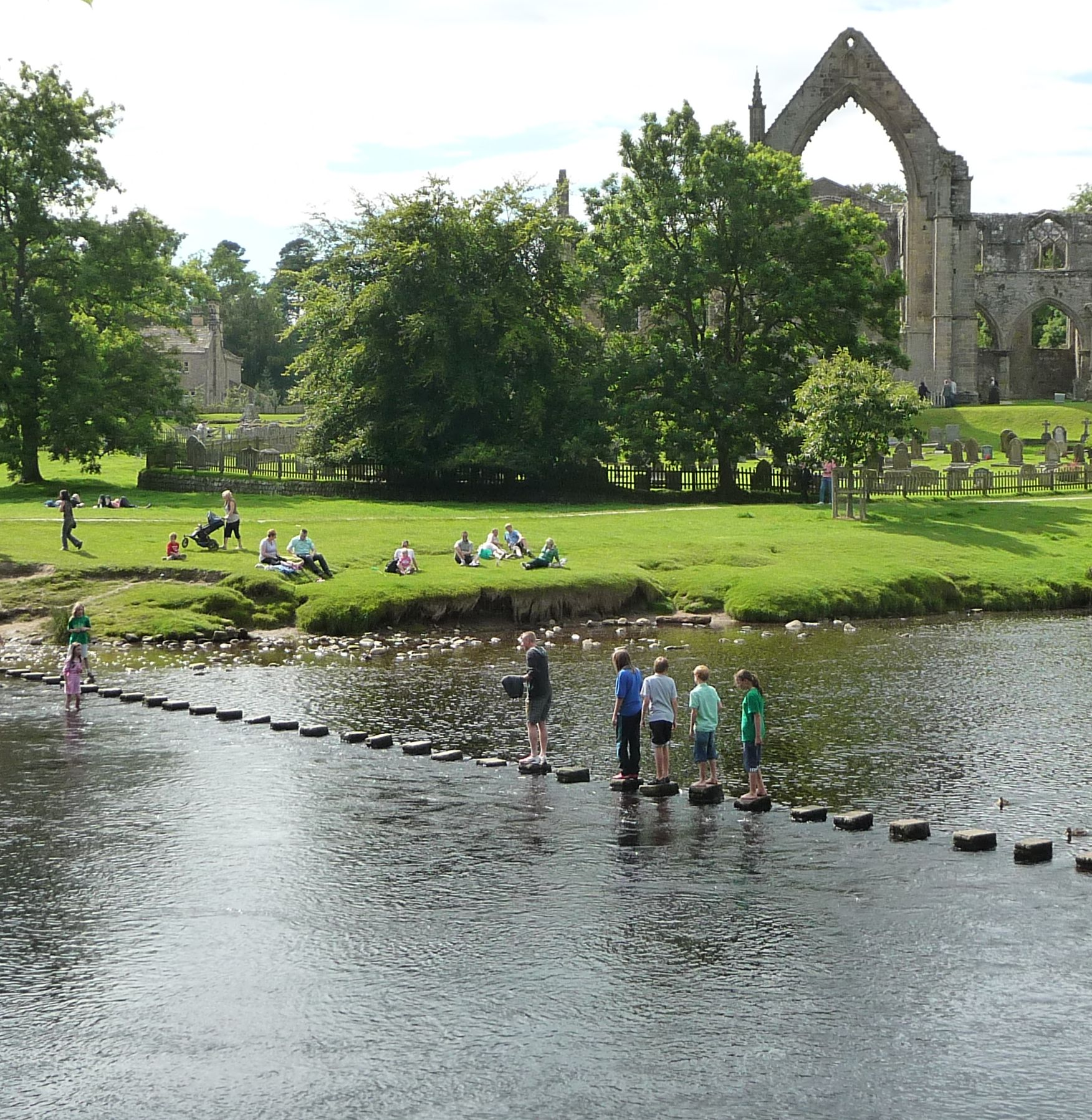
The iconic stepping stones and Bolton Abbey

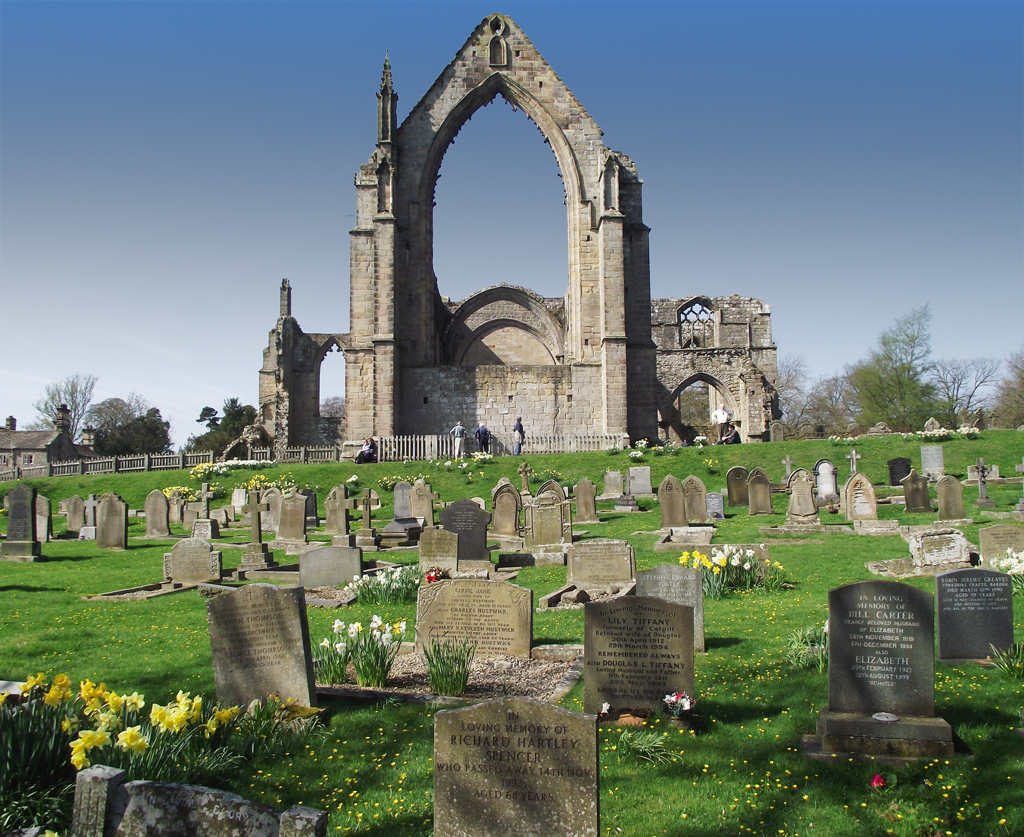
The graveyard adjacent to the Priory

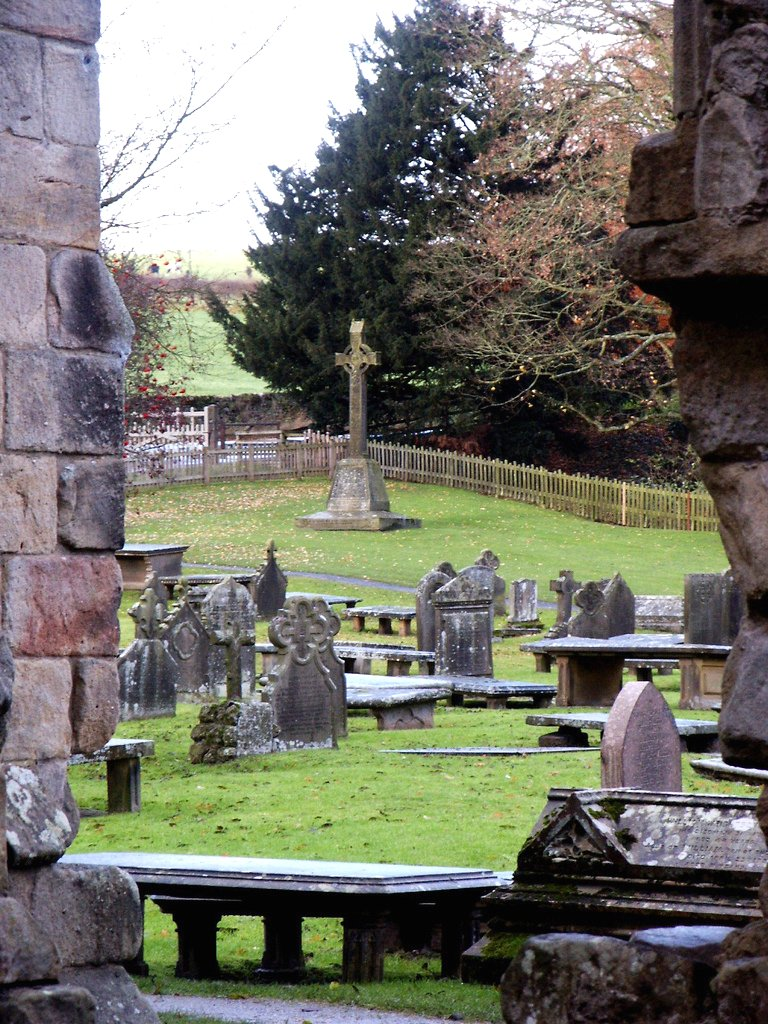
