= Quality Practice Award =

The Quality Practice Award (QPA) is given to general practitioner medical practices in the United Kingdom in recognition of high quality patient care by all members of staff. It is awarded by the Royal College of General Practitioners (RCGP).

For the practice to achieve the award, evidence has to be provided that conforms to set criteria in the following areas:

- Practice Profile
- Availability
- Clinical Care
- Communication
- Continuity of Care
- Equipment and Minor Surgery
- Health Promotion
- Information Technology
- Medical Records
- Nursing and Midwifery
- Practice Management
- Other Professional Staff
- Patient Issues
- Premises
- Prescribing/Repeat Prescribing
- The Practice as a Learning Organisation

After the evidence is completed, an onsite visit during a normal working day is made, to assess the practice and interview staff.
