= Yorkshire Dales Railway =

Railway line in North Yorkshire, England

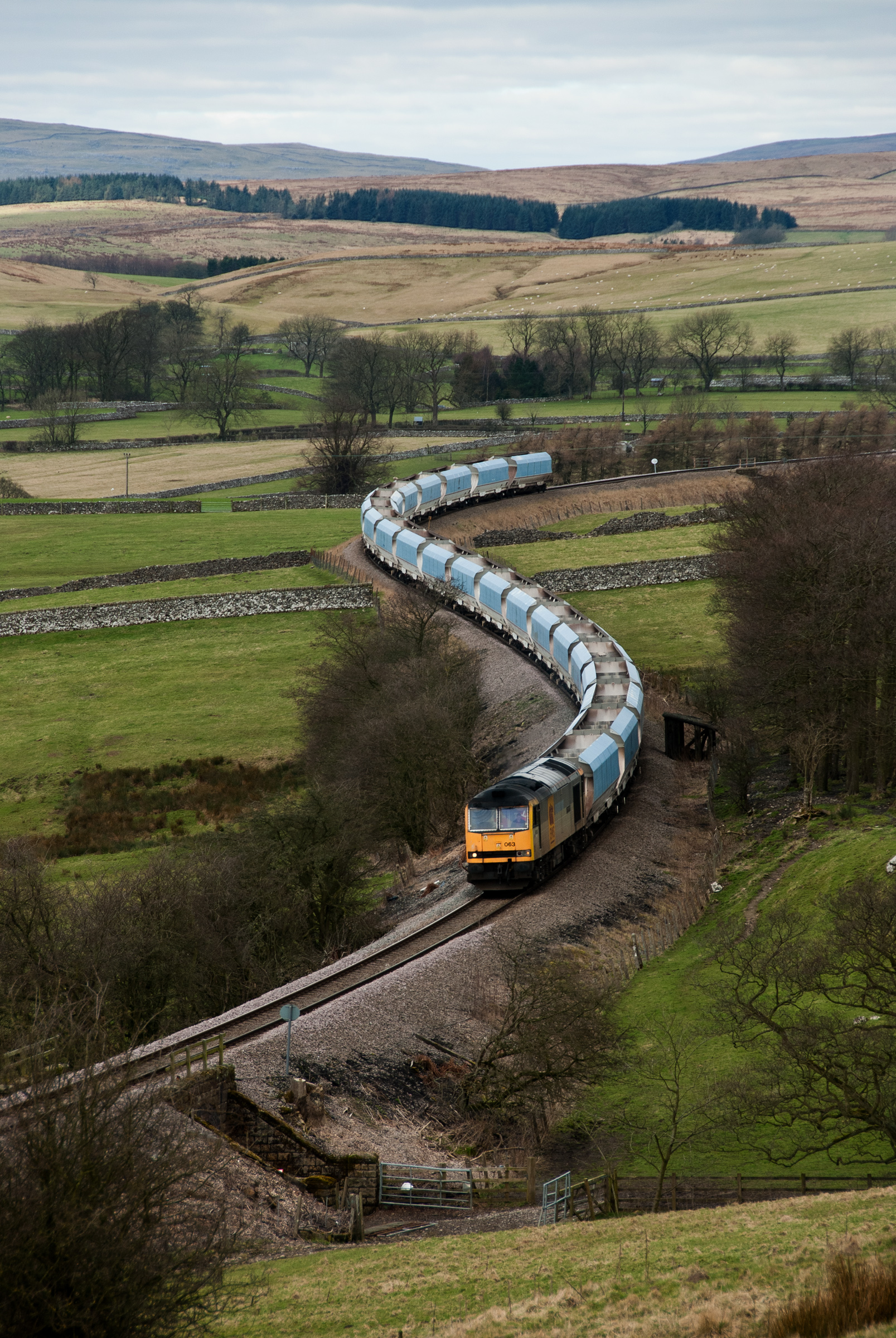
- 60083 James Murray passes Rylstone with a stone service to Redcar in 2008

Overview
- Other name: Grassington Branch
- Status: Open
- Termini: Skipton railway station; Swinden Quarry

Service
- Type: Heavy rail

History
- Commenced: 7 June 1900
- Opened: 2 July 1902

Technical
- Line length: 11 mi (18 km)
- Number of tracks: 1 (was dual to former Embsay Junction)
- Track gauge: 4 ft 8 1/2 in (1,435 mm) standard gauge
- Signalling: One-train working

The Yorkshire Dales Railway was a branch line linking the town of Skipton with the villages of Rylstone, Threshfield and Grassington in North Yorkshire, England. There were two stations on the line – Grassington & Threshfield and Rylstone – and a connection via the Skipton to Ilkley Line to Skipton.

The line closed to passengers in 1930, but is still in use up to Swinden Quarry for the transport of aggregates. It is also known as the Grassington Branch.

== History ==
Yorkshire Dales Railway (Skipton to Grassington) Act 1897
- Act of Parliament
- Parliament of the United Kingdom
- Long title: An Act for making a Railway from Skipton to Grassington in the West Riding of the County of York and for other purposes.
- Citation: 60 & 61 Vict. c. cxcv

Dates
- Royal assent: 6 August 1897

Text of statute as originally enacted

The railway company was authorised by act of Parliament, the Yorkshire Dales Railway (Skipton to Grassington) Act 1897 (60 & 61 Vict. c. cxcv), dated 6 August 1897 after several previous attempts to open a line to Grassington including one which would have driven eastwards from Gargrave. The first sod was cut on 7 June 1900 and the single-track line was opened to traffic on 29 July 1902. It was operated by the Midland Railway from the start.

The station at Grassington & Threshfield was built 0.5 miles (0.8 km) short of Grassington itself, thereby saving the cost of having to cross the River Wharfe. The station was built as a through station despite being the line's terminus, because there were plans to extend the line northwards to Hawes, where it would meet the Wensleydale Railway. Those plans were never realised. There is only one significant engineering structure on the line; Haw Bank Tunnel (which lies under the A65 road and is 220 yards (200 m) long) which was built as part of the Skipton to Ilkley line.

The line was single track from Embsay Junction throughout, however, the section from Skipton to Embsay Junction was double track by virtue of the already existing Skipton to Ilkley line which was opened in 1888. A passing loop was installed at Rylstone when traffic from the quarries at Swinden and Skirethornes (the latter via the 2-mile (3.2 km) tramway at Threshfield) increased in number. The passing loop was actually north west of the station's one platform, so trains would have to wait outside the station for the other service to pass. The loop was removed in 1937, as a result of, but some years after, the cessation of passenger workings. Passenger services on the line typically numbered seven a day in each direction, with one southbound working being split at Embsay Junction; the front portion of the train would go forward to Skipton, whilst the rear portion was coupled up to another locomotive, and would run east via Ilkley to Bradford Forster Square.

Skirethorns Quarry, was operated by John Delaney and was 1 mile (2 km) north west of Grassington station. Connection to the end of the YDR was by a small exchange siding and a 2 feet 6 inches (0.76 m) gauge rope-hauled tramway. The exchange siding was just east of the main road through Threshfield, and the tramway extended to Skirethorns underneath the Grassington and Kettlewell roads. Traffic consisted of lime being taken to the Sheffield steel mills and had ceased by 1966 when the quarry was taken over by another company.

Regular passenger services ceased on 22 September 1930, but freight and occasional excursion trains continued until 11 August 1969. The line was the last steam-worked branchline on the British Railways system, with steam finally giving way in the summer of 1968. After August 1969, the line was cut back to Swinden Quarry (9 miles 13 chains (14.7 km)) and it focussed strictly on sending out limestone. In 1970, new owners promoted an upsurge in rail-borne traffic which necessitated a pipeline being laid to power the kilns with gas rather than coal. As the B6265 (Skipton to Grassington road) ran between the quarry works and the railway, movements across the road had become hazardous and the company paid for the road to be moved to the eastern side of the railway line. This was completed in 1973.

The YDR remains a freight-only line used for carrying bulk trainloads of limestone aggregate from the quarry to terminals in Leeds, Hull, Birmingham and Wellingborough.

The "Yorkshire Dales Railway" name survives as that of the trust that operates the Embsay and Bolton Abbey Steam Railway.

The idea of full re-opening of the line to passengers, or an extension of the current Embsay and Bolton Abbey Steam Railway into Skipton, has been raised ever since the line's closure to passengers.

In January 2019, Campaign for Better Transport released a report identifying the line which was listed as Priority 2 for reopening. Priority 2 is for those lines which require further development or a change in circumstances (such as housing developments).
