= Bell Busk =

Hamlet in North Yorkshire, England

Coordinates: 54.0039°N 2.1479°W

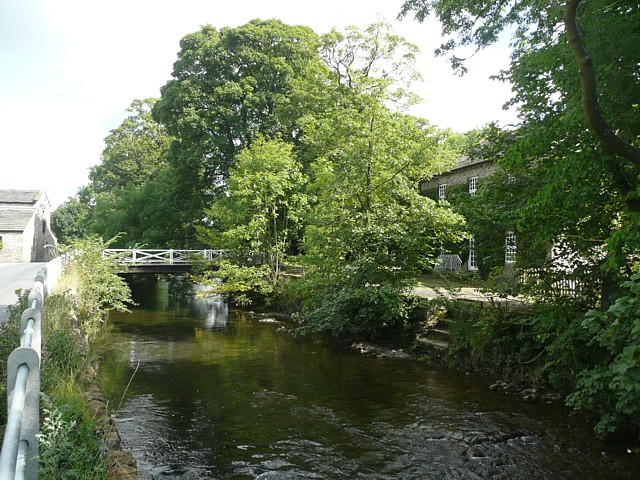
- Mill Bridge, Bell Busk

- Location within North Yorkshire
- Civil parish: Coniston Cold
- Unitary authority: North Yorkshire
- Ceremonial county: North Yorkshire
- Region: Yorkshire and the Humber
- Country: England
- Sovereign state: United Kingdom
- Post town: Skipton
- Postcode district: BD23
- Dialling code: 01729
- Police: North Yorkshire
- Fire: North Yorkshire
- Ambulance: Yorkshire
- UK Parliament: Skipton and Ripon

Bell Busk is a hamlet situated in the county of North Yorkshire, England. The hamlet is located at the southern end of Malhamdale where the nascent River Aire meets Otterburn Beck. The village is 7 miles (11 km) north west of Skipton and used to have a railway station on the line linking Skipton and Hellifield.

Historical industries in the hamlet consisted of a cotton mill that became a silk mill, with quarrying prevalent also. Tourism became the leading industry in the 20th century.

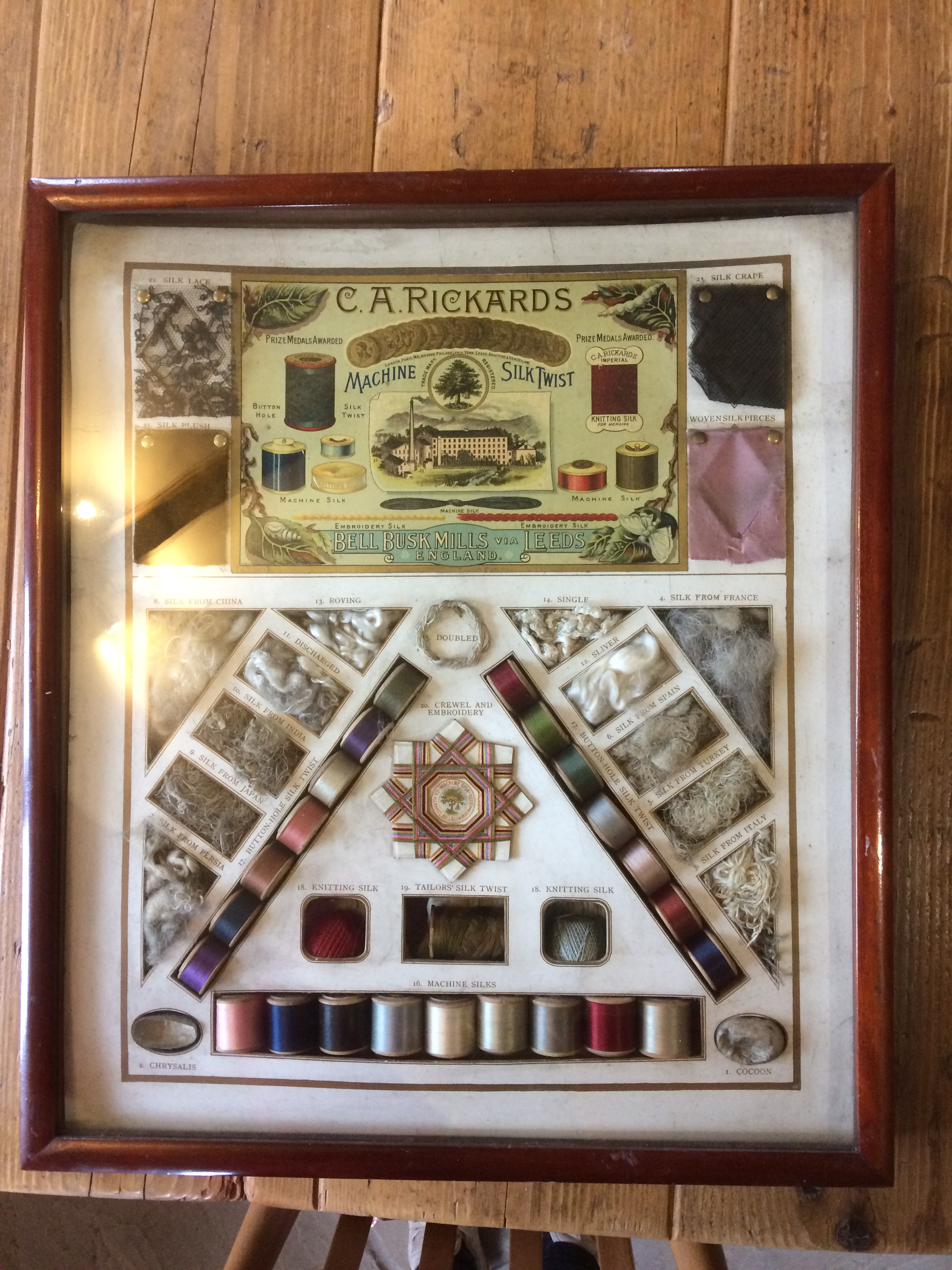
Showcase of silks and threads from Bell Busk silk mill

== History ==
The name of Bell Busk is believed to have been derived from Old Norse and Old English meaning the bell shaped bush. Bell Busk is 1 mile (1.6 km) north of Coniston Cold, 7 miles (11 km) north west of Skipton, 5 miles (8 km) south of Malham and 5 miles (8 km) east of Hellifield. The hamlet sits at the southern end of Malhamdale, where the River Aire meets Otterburn Beck. Malhamdale is the very northern end of Airedale. Official records of the area make no mention of the hamlet until 1585, even then, it was not shown on mapping until the early 17th century. One of the oldest houses is a Yorkshire laithe known as Granny House Farm, nowadays known as Granny House on the old Roman Road; Mark House Lane. Granny House is mentioned in the walking book 'Through Airedale from Goole to Malham' by Johnnie Gray. In 1891 it is described as a 300 year old 'Public' and a stout edifice.

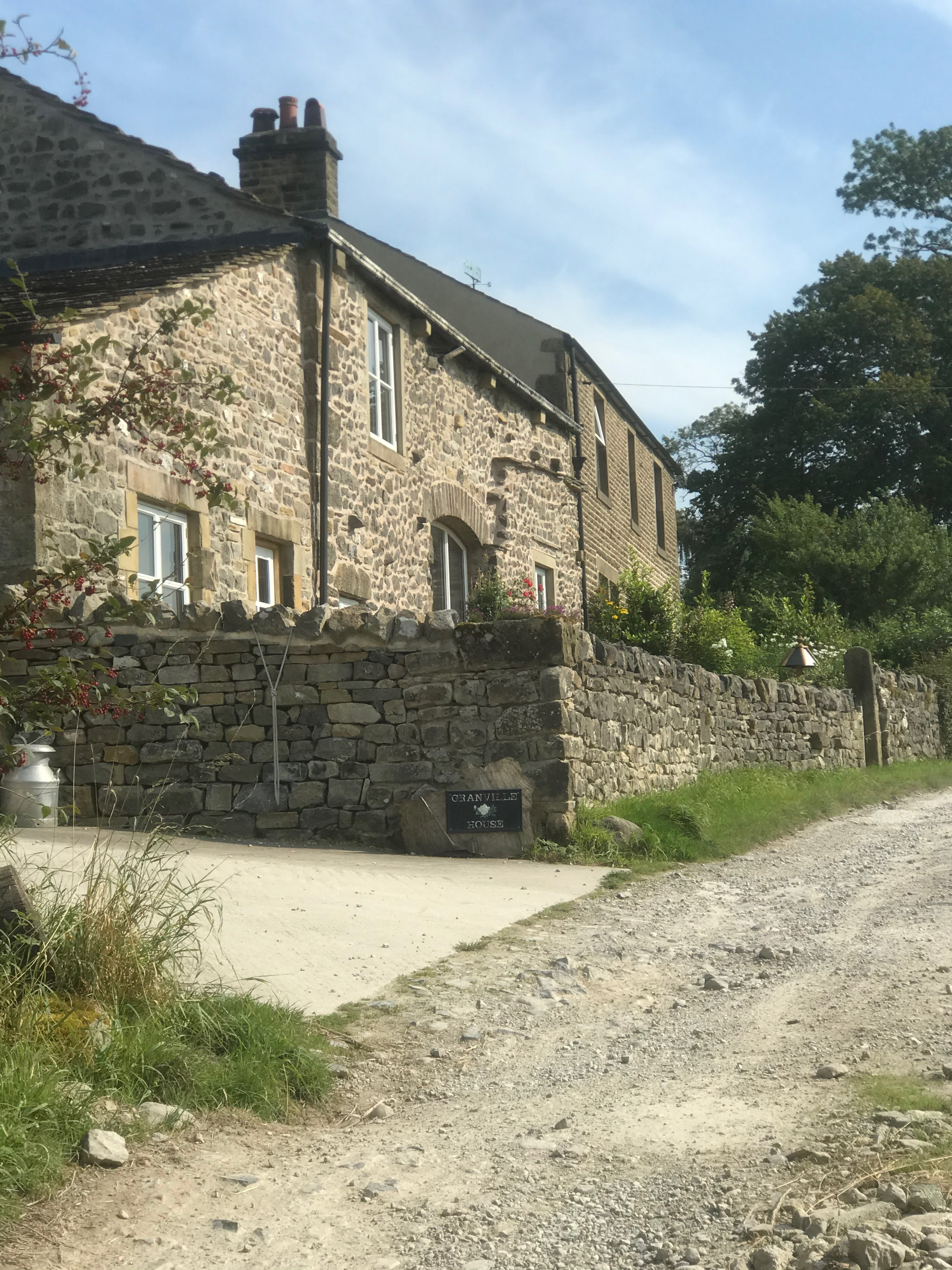
Granny House

There are two Grade II listed bridges in Bell Busk: Red Bridge over Otterburn Beck and Bell Busk Bridge over The River Aire.

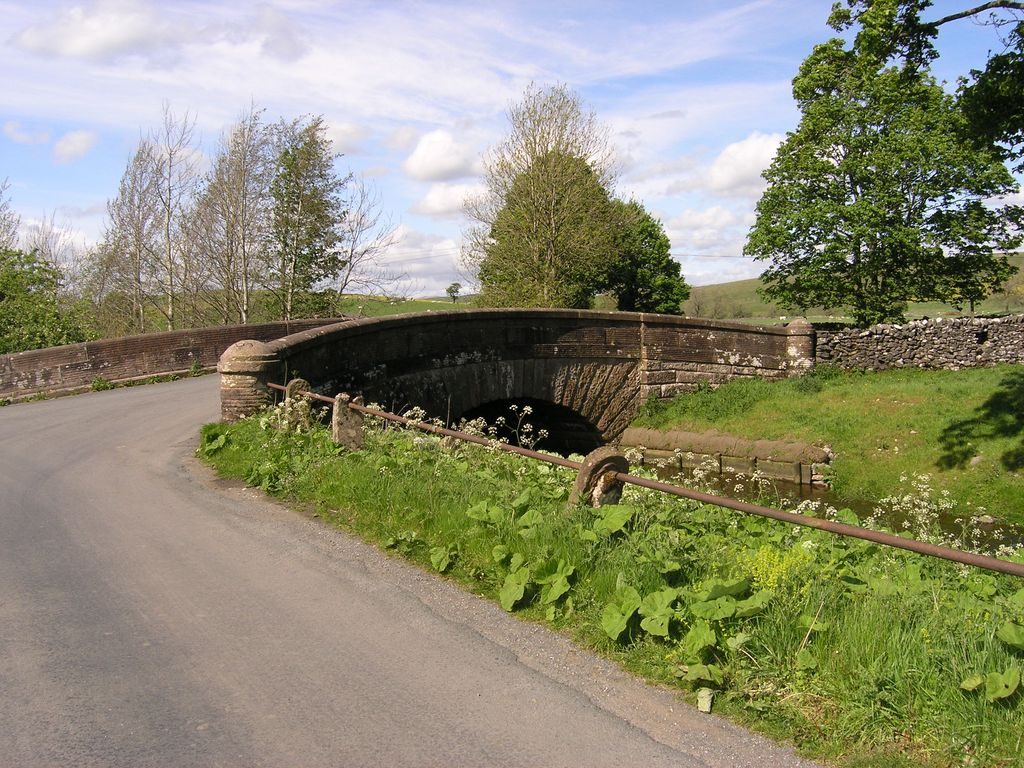
Red Bridge over Otterburn Beck

In 1781, a weir and large mill pond with a long mill race were constructed on the Aire to provide water power for a silk mill. The weir was located 7 miles (11 km) south of Malham and 83 miles (134 km) from the mouth of the Aire on the River Ouse. The mill has long since been demolished after it was destroyed by fire, but the weir was only removed in 2018 to make fish passage easier into the spawning grounds. This is to encourage salmon into the River Aire and its tributaries after a 200-year absence.

In the 19th century, quarrying became an important industry when at least three rock quarries were in operation; Field Rock Quarry to the west, Esh Bottom Quarry to the south west and Haw Crag Quarry to the east. Haw Crag was noted for its medium-purity limestone which was used in the local buildings. Quarrying here was on quite a large scale compared to other quarries in the area; 30,000 tonnes (33,000 tons) was processed in the month of January 1877 alone. Haw Crag Quarry is now an SSSI as it "key site in the understanding of carbonate environments in the Craven Basin."

Bell Busk used to be in the West Riding of Yorkshire, but since the county boundary changes of 1974, it is now in North Yorkshire. From 1974 to 2023 it was part of the Craven District, it is now administered by the unitary North Yorkshire Council.

Metcalfe Models and Toys, a model kit firm that specialises in cardboard buildings used for dioramas and by model railway hobbyists, is based in Bell Busk.

Bell Busk is located in the civil parish of Coniston Cold and is included in the statistics there for the 2011 census.

== Harrison Clock ==
There is a clock in St. Peter's Church made by James Harrison in 1845.

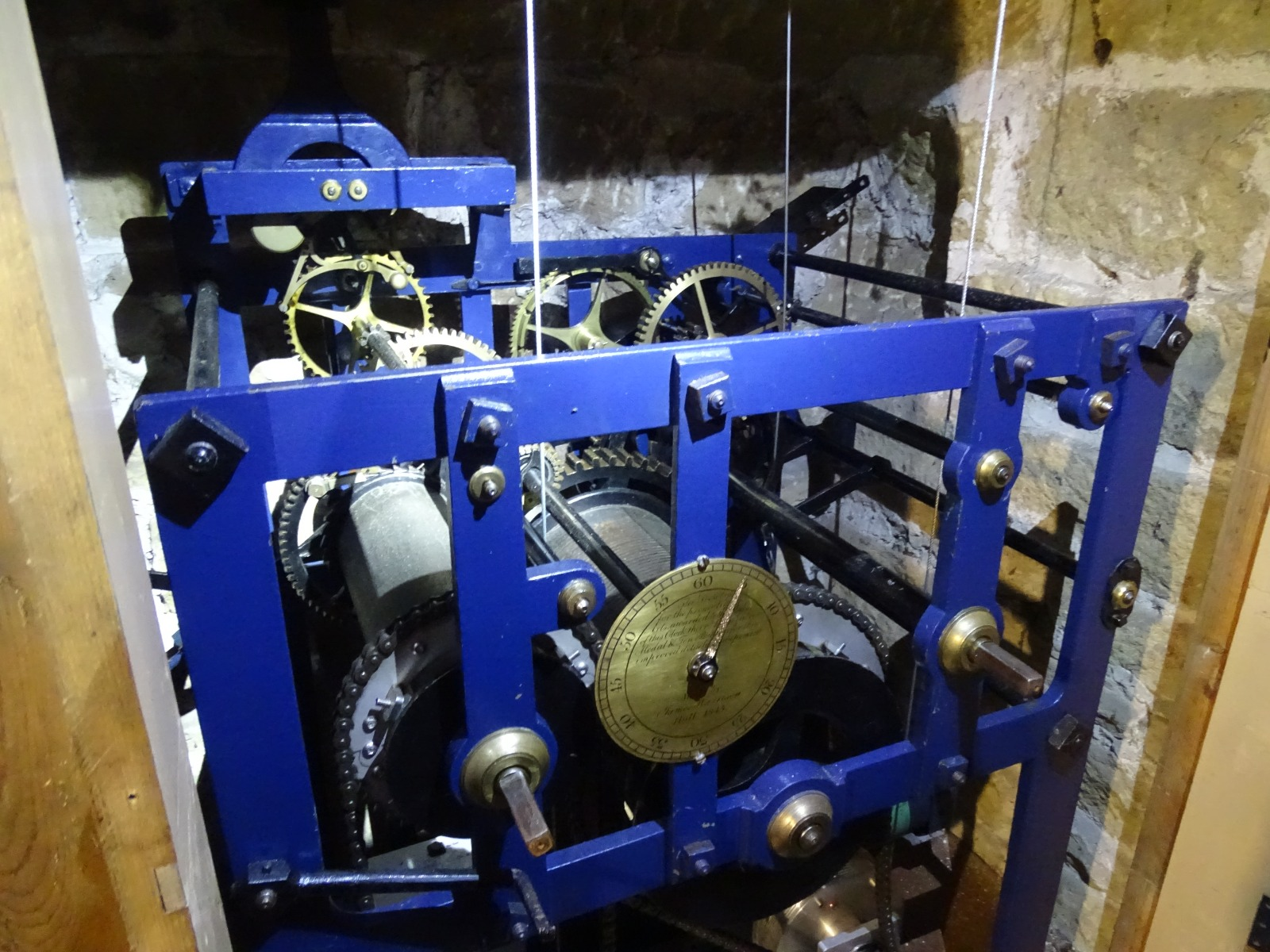
Workings of Harrison clock

== Transport ==
Originally, Bell Busk was on the packhorse route between Skipton and Settle, which meant the road veered off at Coniston Cold, whereas this now goes directly west towards Hellifield as the A65 road. The junction and road leading up to Bell Busk from Coniston Cold is narrow and can cause access problems.

The hamlet had a railway station on the "Little" North Western Railway between Skipton and Hellifield. As it was the nearest station to Malham Cove and Malhamdale, it took on a far greater importance than other settlements in the dale due to it being a disembarkation point for travellers. The station site was used as a backdrop to the Bette Davis film Another Man's Poison in 1951, but was closed to passengers in 1959.

The long distance paths, The Airedale Way, the Trans-Dale Trail 2 and the Rail to Trail Walk (the Bentham Line) pass through the hamlet on their way north (to the source of the River Aire for the Airedale Way and Greta Bridge for the Trans-Dale Trail), and westwards respectively. Both the Pennine Way and the Wild Yorkshire Way, pass to the east of the Hamlet, with many cottages and other overnight accommodation being offered in Bell Busk.

== Notable people ==
- William Cecil Slingsby - noted mountaineer, was born in the village.
