= Bell Busk railway station =

Disused railway station in North Yorkshire, England

Bell Busk
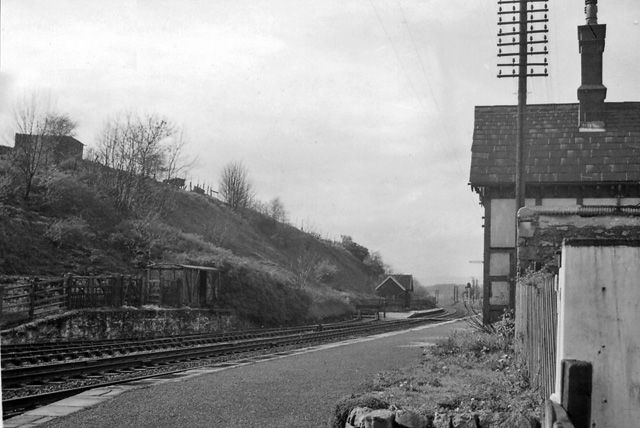
- Bell Busk station after closure in 1961

General information
- Location: Bell Busk, North Yorkshire; England
- Coordinates: 54.00415°N 2.152°W
- Grid reference: SD9056
- Platforms: 2

Other information
- Status: Disused

History
- Original company: "Little" North Western Railway
- Pre-grouping: Midland Railway
- Post-grouping: London, Midland & Scottish Railway

Key dates
- 30 July 1849: Opened
- 4 May 1959: Closed to passengers
Location

Bell Busk railway station served the hamlet of Bell Busk in North Yorkshire, England. It was located on the Leeds to Morecambe Line between Gargrave and Hellifield, 32 3/4 miles (53 km) north of Leeds.

== History ==
It was opened by the "Little" North Western Railway in July 1849, as one of the intermediate stations on their line between Skipton and Ingleton which subsequently became part of a through route between West Yorkshire and the Lancashire seaside town of Morecambe (and ultimately part of the Midland Railway main line from London to Scotland). The main buildings were located on the southbound side, whilst the two offset platforms were initially linked by a foot crossing. This, however, was replaced subsequently by a footbridge, possibly as the result of a fatal accident on the crossing in 1880 that resulted in the deaths of two elderly travellers.

Although situated some way from the nearest large communities, it was the most convenient station for the village of Malham and the surrounding countryside; as a popular tourist destination, it was advertised in papers as Bell Busk for Malham. Consequently, the station was well patronised by ramblers heading for Malhamdale, as well as by local farmers sending their produce & livestock to market in Skipton and Leeds.

The station also had another somewhat unusual claim to fame, in that it was used as a shooting location for the 1951 feature film Another Man's Poison. The film's main star, noted American actress Bette Davis, was apparently so impressed by it (according to reports in the local press) that she enquired if the station was for sale. It is not known whether her interest was genuine or not, but no formal purchase offer was made. It remained in use until 1959, when it was closed by the British Transport Commission. Although more than 100 local objections were lodged to the proposed closure, the local Transport Users' Committee accepted the British Railways arguments that the station was unviable and it was duly closed to passengers on 4 May 1959.

== The site today ==
The station platforms and footbridge were removed some years after closure (along with the goods facilities and signal box), but the main station buildings were retained and sold off by British Rail for use as a private dwelling. They were subsequently converted into a guest house in 1982 and remain in use as such today. The adjacent line meanwhile remains a busy freight and passenger route between Leeds and Morecambe/Carlisle, with more than 20 trains each way passing every weekday.

== Incidents ==
- 1 June 1865 - a stoker off a goods train travelling through Bell Busk noticed that the wagon behind the engine was on fire. He attempted to fight the fire with water and in doing so, he became immersed in the flames and fell off the train and down an embankment. He succumbed to his injuries in October 1865.
- 2 April 1880 - two local farmers were crossing the line at Bell Busk to reach the southbound platform and then catch the Leeds train running from Morecambe. As they were on the foot crossing, an engine coupled to a brake van running from Hellifield knocked them down and they were killed instantly.
- 14 May 1900 - a man who had returned to England after being in South Africa for some time, was found dead by Bell Busk station. He was last seen in a compartment at Skipton railway station and when the train arrived at Hellifield the door to the outside of the train from his compartment was wide open. An inquest could not determine whether it was an accident or foul play.

== Sources ==
- Binns, D. (1981), Railways Around Skipton, Wyvern Publications, Skipton.
- Binns, D. (1982), The Little North Western Railway, Wyvern Publications, Skipton, ISBN 0-907941-01-X.

Preceding station	Historical railways	Following station
Gargrave	Midland Railway "Little" North Western Railway	Hellifield
