= Ted Mason =

Fell runner

Edward Thomas "Ted" Mason (born 30 January 1979) is a Yorkshire-born farmer best known for his accomplishments as a fell runner.

He grew up in Appletreewick near Grassington. He went to Burnsall V.A. Primary School, then Upper Wharfedale School in Threshfield. Upon leaving school he pursued a career as a farmer, gaining a Higher National Diploma in agriculture from Newton Rigg College, part of Askham Bryan College.

Mason is a member of the Wharfedale Harriers, the British Open Fell Runners Association (BOFRA) and the Fell Runners Association (FRA).

His fell running career began when he was ten years old, finishing last in a local race, and his first race win was at the age of nineteen at Beamsley Beacon. Mason's first championship race win was in 1999 at the BOFRA Hawkswick Dash. Turning at the summit, he was lying in fifth, but he quickly gained places on the descent going on to win in 11 minutes 38 seconds, 31 seconds ahead of second place.

Mason is most noted for his speed in descending, being cited by Alistair Dunn (BOFRA Champion 2006–11) as "an inspiration from the start of my fell running career. I still don't know anyone who can descend faster".

Mason was crowned BOFRA Champion in 2002 and 2003, and came close to regaining the title in 2011. It was taken to the last race at Wasdale Show. Mason was leading the championship going into the race, but a result of fourth meant a finish of second overall in the series. In 2012, he was again victorious in the championship, also winning in 2014 and 2015.

In 2011, Mason achieved a number of ambitions. On 20 August he won the race most local to him, the Burnsall Classic for the first time. This fell race is one of the oldest fell races, dating beyond 1870, with the first report of it appearing in the Craven Herald in 1888. Mason took a different route down the fell, going on to win by a twelve-second margin. Ten days later he would go on to win the crag race at Kilnsey Show also for the first time. It was his fifteenth attempt.

Mason has made a couple of television appearances, appearing on the title screens for Look North News and more recently on The Dales hosted by Ade Edmondson on ITV, where he was documented training for the Burnsall Classic.
