= Skipton Broughton Road Carriage sidings =

Train stabling point in Skipton, North Yorkshire

Skipton Broughton Carriage Sidings
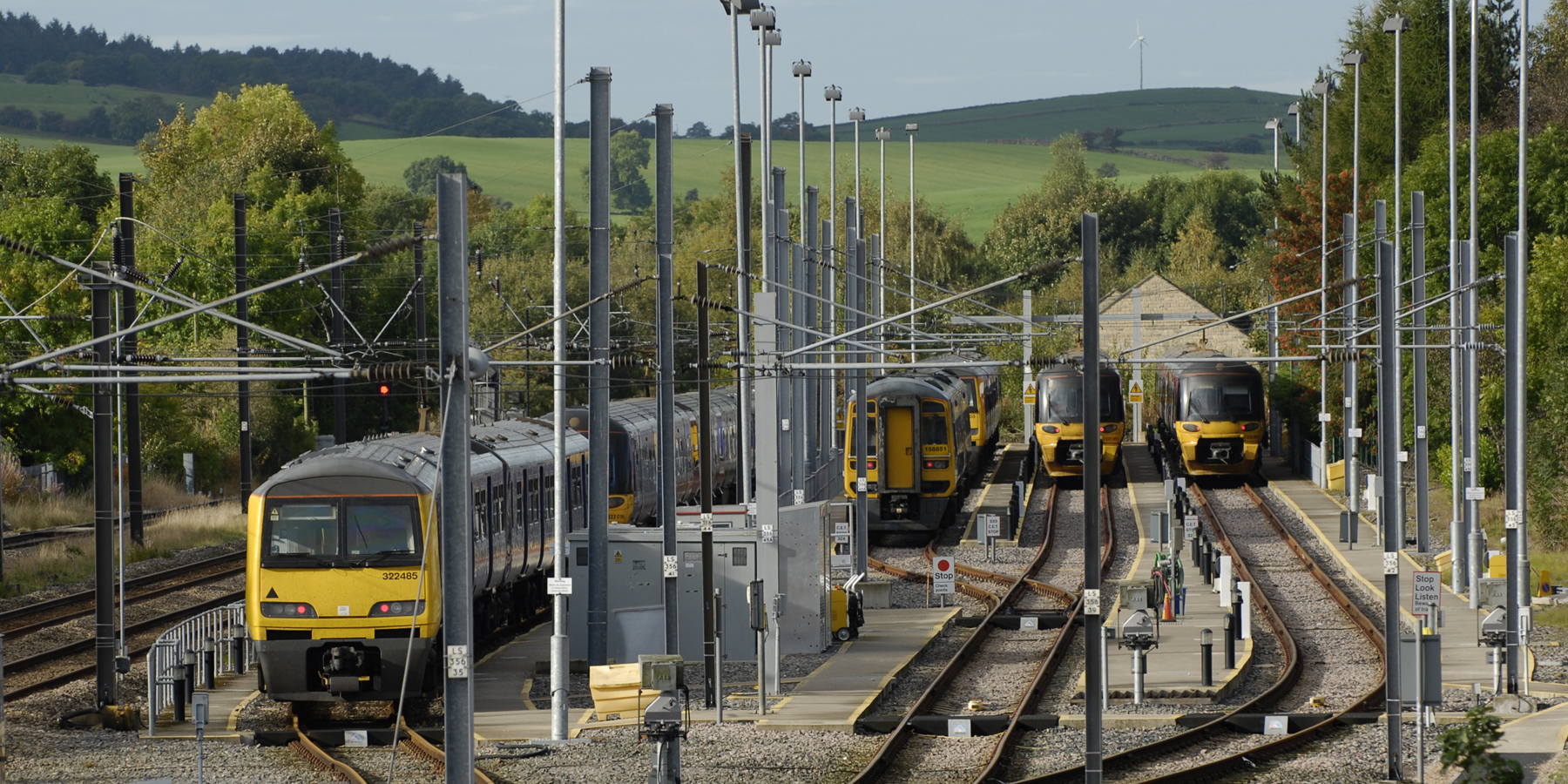
- Skipton Broughton Road Carriage Sidings

Location
- Location: North Yorkshire, England
- OS grid: SD9751

Characteristics
- Owner: Network Rail
- Operator: Northern Trains
- Type: DMU, EMU

Skipton Broughton Carriage Sidings are located in Skipton, North Yorkshire, England, on the Airedale Line just west of Skipton station. It derives its name from Broughton Road, which runs parallel to the facility. The sidings are located on the opposite side of the railway to where the former Skipton Engine shed was located, which closed in 1967.

Prior to the DMU/EMU sidings being opened, the site functioned as a Carriage & Wagon works for the area. It mostly serviced wagons on the Swinden Quarry to Hull and Leeds Hunslet workings, and often serviced wagons that had developed faults on the Airedale and the Settle and Carlisle Lines.

Originally there was a fan of three sidings just west of Skipton Station with a carriage washer before the sidings split off from the connecting line. This was changed to four sidings (with a full Controlled Emission Toilet (CET) discharge line) in 2012 after services had been strengthened on the Airedale Line. Class 322 EMUs were transferred from Scotrail to bolster peak time services in the Aire Valley. This resulted in a £3.6 million improvement in the siding space to allow overnight stabling of 14 units.

== Rolling Stock ==
Stabling is provided for Class 158 Sprinters and Class 331 and Class 333 EMUs.
