= St Peter's Church, Rylstone =

Coordinates: 54.0255°N 2.0447°W

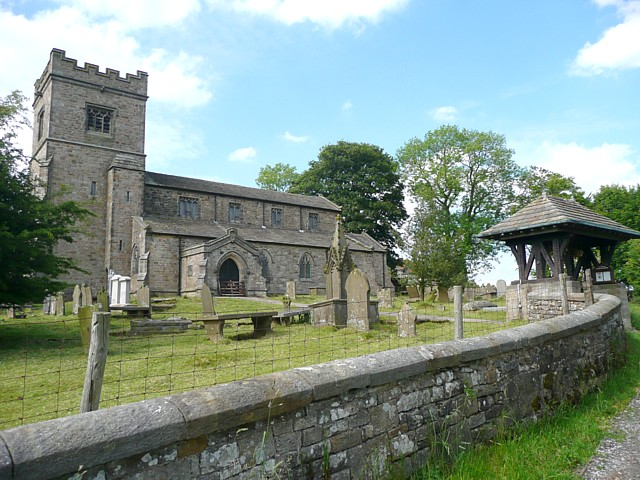
- St Peter's Church, Rylstone, from the south

- Location in North Yorkshire
- OS grid reference: SD 972,588
- Location: Rylstone, North Yorkshire
- Country: England
- Denomination: Anglican
- Website: St Peter, Rylstone

History
- Status: Parish church
- Dedication: Saint Peter

Architecture
- Functional status: Active
- Heritage designation: Grade II
- Designated: 10 September 1954
- Architect: E. G. Paley
- Architectural type: Church
- Style: Gothic Revival
- Completed: 1853

Specifications
- Materials: Gritstone, stone slate roofs

Administration
- Province: York
- Diocese: Leeds
- Archdeaconry: Craven
- Deanery: Skipton
- Parish: Rylstone

St Peter's Church is in the village of Rylstone, North Yorkshire, England. It is an active Anglican parish church in the deanery of Skipton, the archdeaconry of Craven, and the Diocese of Leeds. Its benefice is united with that of St Wilfrid, Burnsall. The church is recorded in the National Heritage List for England as a designated Grade II listed building.

== History ==
St Peter's was built in 1852–53 to a design by the Lancaster architect E. G. Paley, replacing an earlier church on the site. Its total cost was £1,700 (equivalent to £190,000 in 2025), of which between £1,000 and £1,100 was donated by Richard Waddilove.

== Architecture ==
=== Exterior ===
The church is constructed in gritstone and has a stone slate roof. Its plan consists of a four-bay nave with a clerestory and a chancel in one range, north and south aisles, a south porch, and a west tower. The tower is in three stages with diagonal buttresses, a southeast stair turret, and a moulded crenellated parapet. In the two lower stages are Perpendicular-style west windows, those in the bottom stage having three lights, and those in the middle stage two lights. On each side of the top stage is a flat-headed three-light bell opening. The clerestory windows are similar in style to the bell openings in the tower. The other windows are in Decorated style, those along the aisles having two lights and the east window five lights. The porch has benches on each side.

=== Interior ===
Inside the church the arcades are carried on octagonal pillars. The pulpit and font date from the time of the building of the church. In the church are memorials to two local benefactors. The two-manual organ was built in 1932 by Albert Keates. There is a ring of three bells that were cast in 1853 by Charles and George Mears of the Whitechapel Bell Foundry.

== Churchyard ==
The churchyard contains four war graves, of a Yorkshire Regiment officer and Royal Navy seaman of the First World War and a Royal Artillery soldier and airman of the Second World War.

== See also ==
- Listed buildings in Rylstone
- List of works by Sharpe and Paley
