= Threshfield Primary School =

School in Threshfield, North Yorkshire, England

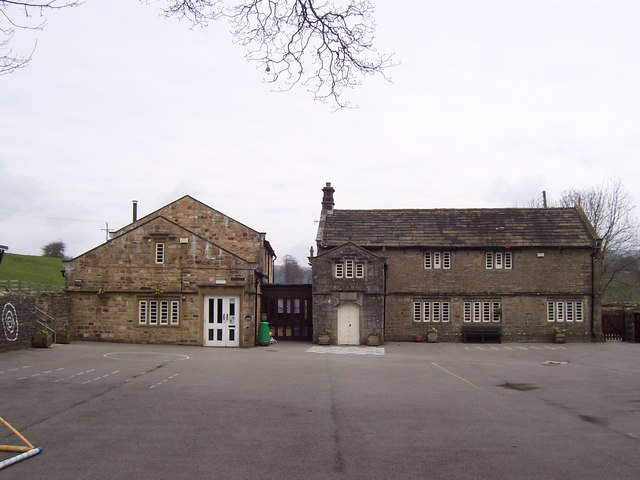
The school, in 2006

Threshfield Primary School is a state school in a historic building, in the village of Threshfield in North Yorkshire, in England.

A grammar school was founded in Threshfield in 1674, by Matthew Hewitt. The original building survives, having been altered in the mid or late 19th century. It has some similarities with the older Burnsall Primary School. In 1900, the building was the only one damaged by a minor local earthquake. The grammar school eventually closed, with the building since housing the local primary school. In 2011, an extension was opened, in a broadly similar style to the original building, the new space providing space for cookery lessons. The original building has been grade II listed since 1954.

The original school building is constructed of gritstone, with quoins, and a stone slate roof with moulded kneelers and gable coping. It has two storeys and is four bays wide, the left bay with a projecting two-storey gabled porch with three bulbous finials. The doorway has a chamfered quoined surround, the windows are mullioned, and over the ground floor openings is a continuous hood mould. The upper floor originally provided accommodation for the schoolmaster but it has been removed. A 17th-century fireplace is still visible at the former first-floor level.

== See also ==
- Listed buildings in Threshfield
