= St Margaret Clitherow's Church, Threshfield =

Church in Threshfield, North Yorkshire, England

Coordinates: 54.0702°N 2.0125°W

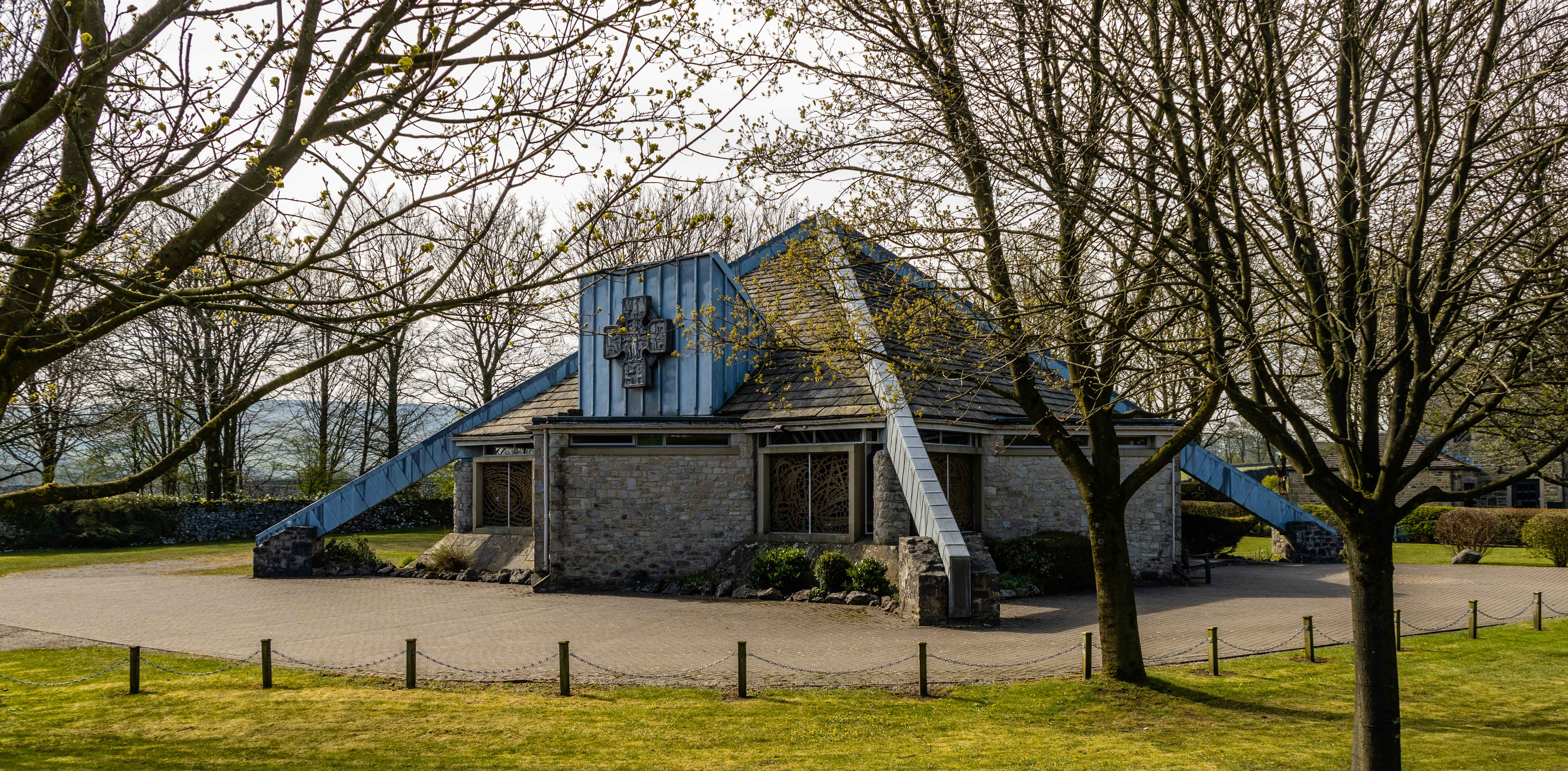
The church, in 2021

St Margaret Clitherow's Church is a Catholic church in Threshfield, a village in North Yorkshire, in England.

In the 1960s, the Catholic population around Grassington grew, and it was decided to construct a church in the neighbouring village of Threshfield. A design was drawn up by Jack Langtry-Langton, but it was rejected by the diocese, and the architect was reluctant to make the changes the diocese wanted. Instead, Jack's son, Peter Langtry-Langton, drew up a new design, inspired by a drawing he had seen of a church in Africa, constructed of branches and palm leaves. The church was constructed between 1972 and 1973, and was grade II listed in 2012.

The church is built of limestone with zinc-clad concrete beams and a roof of stone slates. The plan is of two intersecting squares, with four beams forming flying buttresses. Three of the sides have triangular projections, and the fourth has a meeting room. On one of the faces is a large lead Celtic cross with figurative carving, which was designed by John Ashworth and John Loker. Inside, there are semicircular wooden pews, with a folding partition screen behind. There are two large stained glass windows, designed by Jane Duff.

== See also ==
- Listed buildings in Threshfield
