= Norton Tower =

Building in Rylstone, North Yorkshire, England

Coordinates: 54.0093°N 2.0381°W

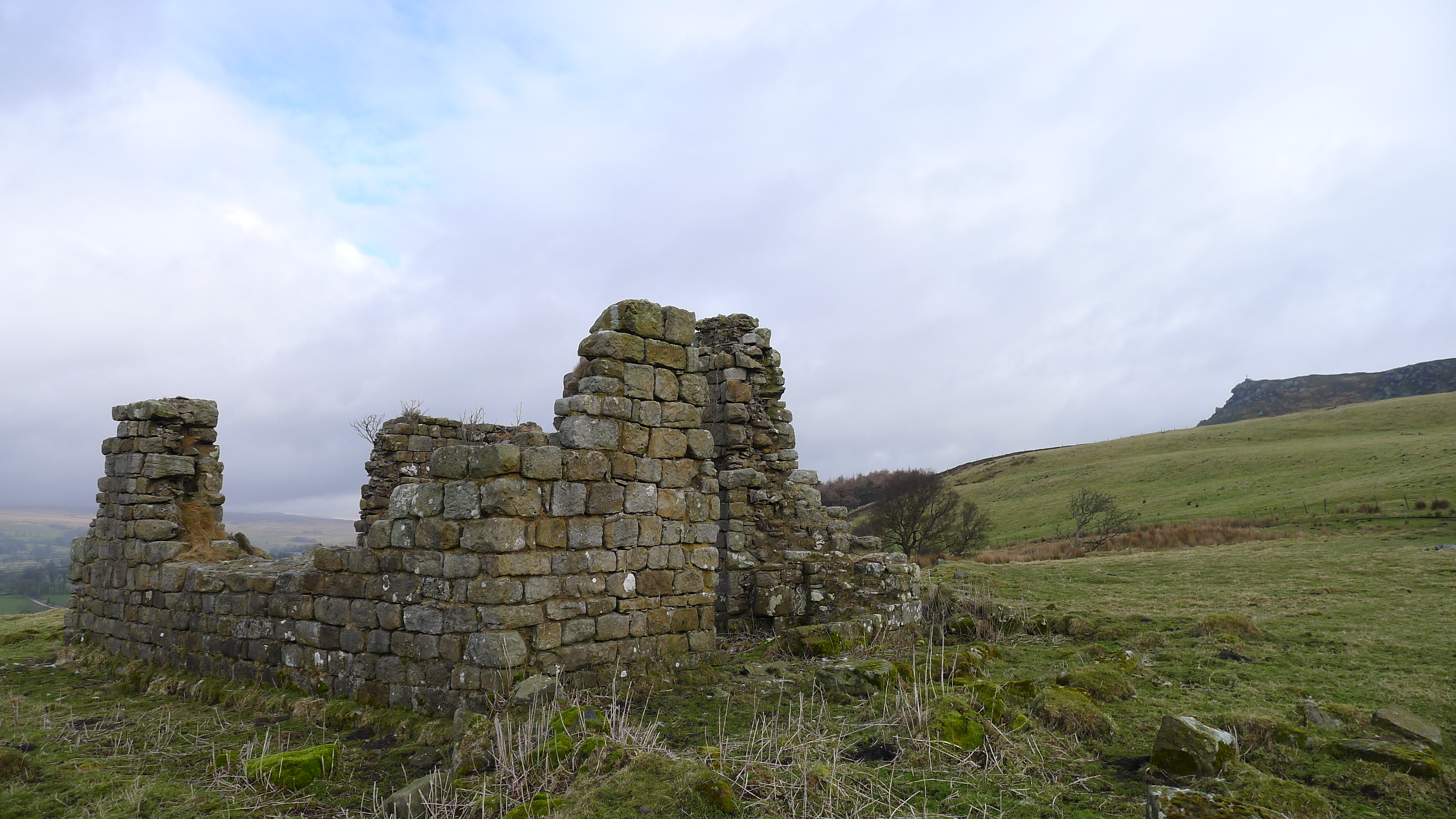
The ruins, in 2015

Norton Tower is a ruined building near Rylstone, a village in North Yorkshire, in England.

The building was constructed as a hunting lodge with space for banqueting, probably in about 1540. It was built for the Norton family of Norton Conyers, and was intended to assert their rights to hunt in the area, over those of the rival Clifford family. The Nortons were involved in the Rising of the North in 1569, following which their lands were seized, and given to the Cliffords, who demolished the tower. In 1807, William Wordsworth referred to the tower in his poem "The White Doe of Rylstone". The ruins of the tower were grade II listed in 1969, but fell into further disrepair. Limited conservation work was conducted in 1981, followed by a more thorough consolidation in 2017.

The ruined tower is built of gritstone, with a rectangular plan, approximately 10 metres by 15 metres. The corners remain, and are about 3 metres (9.8 ft) in height. The original entrance was probably on the south side, while on the east side, remains of a fireplace and staircase are visible.

== See also ==
- Listed buildings in Rylstone
