= Listed buildings in Rylstone =

Rylstone is a civil parish in the county of North Yorkshire, England. It contains 16 listed buildings that are recorded in the National Heritage List for England. All the listed buildings are designated at Grade II, the lowest of the three grades, which is applied to "buildings of national importance and special interest". The parish contains the village of Rylstone and the surrounding countryside. Most of the listed buildings are houses, farmhouses, and associated structures, and the others include a ruined tower, a church and a guide stone.

== Buildings ==
Name and location	Photograph	Date	Notes
Norton Tower; 54.00933°N 2.03810°W		16th century (probable)	The remains of a tower in gritstone, with an approximately square plan. The corners remain, and are about 3 metres (9.8 ft) in height.
Kennels; 54.02293°N 2.05120°W	—	17th century	The house is in gritstone with quoins and a stone slate roof. There are two storeys and three bays. On the front is a low two-storey porch with a coped gable and bulbous kneelers. It contains a square-headed doorway with a chamfered quoined surround, above which is a recessed plaque with initials and a date, and a small chamfered window, and in the right return is a blocked 17th-century doorway. The windows are recessed and mullioned, and on the ground floor is a continuous hood mould.
Manor Cottage; 54.02432°N 2.04750°W	—	Mid-17th century	The house is in stone with quoins, a stone slate roof, two storeys and three bays. The doorway on the left has a plain surround, and the windows are mullioned, on the ground floor with four lights, and above with two lights.
Yew Tree Farmhouse; 54.02410°N 2.04985°W	—	1670	The farmhouse is in gritstone, with quoins, a string course, and a stone slate roof. There are two storeys and two bays. The doorway has a moulded quoined surround, the moulding carried over the triangular doorhead. The lintel has a recessed inscribed and dated plaque. Throughout, there are recessed chamfered mullion windows.
Scale House; 54.00570°N 2.04636°W	—	c. 1700	The house, which was extended in 1866 and later, is in grey gritstone, with quoins and a stone slate roof. It consists of a range of two storeys and five bays with an M-shaped roof, three three-storey towers on the south and west sides with balustraded parapets and ball finials, a two-storey three-bay service and stair wing on the west, and a two-storey service extension to the north. On the left return is a portico with Tuscan columns, above which is a parapet with vase balusters, and a central circular opening in a scrolled surround with obelisk finials.
Highfleets Farmhouse; 54.03990°N 2.05580°W	—	Late 17th to early 18th century	A house, and a byre with a hayloft, now incorporated into the house. It is in grey gritstone, with quoins, and a stone slate roof with moulded kneelers and gable copings. There are two storeys, the house has two bays, and the former farm building to the left has one bay. The doorway has a chamfered quoined surround, and the windows are recessed and chamfered with mullions. On the left bay are external steps with a blocked dog kennel entrance below, leading up to a doorway with a small window to the right.
Gates, piers and walls, Scale House; 54.00391°N 2.04637°W	—	Early 18th century	The gateway was moved to its present site in about 1860. The gate piers are in stone and about 2 metres (6 ft 7 in) in height. Each pier has recessed panels on each face, a cornice and a ball finial. The flanking walls are curved, about 1 metre (3 ft 3 in) in height, and have ridged coping. The gates are in wrought iron, and have two leaves, bars, and dog bars with scroll motifs.
High Bucker farmhouse, barn and stable 54.05595°N 2.07866°W		Mid-18th century	The buildings are in gritstone with quoins and stone slate roofs. The house has two storeys and two bays, to the right is a single-bay former stable range, and to the left is a three-bay barn. The doorway has a plain surround, and the windows are mullioned with three lights. The stable has a cart entrance with a quoined left jamb. On the barn is a projecting porch and a doorway with quoined jambs. At the rear of the house is a tall stair window, and on the right return are external steps.
Lodge Cottage, barn and stables 54.02417°N 2.04908°W	—	Mid-18th century	Originally a service block to Rylstone Lodge, with an attached barn and stable range, it is in gritstone with quoins and a stone slate roof. The house has two storeys, two bays and a rear wing, to the left is a lower three-bay barn, with one bay projecting as a two-storey two-bay stable wing. The doorway has a plain surround, and the windows are mullioned. The barn has a cart entrance, double doors with quoined jambss, and pigeon holes above. On the projecting wing is a doorway with a fanlight, imposts and a keystone, and in the gable end are five tiers of pigeon holes.
Lodge Farmhouse and barn 54.02424°N 2.04868°W	—	Mid to late 18th century	The farmhouse and barn are in gritstone, with quoins, and a stone slate roof with a shaped kneeler and gable coping to the right. There are two storeys, the house has two bays, and to the right is a lower three-bay barn. The house has a central doorway with a cornice, and the windows are mullioned. The barn has a central cart entrance and a doorway to the left, both with quoined jambs, and a doorway to the right with tie-stone jambs and a fanlight. On the upper floor is a blocked loading doorway.
Rylstone Lodge; 54.02421°N 2.04884°W	—	Mid to late 18th century	The house is in gritstone with rusticated quoins and a stone slate roof. There are two storeys and three bays. The doorway has a plain surround and a cornice, and the windows are sashes with slightly projecting surrounds.
Coach house, Rylstone House; 54.02328°N 2.04879°W	—	c. 1800	The coach house and stables, later converted for residential use, are in stone with hipped stone slate roofs. In the centre is a projecting bay with two storeys, containing a segmental-headed coach entrance, now filled by a window. Above it is a circular window, and on the roof is a weathervane. It is flanked by single-storey three-bay wings, each containing a central round-arched doorway with a blocked fanlight and sash windows.
Rylstone House; 54.02333°N 2.04932°W	—	Early to mid-19th century	The house is in grey gritstone, with rusticated quoins, a floor band, a moulded eaves cornice with a blocking course and a central plaque, and a grey slate roof with coped gables. There are two storeys and three bays. The central doorway has a fanlight, pilasters, dosserets with paterae, and an open pediment. The windows are sashes, with three lights on the ground floor and a single-light above.
Gateway and front wall, Rylstone House; 54.02358°N 2.04904°W	—	Mid-19th century	The gates, piers and railings are in cast and wrought iron. The piers are in openwork with quatrefoil motifs in panels, and the double gates are ramped and have bars and dog bars. Low walls in gritstone with railings curve away from the gates, and on the west side run for about 20 metres (66 ft) along the boundary of the grounds.
St Peter's Church; 54.02555°N 2.04466°W		1852–53	The church, designed by E. G. Paley, is built in gritstone and has a stone slate roof. It consists of a nave with a clerestory, north and south aisles, a south porch, a chancel and a west tower. The tower has three stages, diagonal buttresses, a stair turret to the southeast, west windows, three-light bell openings, and a moulded embattled parapet.
Guide stone 54.02353°N 2.04823°W		1853 (probable)	The guide stone at the junction of Raikes Lane with the B6265 road is in gritstone, and about 50 centimetres (20 in) in height. It has a triangular section and a ridged top. On each face are pointing hands, on the left face is inscribed "SKIPTON" and "TRESHFIELD", and on the right face is "HETTON".
