= Listed buildings in Cracoe =

Cracoe is a civil parish in the county of North Yorkshire, England. It contains eight listed buildings that are recorded in the National Heritage List for England. All the listed buildings are designated at Grade II, the lowest of the three grades, which is applied to "buildings of national importance and special interest". The parish contains the village of Cracoe and the surrounding area. All the listed buildings are in the village, and consist of houses, farmhouses and farm buildings.

== Buildings ==
Name and location	Photograph	Date	Notes
Toppan House; 54.03769°N 2.03449°W	—	1622	A house with two cottages added probably in the 18th century and later combined into a house. They are in gritstone with quoins and stone slate roofs, and two storeys. The house has three bays. The central doorway of the original house has a quoined surround with a moulded chamfer, an initialled and dated lintel, and a triangular head. The windows are recessed with chamfered mullions, those in the found floor under a continuous hood mould stepped up over the doorway. The cottages have one bay each and they contain 20th-century doors and windows.
Coxon's Farmhouse and barns 54.03672°N 2.03686°W	—	17th century	The farmhouse, which was refronted in the 19th century, has two storeys and three bays, with a projecting wing at the front and a rear wing. On the front are two porches, one in the angle with the wing, supported on a Tuscan column, and the windows are sashes. In the rear wing are two three-light chamfered and mullioned windows. To the right is a byre with external steps. To the left is a five-bay barn dating from the 18th century, with quoins. It has a tall porch, doors with quoined jambs, and a square loading door.
The Cottage; 54.03626°N 2.03632°W	—	17th century	A house in gritstone with quoins and a stone slate roof. There are two storeys and two bays. The doorway on the left has a chamfered quoined surround, and the windows have flat-faced mullions.
Baxter's Fold; 54.03725°N 2.03587°W	—	Mid to late 17th century	A house and attached barn in gritstone, with quoins and a stone slate roof. The house has two storeys and two bays. There are two doorways, the left with a chamfered quoined surround and a shallow triangular head, the right with a projecting plain surround and a triangular pediment. The windows are sashes, those in the upper floor with mullions. The barn has three bays, and contains doorways with chamfered quoined surrounds, one with a basket arch, and another with a triangular head. The cart entrance has quoined jambs, and there are three vents.
Cracoe House; 54.03840°N 2.03263°W		Early 18th century	The house is in gritstone, with quoins, a floor band, a moulded eaves cornice, and a stone slate roof. There are two storeys and five bays, and a recessed bay on the left. In the centre of the main range is a doorway with an eared architrave and a segmental pediment. The windows are sashes in eared architraves. The left bay contains a doorway in an arched recess with a keystone, and above is a cross window.
Ings House; 54.03708°N 2.03648°W	—	Early to mid 18th century	The house is rendered and has a stone slate roof. There are two storeys and three bays. In the centre is a gabled porch, above it is a single-light window, and the other windows have three-lights with flat-faced mullions.
Shiers Farmhouse; 54.04144°N 2.02374°W	—	Mid to late 18th century	The farmhouse is in stone with quoins and a stone slate roof. There are two storeys, two bays and a rear outshut. In the centre is a doorway in a round-arched surround with a fanlight and a keystone. The windows have flat-faced mullions, those at the front with three stepped lights.
Barn at The Courtyard; 54.03584°N 2.03864°W	—	Mid to late 18th century	The barn is in grey gritstone with quoins and a stone slate roof. There is a single storey and three bays, the outer bays with outshuts, forming a deeply recessed cart entrance. To the left is a doorway with a chamfered quoined surround, and within the porch is a doorway with a chamfered quoined surround.
