= Listed buildings in Threshfield =

Threshfield is a civil parish in the county of North Yorkshire, England. It contains 18 listed buildings that are recorded in the National Heritage List for England. All the listed buildings are designated at Grade II, the lowest of the three grades, which is applied to "buildings of national importance and special interest". The parish contains the village of Threshfield, the hamlet of Skirethorns, and the surrounding countryside. Most of the listed buildings are houses, cottages, farmhouses and farm buildings, and the others include a set of stocks, a school, a guide stone, a bridge, a telephone kiosk and a church.

== Buildings ==
Name and location	Photograph	Date	Notes
The Old Hall; 54.06799°N 2.01832°W	—	16th century	The remains of a house, later used as an outbuilding, in gritstone, with quoins and a stone slate roof. There is a single storey and a square plan. The doorway has a deeply chamfered quoined surround and a shallow Tudor arch. The windows have round-headed lights, moulded mullions, and deeply cut spandrels.
Ladywell Cottage; 54.07025°N 2.00485°W		Early to mid-17th century	The cottage is in gritstone, with quoins, and a Welsh slate roof with kneelers and gable coping on the right. There are two storeys and an attic, two bays, and a single-storey rear extension. The doorway is in the extension, and most of the windows are mullioned with hood moulds.
Lane House; 54.06942°N 2.04125°W	—	Early to mid-17th century	The house is in gritstone with quoins and a stone slate roof. There are two storeys and two bays. The doorway has a chamfered quoined surround with a slightly cambered head under a square chamfer. The windows vary, some with chamfered surrounds.
Bell Bank; 54.07090°N 2.03412°W	—	17th century	The house is in whitewashed stone with quoins and a stone slate roof. There are two storeys and three bays. On the front are paired doorways with chamfered surrounds, the right with a flat slab head, and the windows are mullioned.
Stocks; 54.06804°N 2.01731°W		17th century	The stocks have gritstone shafts and wooden footboards. The shafts have a square section, they are about 80 centimetres (31 in) in height, and have grooves on the inner faces.
1, 2 and 3 Main Street; 54.06796°N 2.01698°W		1651	A row of three houses, the left house the oldest, and the others dating from the mid-18th century and the late 19th century. They are in gritstone, with quoins, stone gutter brackets, and a stone slate roof. There are two storeys and five bays. The left house has a doorway with a quoined surround, and an arched head with the date and initials. To the left are mullioned windows, and further to the left is a blocked segmental arch with an inserted sash window, and another sash window above. The other two houses have doorways with plain surrounds and mullioned windows.
Manor House Barn; 54.06755°N 2.01742°W	—	1661	The barn is in gritstone with quoins and a stone slate roof. There are four bays, the left bay recessed, and the ends have an upper storey. In the third bay is a segmental cart entrance with quoined jambs. The left bay contains a byre door with quoined jambs in a porch formed by the landing of external steps leading to a doorway with chamfered quoined jambs. On the left is a square opening under a two-light mullioned window. The right return has three doors with triangular heads, one lintel with the date and the other with initials.
Threshfield School; 54.06665°N 2.00536°W		1674	A grammar school, later a primary school, in gritstone, with quoins, and a stone slate roof with moulded kneelers and gable coping. There are two storeys and four bays, the left bay with a projecting two-storey gabled porch with three bulbous finials. The doorway has a chamfered quoined surround, the windows are mullioned, and over the ground floor openings is a continuous hood mould.
The Manor House; 54.06776°N 2.01716°W		Late 17th century	The house, which has been altered, is in gritstone, with quoins, two storeys and fronts of three bays. On the south front, is a central multistoried porch, containing a doorway with moulded jambs and a triangular head. The oversailing upper floor contains a square recess and a mullioned and transomed window, above which is a wheel window, two moulded courses, and a small segmental window in the gable. Elsewhere, there are sash windows.
Toft House; 54.06863°N 2.01655°W		Late 17th century	The house is in gritstone, with quoins, and a stone slate roof with shaped kneelers and gable coping. There are two storeys and three bays, the left bay containing a two-storey gabled porch. On the porch is a doorway and to the right is another doorway, both with tie-stone jambs, and the windows are mullioned.
Park Grange Farmhouse; 54.06817°N 2.01663°W	—	1680	The house is in gritstone with quoins and a stone slate roof. It has two storeys and three bays, The doorway has a moulded surround and a curved head with initials and part of a date. There are recessed chamfered mullion windows throughout, and a continuous hood mould over the ground floor openings.
Moss House and outbuilding 54.07038°N 2.03603°W	—	Mid-18th century	The farmhouse and attached outbuilding are in gritstone with a stone slate roof. There are two storeys, the house has two bays, and the outbuilding is to the left. The house has a doorway with a chamfered quoined surround and a single-slab hood. The windows are mullioned, and on the outbuilding is a doorway with a plain surround.
Bridge End Farmhouse; 54.06975°N 2.00480°W		Mid to late 18th century	The house is in stone with quoins and a stone slate roof. There are two storeys, three bays on the front, the left bay projecting as a narrow wing, and two bays on the right return. The doorway has a plain surround, and the windows are mullioned, those in the ground floor of the main range in slightly moulded architraves.
Netherside Hall; 54.08057°N 2.02642°W	—	1820–22	A country house, later a school, it is in stone and has a grey slate roof with kneelers and tall pyramidal finials. The main block has two storeys and an attic, and fronts of five and four bays. The outer bays project slightly and are gabled, and in the centre is a single-storey porch with three round arches, a coped parapet, and a circular carved plaque, with a scroll and pyramid finials. The windows are mullioned and transomed. To the left is a recessed range with two storeys and two long bays, containing a doorway with a shallow triangular head and a hood mould. At the rear, the house has a basement, and a three-storey canted bay window.
Guide stone 54.07099°N 2.01974°W		Early to mid-19th century	The guide stone at the junction of Skythornes Lane and the B6160 road is in gritstone. It has a triangular section, and is about 60 centimetres (24 in) in height. The left face is inscribed "SKIRETHORNS", "MALHAM" and "SETTLE" and on the right face are inscribed "KETTLEWELL" and "THRESHFIELD" with two pointing hands.
Threshfield Bridge; 54.06665°N 2.01837°W		Early to mid-19th century	The bridge carries the B6265 road over a stream. It is in rusticated stone, and consists of a single arch of massive voussoirs and a keystone. The bridge is flanked by pilasters carried up as bollards to the parapet, and at each end are cylindrical bollards.
Telephone kiosk 54.06770°N 2.01745°W		1935	The telephone kiosk at a road junction is of the K6 type designed by Giles Gilbert Scott. Constructed in cast iron with a square plan and a dome, it has three unperforated crowns in the top panels.
St Margaret Clitherow's Church; 54.07030°N 2.01252°W		1972–73	The church is in limestone with zinc-clad concrete beams and a roof of stone slates. The plan is of two intersecting squares, with four beams forming flying buttresses. Three of the sides have triangular projections, and the fourth has a meeting room. On one of the faces is a large Celtic cross with figurative carving.
