= Hellifield railway station =

Railway station in North Yorkshire, England

Hellifield
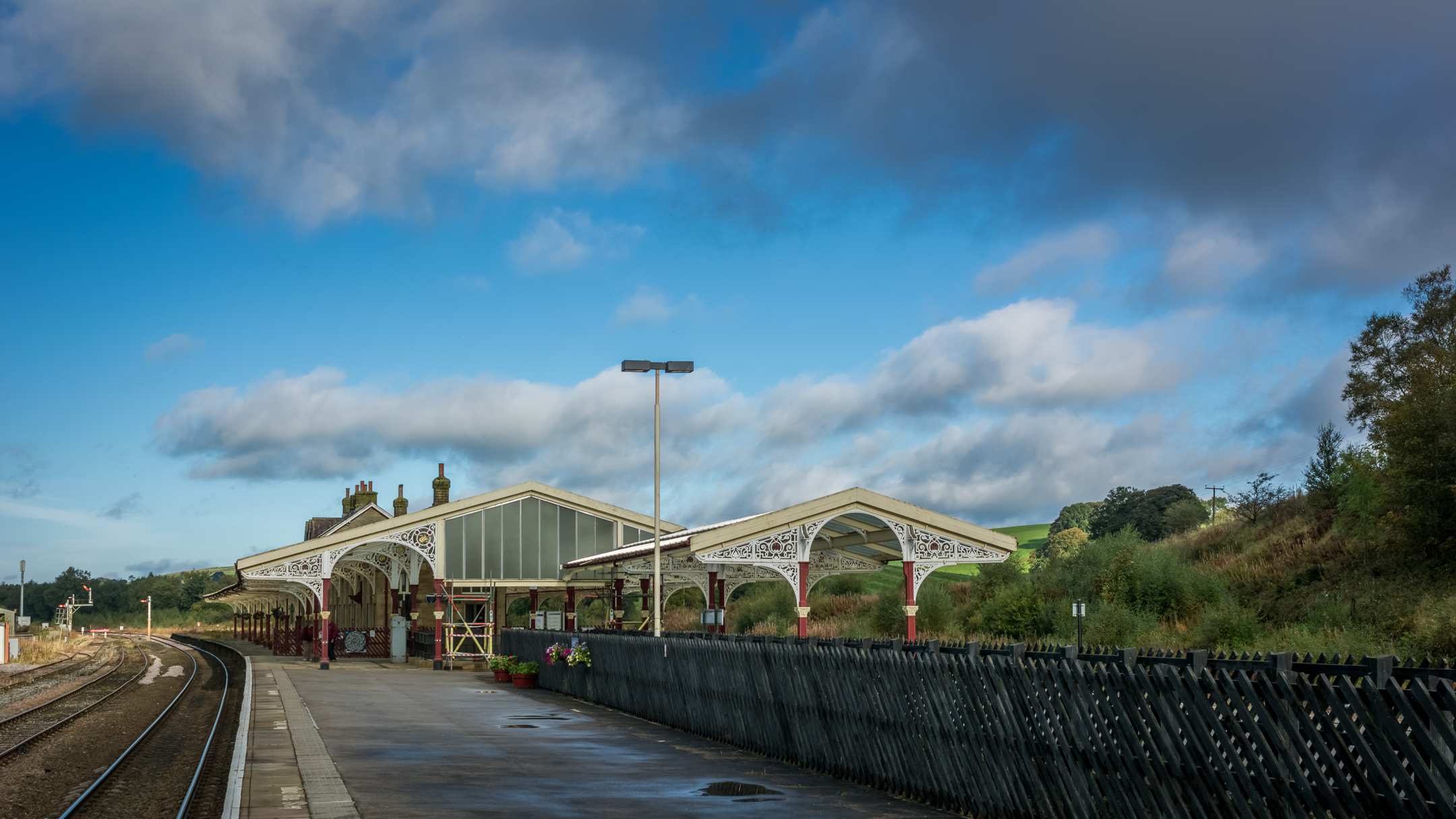

General information
- Location: Hellifield, North Yorkshire; England
- Coordinates: 54°00′38″N 2°13′37″W
- Grid reference: SD851572
- Owner: Network Rail
- Manager: Northern Trains
- Platforms: 4, 2 disused
- Tracks: 5

Other information
- Station code: HLD
- Classification: DfT category F2

History
- Original company: "Little" North Western Railway
- Pre-grouping: Midland Railway
- Post-grouping: London, Midland and Scottish Railway, British Rail (London Midland Region)

Key dates
- 30 July 1849: Opened
- 1 June 1880: Resited

Passengers
- 2021/22: ▲28,304
- 2022/23: ▼27,512
- 2023/24: ▲29,030
- 2024/25: ▲42,272
- 2025/26: ▲61,484
- Interchange: 880

Listed Building – Grade II
- Feature: Original Midland Railway station building
- Designated: 7 April 1977
- Reference no.: 1131702
Location
- Location within North Yorkshire
Notes
- Passenger statistics from the Office of Rail and Road

Hellifield is a junction railway station on the Bentham Line, which runs between Leeds and Morecambe via Skipton, as well as being the northern terminus of the Ribble Valley line. The station, situated 36 miles 17 chains (58.3 km) north-west of Leeds, serves the village of Hellifield, in North Yorkshire, England. It is owned by Network Rail and managed by Northern Trains.

== History ==
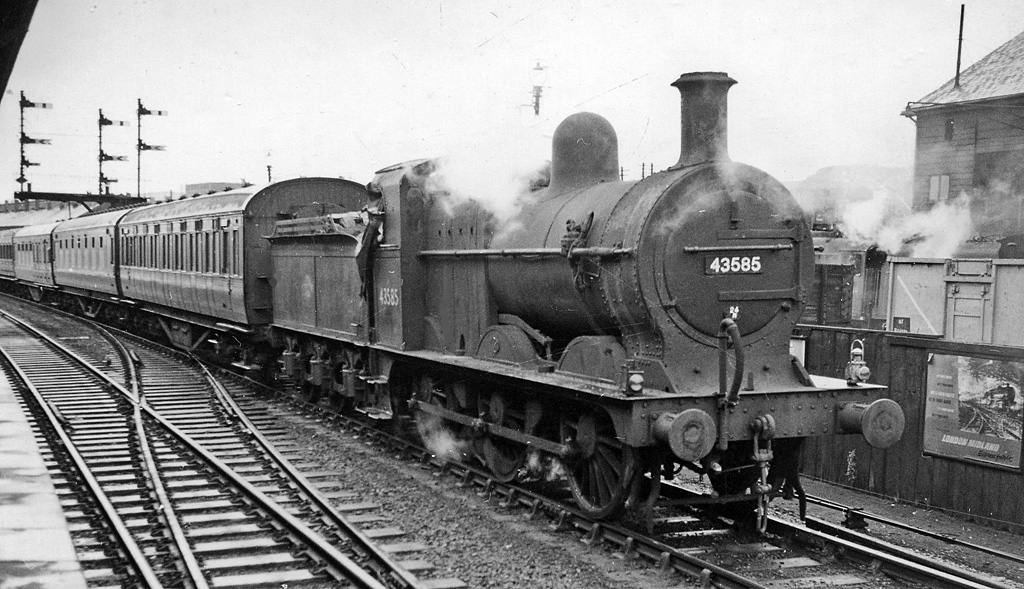
The station in June 1959

The first Hellifield railway station was opened by the "Little" North Western Railway in 1849. It was a modest structure, similar to those at Gargrave and Long Preston and sited 1/4 mile (0.4 km) to the south of the present one.

A much larger replacement (the current station) was built by the Midland Railway to the designs of architect Charles Trubshaw and opened on 1 June 1880; it lay immediately to the north of the junction of the line from Leeds and the newly completed Lancashire & Yorkshire Railway route from Blackburn via Clitheroe. It soon became a busy junction, as it was now located on the Midland Railway's main line from London St Pancras to Scotland, with trains going to Clitheroe, Skipton, Leeds, Blackburn, Settle, Carlisle, Manchester Victoria and Morecambe

It was also the location of a busy locomotive depot and a large goods yard.

The line from Blackburn had its local passenger service withdrawn on 10 September 1962, but it remains open for goods traffic and periodic diversions when the West Coast Main Line is closed north of Preston for engineering work. The adjacent locomotive shed closed the following year and local trains from the station to Carlisle ended in May 1970, although it continued to be served by expresses to and from Glasgow Central until 1975. Thereafter it was downgraded to unstaffed halt status and served only by stopping trains between Leeds and Morecambe.

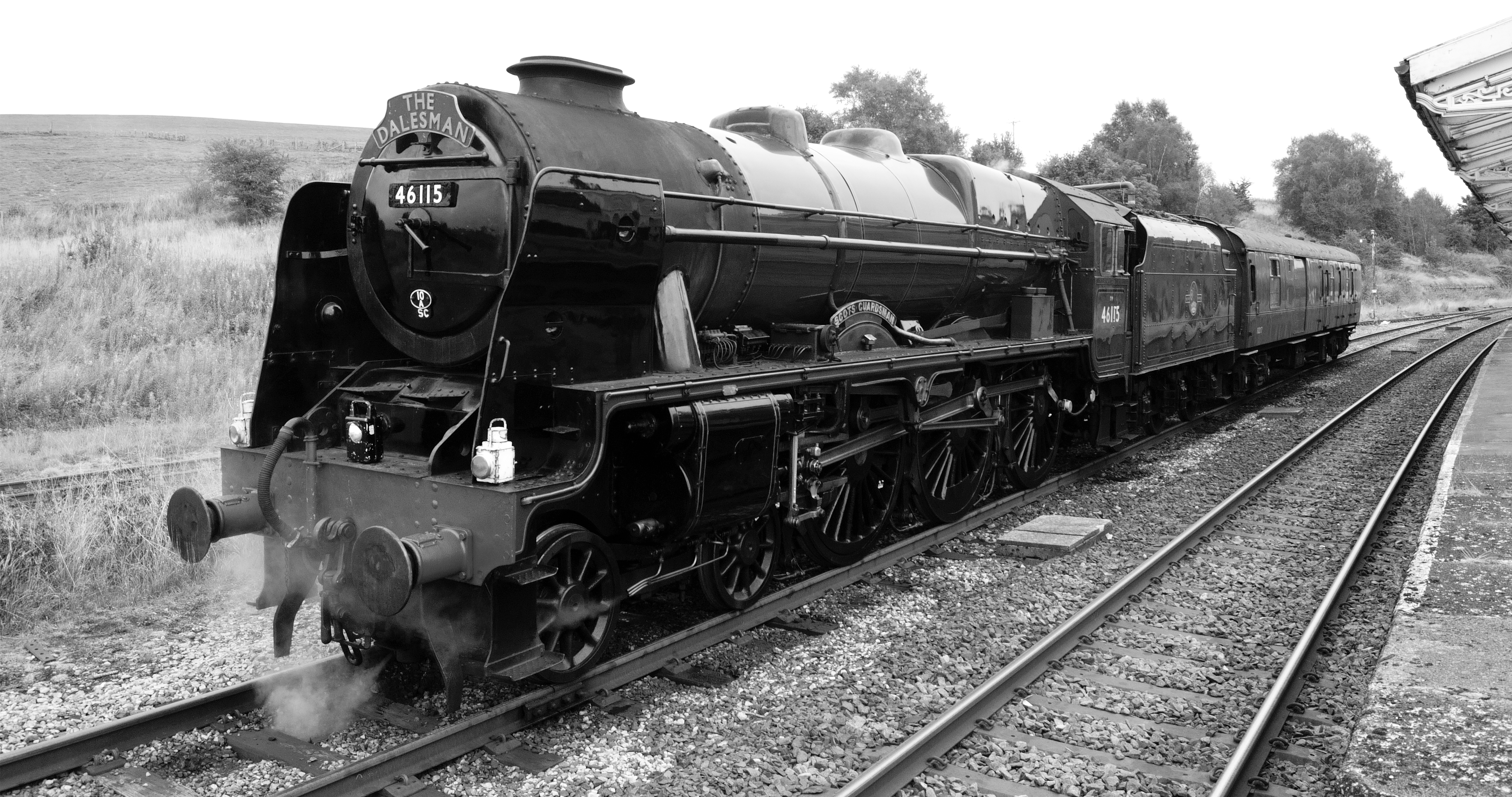
Hi-key monochrome of 46115 Scots Guardsman with The Dalesman at Hellifield, in preparation for the Settle – Carlisle run, September 2021

In April 1977, the main station building was designated as a Grade II listed building.

By the late 1980s, the main buildings and canopies were in very poor condition and under threat of demolition; following a £500,000 cash injection from British Rail, in conjunction with English Heritage and the Railway Heritage Trust, they were refurbished and returned to private commercial use. Trains to and from Carlisle also started calling again in May 1995 to further encourage use of the station and its newly restored amenities.

Between 2005 and 2008, the station was used as the operating base for Kingfisher Railtours' Dalesman steam-hauled charter trains over the Settle-Carlisle Line. Facilities on offer to the travelling public at the station include the Long Drag cafe & gift shop and a heritage room used to exhibit items and photographs connected to the Settle-Carlisle route.

The station is also still used by special trains and steam-hauled railway tours as a water stop and traction changeover point. It has also undergone further structural refurbishment in the summer of 2013, with Network Rail carrying out £500,000 of work on the Grade II listed buildings to repair/replace the glazing and repaint the canopies.

=== Accidents and incidents ===
- 19 December 1933: A goods brake van ran away from Hellifield South Junction while being shunted and collided head-on with an oncoming freight train, killing the driver and fireman and injuring the guard. The shunter, the guard of the train being shunted and the signaller at the south junction box were all found partially responsible. The lack of Catch points on the steep gradient was also highlighted in the report.
- 22 December 1955: The 21:15 express train from St. Pancras to Glasgow collided with the rear of the 21:05 express to Edinburgh, which was stationary at the station. The collision was caused by South Junction signalman Thomas B. Robinson, when he failed to reset a key signal lever (no. 45), allowing the Glasgow train to receive clear signals into an occupied platform. Though the train was braking, it still struck the Edinburgh train at around 25–30 mph (40–48 km/h), resulting in significant damage to the rear brake vans and a sleeping car. Fortunately, only two passengers and three railway staff were injured, with just one requiring hospitalisation. The inquiry revealed that the signalman had a history of neglecting regulations and occasionally allowed a booking boy to operate levers, which was against the rules. The driver of the Glasgow train also appeared to rely too heavily on distant signals and missed key home signals. The accident highlighted the need for stricter supervision, adherence to procedures, and the value of modern signalling controls, which were installed shortly after the incident.

== Facilities ==
The station has full step-free access, via a subway with inclined ramp from the main entrance. Train running information can be obtained from timetable posters, by telephone, or from digital PIS screens; the latter were installed as part of a rolling station upgrade programme by the train operator Arriva Rail North.

The last remaining signal box at the station (there were three until 1966) is one of only two manual boxes left in operation between Leeds and Carnforth (the other being at Settle Junction). It acts as the 'fringe' box to the Leeds workstation of York ROC in the Skipton direction, as well as controlling the junction and a pair of goods loops that are used to help regulate the increasingly levels of freight traffic on the Carlisle, Leeds and Blackburn lines.

== Services ==
Northern Trains operates regular services to Leeds, Lancaster and Carlisle:

- Southbound, there are sixteen services on weekdays and seventeen on Saturdays (of which one runs only to Skipton)
- Northbound, there are eight trains each to Lancaster and to Carlisle plus one evening service to Ribblehead; these run about every two hours. Five of the Lancaster trains run through to Morecambe.

On Sundays, there are six trains to Carlisle, five to Morecambe and eleven to Leeds, one of which continues to Nottingham.

Also on Sundays in the summer, a train operated from Blackpool North, Preston and Blackburn and along the Ribble Valley Line via Clitheroe to Hellifield and onwards towards Carlisle in the summer (this terminated/started here in the winter but with an onward connection north). This service, DalesRail, was operated by Northern Trains but ceased in December 2022. There are plans for more services from Clitheroe, with a twice-each-way Saturday service to/from there (and Manchester Victoria) having started in June 2024. The Ribble Valley Rail group is campaigning for this route to be reopened.

Preceding station	National Rail	Following station
Gargrave towards Leeds	Northern Trains; Leeds–Morecambe line	Long Preston towards Morecambe
Gargrave towards Leeds	Northern Trains; Settle and Carlisle Line	Long Preston towards Carlisle via Settle
Clitheroe towards Rochdale	Northern Trains; Ribble Valley line Limited service – Saturdays only	Settle towards Ribblehead
	Historical railways	
Newsholme	Lancashire and Yorkshire Railway; Ribble Valley line	Terminus
Bell Busk	Midland Railway "Little" North Western Railway	Long Preston

== See also ==
- Listed buildings in Hellifield
