= Upper Wharfedale School =

Secondary school in North Yorkshire, England

Coordinates: 54.0712°N 2.0117°W

Location
- Wharfeside Avenue; Threshfield; North Yorkshire, BD23 5BS; England

Information
- Type: Community school
- Established: 1955
- Local authority: North Yorkshire Council
- Department for Education URN: 121690 Tables
- Ofsted: Reports
- Headteacher: I. Chapman
- Gender: Coeducational
- Age: 11 to 16
- Enrolment: 331 as of May 2022
- Website: https://www.uws.n-yorks.sch.uk/

Upper Wharfedale School is a coeducational secondary school located in Threshfield, North Yorkshire, England. The school is named after Wharfedale, one of the Yorkshire Dales in which the school is located.

It is a non-selective community school administered by North Yorkshire Council, with grammar schools also operating in the same catchment area.

Upper Wharfedale School offers GCSEs and BTECs as programmes of study for pupils. The school has also previously gained specialist status as a Sports College.

== History ==
The school was established in 1955.

== Accomplishments ==
In July 2026, the school's status as School of Sanctuary was renewed, after It had become the first in the district to receive this accolade in 2019.

== Notable former pupils ==
- Ted Mason, fell runner
- Andrew Triggs Hodge, rower
