= Cracoe =

Village in North Yorkshire, England

Coordinates: 54°01′N 2°03′W

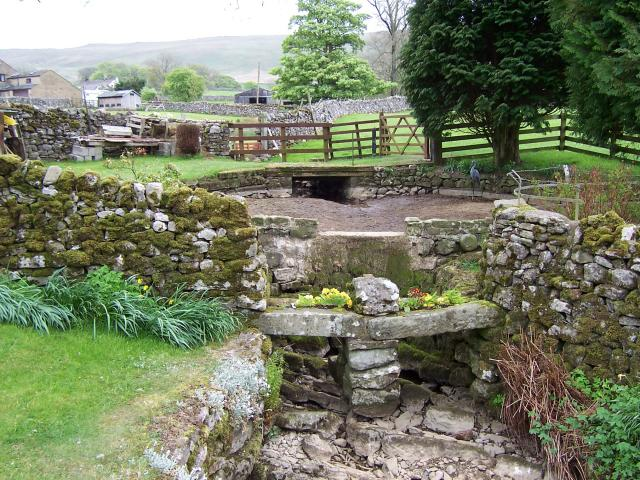
Waterless pond and waterfall, Cracoe

Cracoe is a small village and civil parish in the county of North Yorkshire, England. It is situated near to Rylstone and about 6 miles south-west of Grassington. Cracoe has an estimated population of 160 residents, measured at 178 in the 2011 census. Cracoe is a village which is also situated near Rylstone beneath Barden Fell and the twin skyline landmarks of Rylstone Cross and Cracoe Pinnacle in the Yorkshire Dales.

Evidence of an army training camp can be seen on the south-east edge of the village. The circular earthworks visible from Fell Lane are searchlight battery emplacements. The village is located 5 1/2 miles north-west of Skipton. The name of the village can be seen as famous in geological circles – for the nearby Cracoe Reef Knolls, a series of limestone hills which are geological remnants of an ancient coral reef.

Cracoe can also be seen as a township in Burnsall parish. It has a post office under the Skipton area. The parish covers roughly 2,370 acres. The parish has a population of 139 and has 32 houses.

Until 1974 it was part of the West Riding of Yorkshire. From 1974 to 2023 it was part of the Craven District, it is now administered by the unitary North Yorkshire Council.

The parish has a village hall.

Cracoe was the home of the original Calendar Girls, who raised money to support Leukaemia Research Fund, by posing nude for a calendar.

On 5 July 2014, the Tour de France Stage 1 from Leeds to Harrogate passed through the village.

A railway branch from Skipton terminates at Swinden Quarry in the north of the parish. This is a remnant of the Yorkshire Dales Railway, which used to continue to Grassington.

== See also ==
- Listed buildings in Cracoe
