= Rylstone railway station =

Disused railway station in North Yorkshire, England

Rylstone
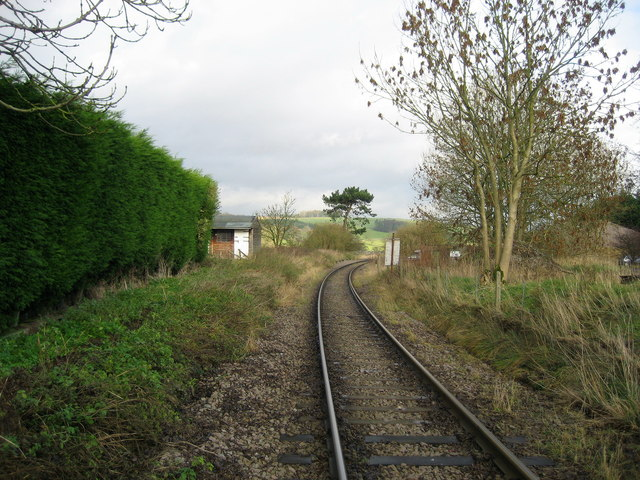
- Site of Rylstone Station in 2006

General information
- Location: Rylstone, North Yorkshire; England
- Coordinates: 54.0312°N 2.0533°W
- Grid reference: SD96625949
- Platforms: 1

Other information
- Status: Disused

History
- Pre-grouping: Midland Railway
- Post-grouping: London, Midland and Scottish Railway

Key dates
- 29 July 1902: Opened
- 22 September 1930: Closed to passengers
- 11 August 1969: Closed completely
Location

Rylstone railway station was a railway station that served the small village of Rylstone in North Yorkshire, England. It was built by the Yorkshire Dales Railway and operated by the Midland Railway. The station opened on 29 July 1902 with a station building that was to the same design as most of the stations on the Derwent Valley Light Railway.

The station had just one platform with a through line, with a goods shed and cattle dock to the east side, and a passing loop to the north of the station.

The LMS closed the station to passengers in 1930, but special 'tourist trains' ran to Grassington & Threshfield via Rylstone up until 11 August 1969. Rylstone station has been demolished, but the line is still open to Swinden Quarry.

Preceding station	Disused railways	Following station
Skipton	Midland Railway; Yorkshire Dales Railway	Grassington & Threshfield
