= Swinden Quarry =

Quarry in North Yorkshire, England

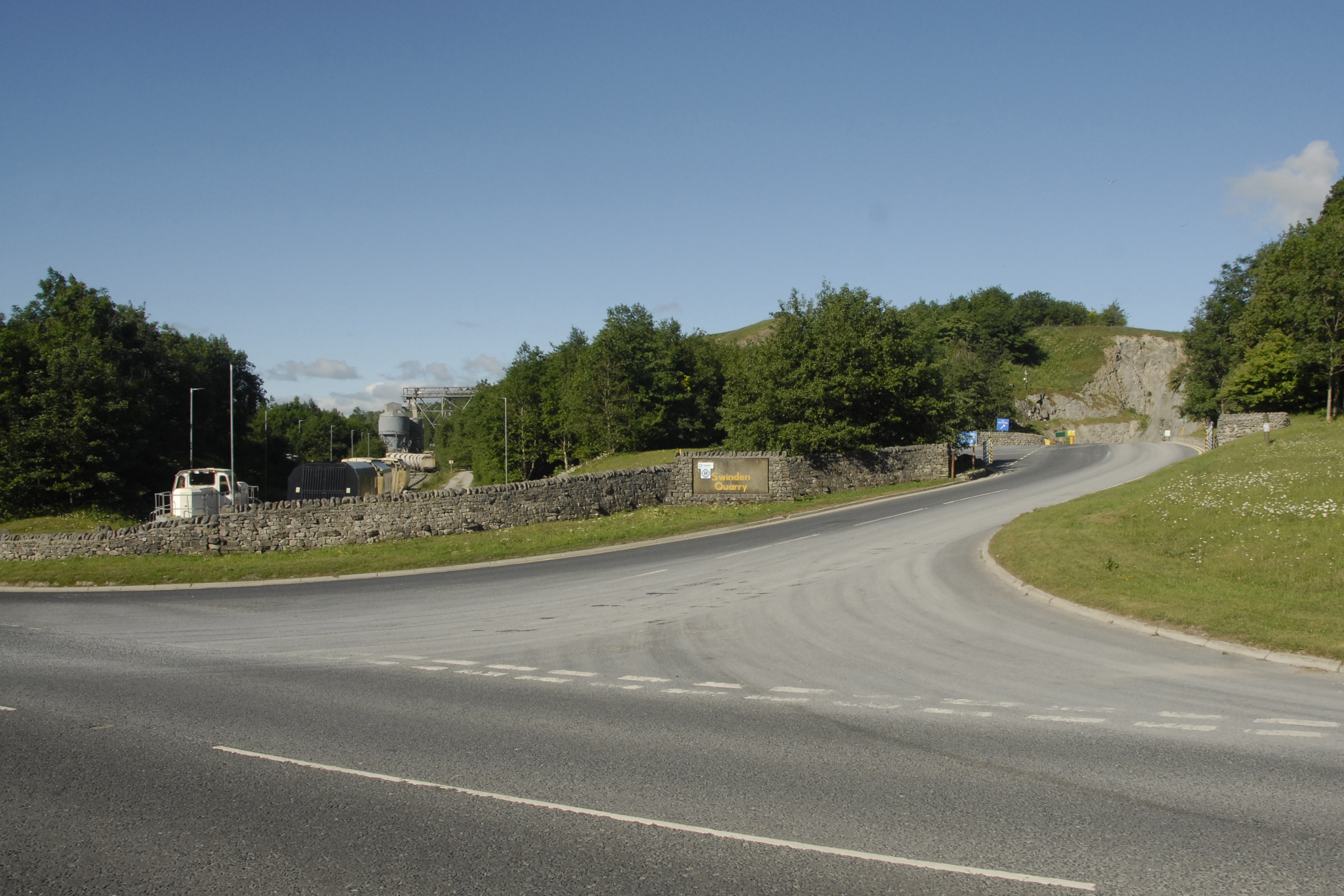
- The road entrance to Swinden Quarry near to Rylstone in North Yorkshire. The rail fed sidings are on the left with the quarry face poking up on the top right

- Location within North Yorkshire
- Location: England; 54.05063°N 2.03117°W
- Opened: 1899
- Website: www.tarmac.com/locations/swinden-quarry/

Swinden Quarry is 0.6 miles (1 km) north of the village of Cracoe, and 1.9 miles (3 km) south-west of Grassington in North Yorkshire, England. It is owned by LaFarge Tarmac. The former Skipton-Grassington railway line still serves this location, and in railway terminology, the site is known as Rylstone Quarry.

Swinden Quarry railway yard is near the village of Cracoe, at the northern end of the old Skipton to Grassington line built by the Yorkshire Dales Railway. It is now the terminus of the line as the portion north of there to the former terminus at Threshfield was closed in 1969 and subsequently lifted (the B6265 road now passes across the old formation just beyond the buffer stops).

== Quarry details ==
Although quarrying in the vicinity of the modern day concern dates back to 1793, the current quarry works were started by P. W. Spencer in 1899, and greatly enlarged in 1902 with the opening of the adjacent railway.

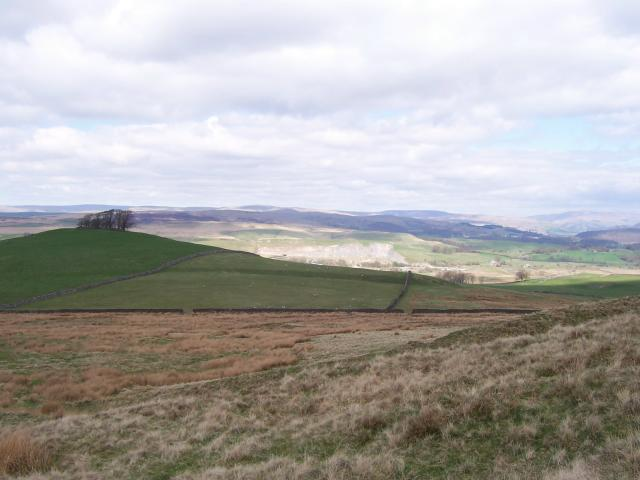
Looking past Skelterton Hill towards the quarry

The quarry is set deep into the landscape and despite some surface workings being visible from the B6265 road, most of the site is hidden as a result of it being dug down out of a hill. Much of the industrial plant machinery was moved from the exterior of the plant and into the quarry workings, so that they are hidden by the high surrounding banks of the quarry itself.

In 1971, production at the site was greatly increased due to the company (Tilcon) winning a British Steel contract. Two new kilns were brought in to operate 24 hours a day, but this had the side-effect of spewing calcium dust over the surrounding area, and in 1983, the company was ordered by the High Court to pay compensation and legal costs of £120,000 (equivalent to £408,000 in 2025).

Products exported from the site include roadstone, agricultural lime, industrial carbonate, crushed rock aggregate & pre-cast concrete products. A significant tonnage of the quarried material is exported from the site by rail, although there can be up to 42,000 lorry journeys on the B6265 per year. As part of a proposal to extend the life of the quarry beyond 2030, the owners have indicated a greater reliance on rail transport with a consistent reduction of lorry movements.

The site has been designated as an SSSI, as the quarrying has exposed the Carboniferous Limestone and shows how the stone developed through the different beds of rock.

The rail loading area is used as a park and ride facility for the annual Christmas festival at Grassington.

== Railfreight services ==
Limestone services from the quarry are operated to Dairycoates (Hull), Leyland and Marsh Lane/Hunslet (Leeds) by GB Railfreight. GB Railfreight also previously operated occasional services of limestone to Small Heath and Wellingborough.

Preceding station	National Rail	Following station
Skipton	GB Railfreight; Freight only route	Terminus
	Disused railways	
Rylstone	Midland Railway; Yorkshire Dales Railway	Grassington & Threshfield

== See also ==
- Tarmac
