= Gargrave railway station =

Railway station in North Yorkshire, England

Gargrave
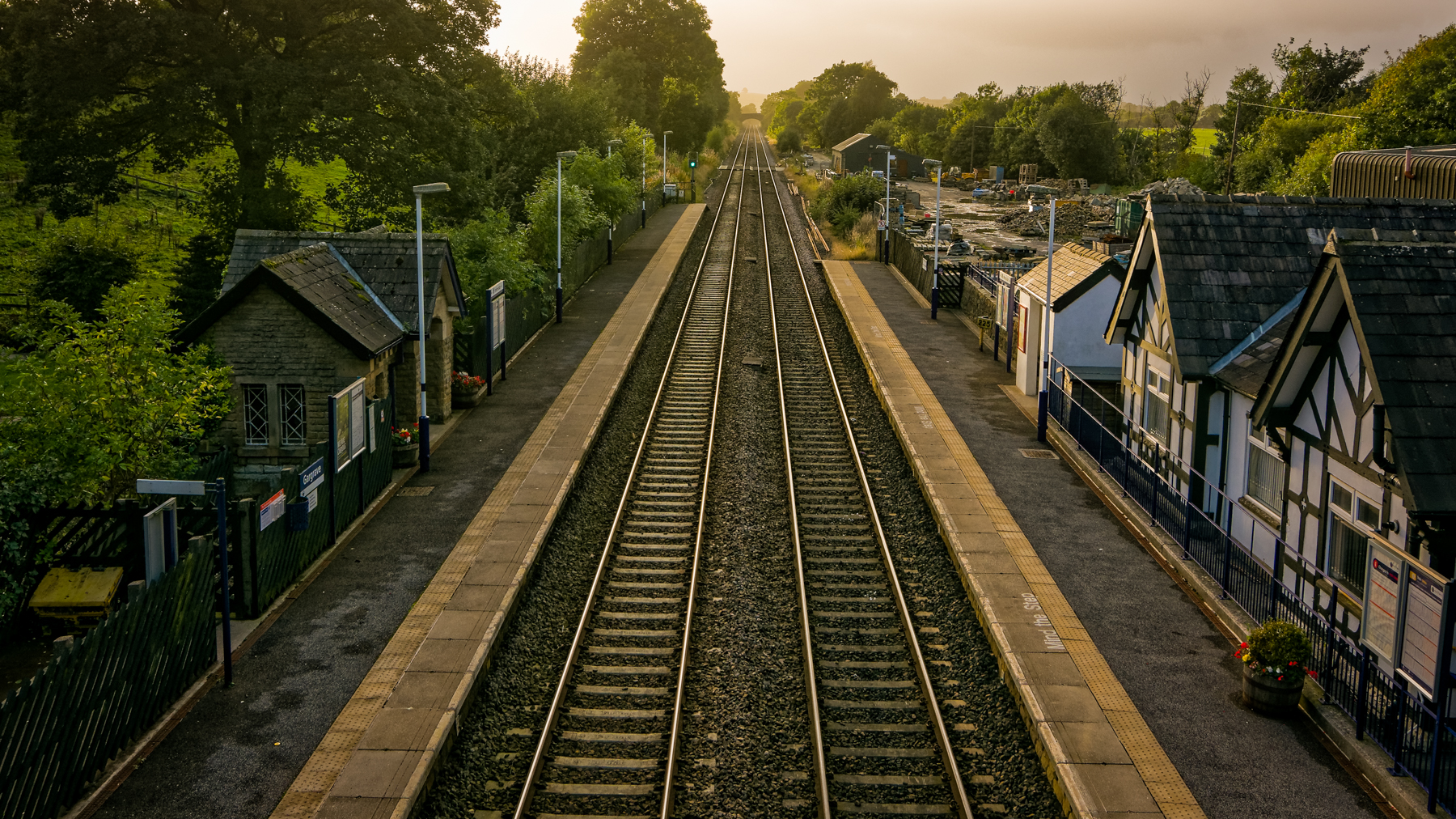

General information
- Location: Gargrave, North Yorkshire; England
- Coordinates: 53°58′42″N 2°06′18″W
- Grid reference: SD932535
- Owner: Network Rail
- Manager: Northern Trains
- Platforms: 2
- Tracks: 2

Other information
- Station code: GGV
- Classification: DfT category F2

History
- Original company: "Little" North Western Railway
- Pre-grouping: Midland Railway
- Post-grouping: London, Midland and Scottish Railway; British Rail (London Midland Region)

Key dates
- 30 July 1849: Opened

Passengers
- 2021/22: ▲23,644
- 2022/23: ▲32,726
- 2023/24: ▲35,182
- 2024/25: ▲40,672
- 2025/26: ▲42,044
Location
- Location within North Yorkshire
Notes
- Passenger statistics from the Office of Rail and Road

Gargrave is a railway station on the Bentham Line, which runs between Leeds and Morecambe via Skipton. The station, situated 30 miles (48 km) north-west of Leeds, serves the village of Gargrave in North Yorkshire. It is owned by Network Rail and managed by Northern Trains.

== History ==
The station was opened on 30 July 1849 by the "Little" North Western Railway, later taken over by the Midland Railway. The original stone shelters survive on each platform, but the main wooden station building is now in private use.

== Facilities ==
The station is unstaffed, digital information screens were installed as part of an ongoing upgrade process announced in 2016. Level access is only possible for southbound travellers, as the northbound platform can only be reached by steps from the road bridge.

== Pennine Way ==
The Pennine Way, a long-distance path, crosses the railway a few hundred yards to the west of the station.

== Services ==
The service level from here in both directions was increased at the May 2018 timetable change, as a consequence of the 2015 Northern franchise award to Arriva Rail North. The improvements included two additional trains each way on the Leeds - Lancaster route on weekdays and an extra train on Sundays - these began operating on 20 May 2018 with the start of the summer timetable.

In total there are now fourteen departures northbound (up from ten prior to May 2018) - eight to Lancaster and five to Carlisle, plus one evening train to Ribblehead. Five of the Lancaster trains continue to Morecambe, but the daily direct Heysham train has now ceased. Southbound there are thirteen departures to Leeds, plus a single late evening departure to Skipton only (though this has a connection to Leeds from there).

Eight trains each way call on Sundays (five to Lancaster and Morecambe, three to Carlisle northbound).

== Sources ==
- Bairstow, M. (2000). The 'Little' North Western Railway. Leeds: Martin Bairstow. ISBN 1-871944-21-X.

Preceding station	National Rail	Following station
Skipton	Northern Trains; Bentham Line	Hellifield
Skipton	Northern Trains; Settle and Carlisle Line	Hellifield
	Historical railways	
Skipton	Midland Railway "Little" North Western Railway	Bell Busk
