= Skirethorns =

Hamlet in North Yorkshire, England

Coordinates: 54.070°N 2.034°W

- Hamlet
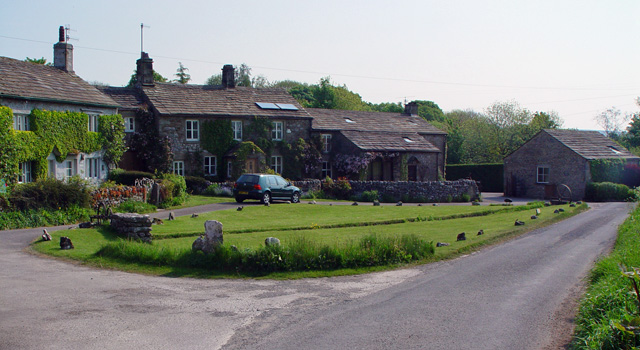
- A house next to Bell Bank Farm

- Location within North Yorkshire
- OS grid reference: SD978638
- Civil parish: Threshfield
- Unitary authority: North Yorkshire
- Ceremonial county: North Yorkshire
- Region: Yorkshire and the Humber
- Country: England
- Sovereign state: United Kingdom
- Post town: SKIPTON
- Postcode district: BD23
- Police: North Yorkshire
- Fire: North Yorkshire
- Ambulance: Yorkshire
- UK Parliament: Skipton and Ripon

Skirethorns is a hamlet in the civil parish of Threshfield, in Wharfedale, North Yorkshire, England. The hamlet is just west of the village of Threshfield, in the Yorkshire Dales National Park, some 6 miles (9.7 km) south of Kettlewell, and 8 miles (13 km) north of Skipton. Threshfield Quarry is located north-west of the hamlet, and despite its name, it is located in Skirethorns.

== History ==
Evidence of the area around Skirethorns being settled by paleolithic man was discovered in the 1890s. Skulls of reindeer, bison, and wolves were found in caves and barrows to the north of the hamlet. A Roman Road was built through the area of Skirethorns which linked Settle with Grassington, and there is evidence of a Viking settlement at Hubba-Cove Heights, which is just to the west of the hamlet.

Skirethorns is not mentioned in the Domesday Book (though nearby Threshfield is), and the name of the hamlet derives from a combination of Old Norse (Skirr) and Old English (Thorn), meaning The Bright Thorns. The hamlet, and also the wider area, have additionally been known by the alternative name of Skythorns.

Historically, Skirethorns was in the wapentake of Staincliffe East, the ecclesiastical district of Linton Falls, and in the Skipton Rural District, until 1974, when it was transferred from the West Riding of Yorkshire into North Yorkshire. The hamlet lies within the parish of Threshfield, and is represented at Westminster as part of the Skipton and Ripon Constituency. Until the boundary changes of 1974, the hamlet was part of the township of Threshfield, the village just to the east. The Yorkshire Dales Landscape Sensitivity statement recommends that the land between Threshfield and Skirethorns remains undeveloped to preserve the rural setting and prevent the two settlements "coalescing".

Between 1974 and 2023, Skirethorns was part of the Craven District of North Yorkshire. Skirethorns is in the Yorkshire Dales National Park, and part of the Wharfedale landscape character area. Skirethorns has about twenty houses, and its population is recorded as part of the Threshfield civil parish statistics. There are just three listed buildings in Skirethorns; Bell Bank, Lane House, and Moss House, all of which are Grade II listed.

There is one SSSI in the hamlet - Meadow Croft, a 0.4 hectares (0.99 acres) meadow covered in grasses. It is listed under the alternative location of Skythorns.

=== Threshfield Quarry ===
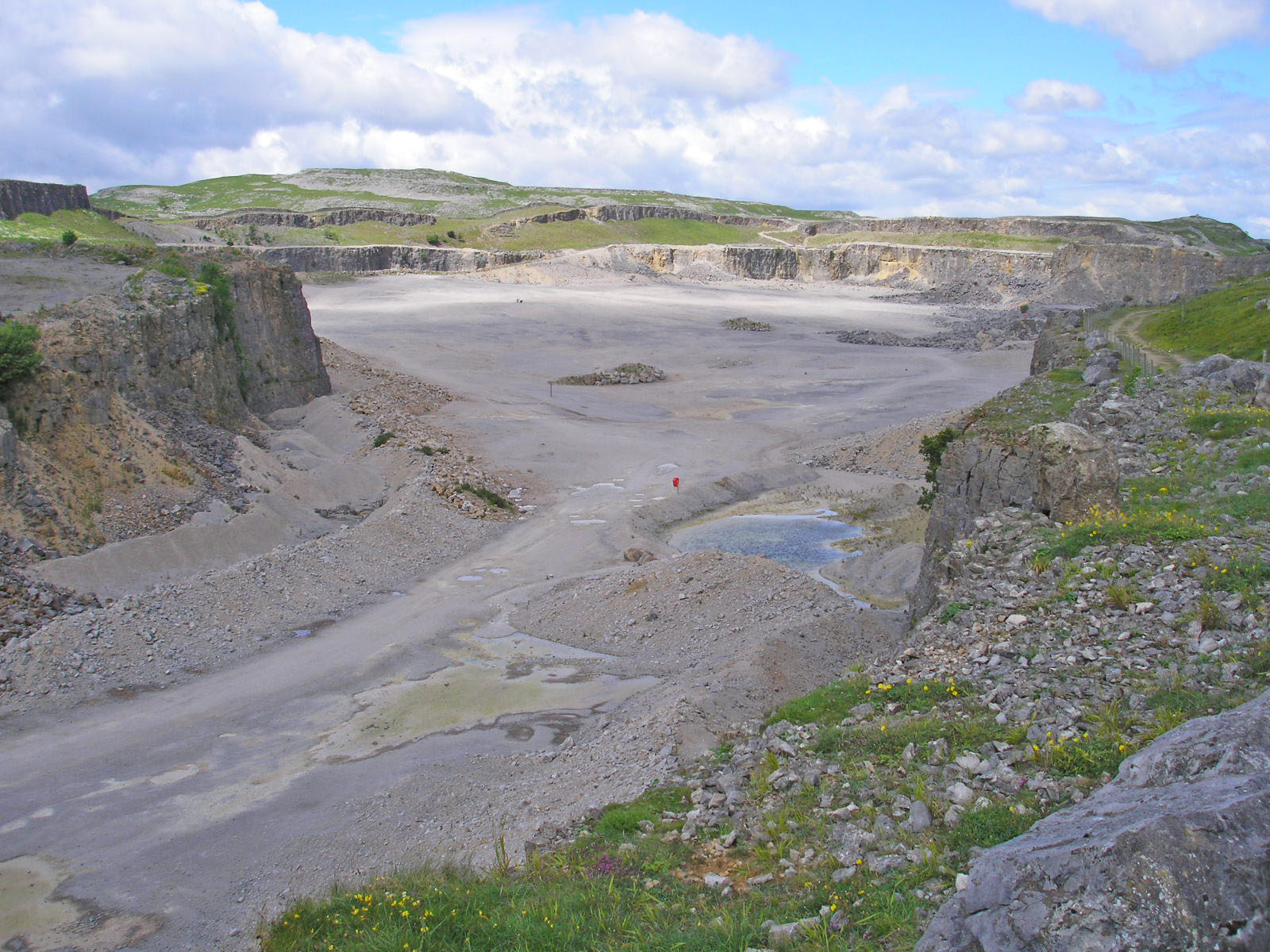
Threshfield Quarry

Despite being named Threshfield Quarry, this 12-acre (5-hectare) limestone working was actually located north-west of Skirethorns hamlet. The quarry was opened out in 1900, and had a tramway 1,310 yards (1,200 m) long which connected it with the station area of Grassington & Threshfield railway station. Products sent out included limestone, lime, for which five kilns were installed for roasting the limestone, and dolomite. Since closure in the year 2000, the site has been open to the public, although the main lagoon was drained after it became an attraction for people to gather and swim in during the post COVID-19 lockdowns. In 2010, the site was identified as a good location for a native white-clawed crayfish ark, with crayfish that were endangered on both the Aire and Wharfe catchment being removed to the ponds at Threshfield Quarry. Broad-leaf woodland now fringes the edges of the quarry, and the effect of the quarry workings on the landscape has diminished since closure, with it now being less visually intrusive.

Tyne Beck, which rises to the north of the quarry face, flows partly through the quarry and forms a waterfall during periods of heavy rain. The beck becomes part of the Linton Catchment of the River Wharfe.

Historically, until the arrival of the railways in Upper Wharfedale, coal was mined to the south-west of Skirethorns at Skythorns Pasture. Lead was also mined here too.

== See also ==
- Listed buildings in Threshfield
