= Grassington & Threshfield railway station =

Disused railway station in North Yorkshire, England

Grassington & Threshfield
- Grassington & Threshfield station soon after closure

General information
- Location: Grassington, North Yorkshire; England
- Coordinates: 54.070459°N 2.009800°W
- Grid reference: SD994638
- Platforms: 2

Other information
- Status: Disused

History
- Pre-grouping: Midland Railway
- Post-grouping: London, Midland and Scottish Railway

Key dates
- 30 July 1902: Opened as "Grassington"
- October 1902: Renamed "Grassington & Threshfield"
- 22 September 1930: Closed to passengers
- 11 August 1969: Closed completely
Location

Grassington & Threshfield railway station (or Threshfield station) was a railway station that served the town of Grassington and village of Threshfield, in North Yorkshire, England.

== History ==
The Yorkshire Dales Railway constructed the line to Grassington & Threshfield, with services operated by the Midland Railway, to provide better links for local villages to the nearby town of Skipton. It diverged at Embsay Junction, and ran through the Dales, with a station at Rylstone, past the then 'Swinden Lime Works' (today known as Swinden Quarry), and a further 3 miles (5 km) to Threshfield. Despite being the line's terminus, Grassington & Threshfield was built as a through station, because there were proposals to continue the line further north up the Dales to Kettlewell, and thence to Leyburn, to join the line to Hawes on the Wensleydale Railway. That was never done.

The station, which opened with the line in mid-1902, had two platforms, each with a run-round loop, and a goods shed and cattle dock with their own sidings. Another siding branched west towards Skirethorns Quarry, ending at the rear of a set of terraced houses known as Woodlands Terrace. Limestone was brought down from the quarry by a tramway to Woodlands Terrace, where it was transferred to trains.

On 22 September 1930, after only 28 years, the LMS withdrew regular passenger services due to poor patronage. However, excursion traffic continued for more than 30 years thereafter, as did general goods traffic and stone traffic from the nearby quarry. The end of quarrying in the early 1960s eventually led to the complete closure of the station, and the northern end of the branch, on 11 August 1969.

== The site today ==
The track was lifted on the final section north of Swinden Quarry in 1971 and the old station buildings were demolished soon afterwards. A housing estate now occupies the site.

== Embsay Junction ==
Embsay Junction was laid at the opening of the line in 1902 to take trains from Skipton to Rylstone Station and Threshfield station. The branch was single throughout.

The other direction was the Skipton to Ilkley Line across the Dales, with stations at Embsay, Bolton Abbey, Addingham and finally ending up at Ilkley. The line was double-tracked, as it formed a useful relief route for the busy main line via Keighley. The Ilkley line was closed in 1966, but the signal box at the junction remained in use until July 1969 (to give access for track-lifting trains and to the quarry siding at Embsay). The remaining double track portion down to Skipton was singled at the same time.

Preceding station	Disused railways	Following station
Rylstone	Midland Railway; Yorkshire Dales Railway	Terminus
