= Skipton railway station =

Railway station in North Yorkshire, England

Skipton
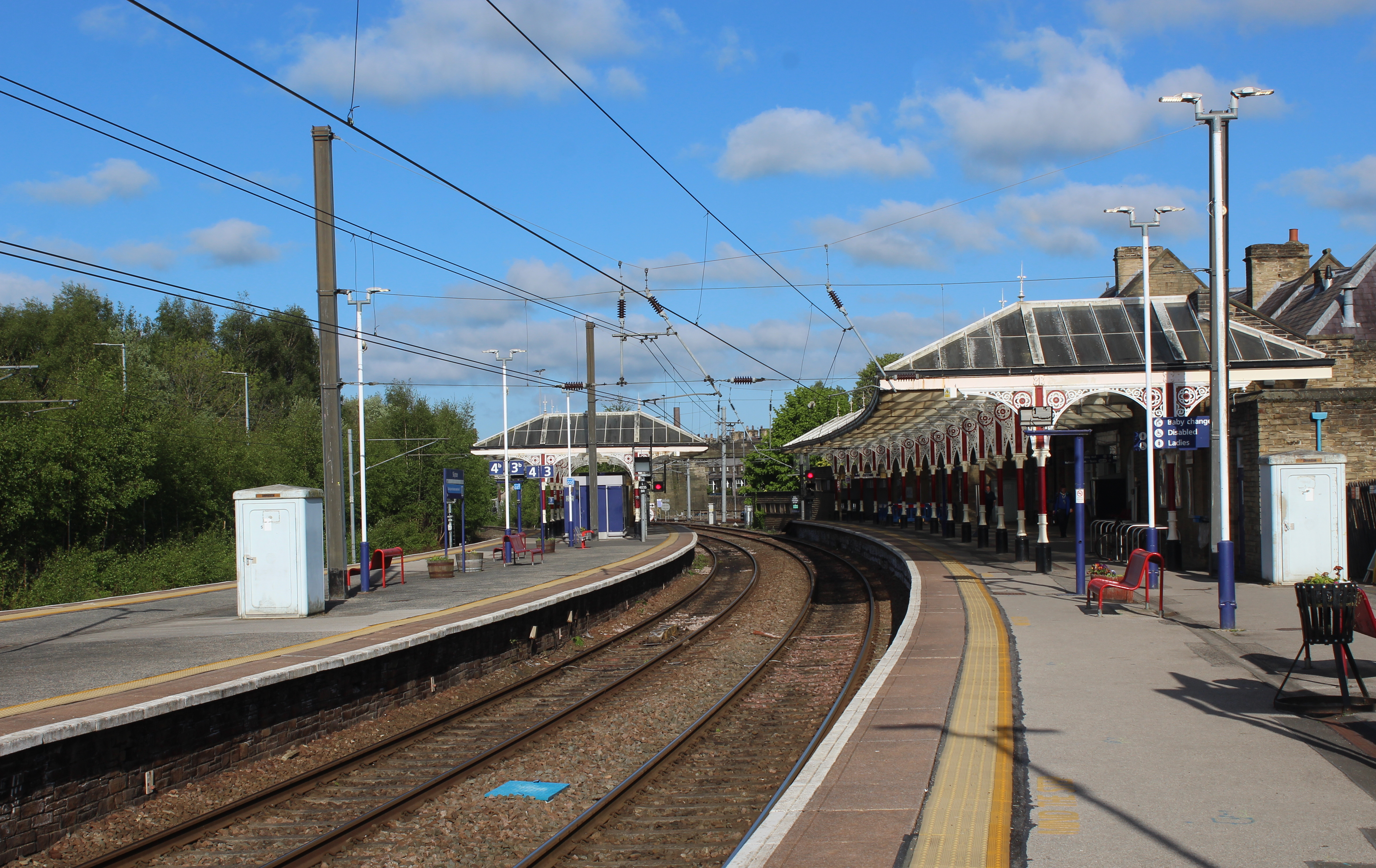

General information
- Location: Skipton, North Yorkshire, England
- Coordinates: 53.9586°N 2.0264°W
- Grid reference: SD983513
- Owner: Network Rail
- Manager: Northern Trains
- Transit authority: West Yorkshire (Metro)
- Platforms: 4

Other information
- Station code: SKI
- Fare zone: 7
- Classification: DfT category D

History
- Original company: Leeds and Bradford Extension Railway
- Pre-grouping: Midland Railway
- Post-grouping: London, Midland and Scottish Railway

Key dates
- 1847: Opened
- 1876: Relocated
- 1888: Ilkley platforms added
- 1965: Ilkley platforms closed

Passengers
- 2021/22: ▲0.944 million
- 2022/23: ▲1.099 million
- 2023/24: ▲1.178 million
- 2024/25: ▲1.286 million
- 2025/26: ▲1.367 million

Listed Building – Grade II
- Feature: Skipton railway station
- Designated: 4 April 1991
- Reference no.: 1249186
Location
Notes
- Passenger statistics from the Office of Rail and Road

Skipton railway station is a Grade II listed station which serves the market town of Skipton, in North Yorkshire, England. It is a stop on the Airedale Line, which provides access to destinations including Leeds, Bradford, Carlisle, Lancaster and Morecambe. The station is operated by Northern Trains and is situated 27 miles (43 km) north-west of Leeds; it is located on Broughton Road.

== History ==
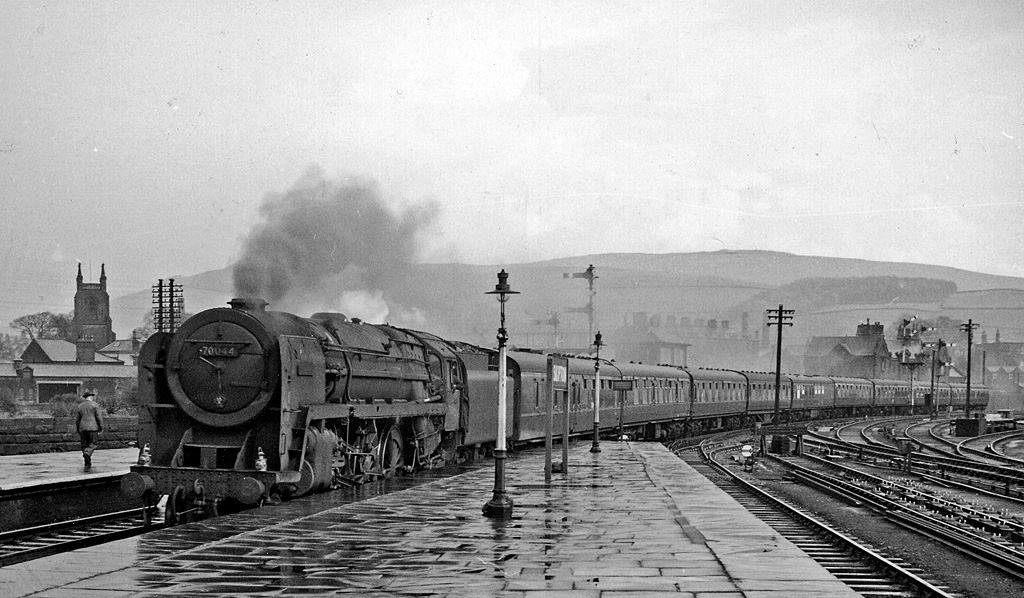
Thames-Clyde Express in 1961

As the "Gateway to the Yorkshire Dales", Skipton historically has had high volumes of leisure traffic. Ilkley serves as an alternative for this function, being at the southern end of the Dales Way.

The original station was opened on 7 September 1847 by the Leeds and Bradford Extension Railway, as a temporary terminus of its line from Bradford Market Street. The line was extended to Colne a year later on 2 October 1848.

Initially, passengers would leave the train at Skipton for onward travel to the villages of Wharfedale by horse-drawn coach. There are still over 20 hotels clustered around the station, including the historic Herriots Hotel (formerly the Midland Hotel).

The next year, the "little" North Western Railway opened a line from Skipton to Ingleton on 30 July 1849; this was eventually extended to Lancaster Green Ayre and Morecambe in 1850.

On 30 April 1876, Skipton station was relocated 450 yards (410 m) north-west of its original location. By now, both the Leeds and Bradford and North Western railways had been absorbed by the Midland Railway. The new station coincided with the opening of the Midland's Settle-Carlisle Line, which made Skipton a stop on the London St Pancras to Glasgow Central main line. The new station had four platforms and cost over £15,000, compared with the original cost of £2,300. Platform 1 was a bay platform at the Bradford end, adjacent to the station building along with through platform 2, while platforms 3 and 4 formed an island platform.

On 1 October 1888, platforms 5 and 6 were added to serve the Skipton to Ilkley Line, which opened that day. These platforms were at a slightly higher level on a rising gradient, as the new line ran south-west of the existing line and then crossed over it by bridge eastwards. These platforms were also later used by the Yorkshire Dales Railway, a short branch to Grassington from 1902 to 1930. Passenger services to Ilkley ceased on 22 March 1965, after which platforms 5 and 6 were closed to passengers and their access subway was closed off. However, the line through platform 5 is still in use as a single-track freight line to Swinden Quarry via the former Yorkshire Dales line. The track through platform 6 has been lifted. The 1847 station buildings survived intact, latterly used as offices, until 1967 when they were demolished; the site is now occupied by a Morrisons supermarket.

The line to Colne closed on 2 February 1970 and its tracks were lifted the following year. The disused formation is still visible, though the A629 bypass road occupies a short section immediately west of the former junction with the line to Carlisle & Lancaster. An organisation called SELRAP is campaigning for the reinstatement of the link and runs occasional charter trains between the two stations, using a long diversionary route to point out the eleven-mile "missing link".

In the 1970s, the track was removed from platform 1 and platform 4 was used as a siding. However, all four platforms were put back in use when the track layout and signalling were updated in 1994 for electrification. As part of this work, both remaining signal boxes were closed and demolished (control initially passing to Leeds PSB and eventually to the IECC at York) and the former goods yard was converted for use as a carriage depot, complete with a new washer plant. This was upgraded and expanded in 2011 to add capacity for a further three units. Several EMU and DMU sets are stored there overnight and at weekends.

In 1998, the station underwent complete renovation, in preparation for the introduction of direct InterCity services to London King's Cross. In 2004, the station underwent another minor renovation in preparation for a visit by Prince Charles. Following a change of cleaning contract in early 2007, users of the station began to complain about an alleged deterioration in cleanliness at the station, particularly in the waiting rooms.

The station is used for the overnight servicing of trains. On 9 August 2003, an Arriva Trains Northern employee was seriously assaulted by a group of vandals after challenging two males daubing graffiti on a stabled train.

Major alterations were made to the station when the 2011 Eureka EC clock-face timetable came into effect, including a northbound Sundays-only service from the capital.

== Facilities ==
The station has four platforms. The ticket office is staffed mornings and afternoons, along with automatic ticket machines. There are three seated waiting rooms, luggage trolleys, a small café, toilets, a post box and a pay-phone available. There is a taxi rank immediately outside the station, with bus links nearby, and a car park with spaces for 100 vehicles.

Ticket barriers are in operation and a penalty fare scheme was implemented on Airedale Line routes in December 2017. Step-free access is available to all platforms from the station entrance, with platforms 3 and 4 via a subway.

== Services ==
Skipton is served by two train operating companies.

Northern Trains operates services on the following routes:

- The Airedale Line generally provides a half-hourly service to Leeds and an hourly service to Bradford Forster Square. There are additional trains to Leeds and Bradford during the morning peak and in the opposite direction in the evening rush hour. On Sundays, there is an hourly service to Leeds and to Bradford.
- The Bentham Line provides a mostly two-hourly service (with a longer interval in the afternoon) between Leeds, Lancaster, Carnforth and Morecambe.
- The Settle and Carlisle Line provides generally two-hourly services between Leeds and Carlisle.

London North Eastern Railway operates a daily return service from Skipton to London King's Cross, via Leeds; the morning southbound train does not run on Sundays.

| Preceding station | National Rail | Following station |
|---|---|---|
| Keighley | Northern Trains; Leeds–Morecambe line | Gargrave |
| Keighley | Northern Trains; Settle–Carlisle line | Gargrave |
| Keighley | London North Eastern Railway; East Coast Main Line (Limited service) | Terminus |
| Cononley | Northern Trains; Airedale line | Terminus |
| | Historical railways | |
| Embsay | Midland Railway; Skipton–Ilkley line | Terminus |
| Rylstone | Midland Railway; Yorkshire Dales Railway | Terminus |
| Elslack | Midland Railway; Leeds and Bradford Extension Railway | Cononley |
| Terminus | Midland Railway "Little" North Western Railway | Gargrave |

== Future ==
Skipton is likely to see changes over coming years, in order to cope with expected growth:

- London North Eastern Railway has expressed a desire to introduce more direct services to London King's Cross, although no specific commitments have yet been made.
- Network Rail is also currently investigating means of increasing capacity on the Airedale Line to Leeds, as part of the Yorkshire and Humber Route Utilisation Strategy (RUS). Options could include longer trains, with up to six carriages in place of the current four, or more frequent services.
- Plans for the route north of Skipton have already been outlined in the Lancashire and Cumbria RUS; this will see an increase in train frequency to Carlisle, with services running to a basic one train every two hours pattern, with extra services to fill service gaps at peak times. Leeds to Morecambe/Lancaster services would also be made more frequent; however, these would only run as far as Skipton. Opposition from stakeholders during the consultation phase of the RUS, with regard to the loss of through trains to/from Leeds, has meant that this option wasn't pursued.
- In the long term, SELRAP may achieve their aim of reopening the line to Colne; plans would probably result in some changes to the station.
- The station is served currently by Stagecoach Merseyside and South Lancashire's cross-Pennine 280 bus route to Preston, via Clitheroe. It has been proposed as the focus of a park-and-ride scheme serving commuters to Lancaster and Leeds.

=== Embsay and Bolton Abbey Steam Railway ===
Since preservation, the Embsay and Bolton Abbey Steam Railway has held long-term plans to extend into Skipton. The Ilkley-bound platforms (5 and 6) were made redundant in 1965; however, Network Rail has carried out a survey for the reinstatement of the connecting points between the Embsay line and the freight line to Grassington, and the reinstatement of the platform 5 at Skipton. If funding is made available, then the line could be extended. Platform 6 may also be reinstated as a run-round loop as part of the project.

== See also ==
- Listed buildings in Skipton
