= Threshfield =

Village and civil parish in North Yorkshire, England

Coordinates: 54.06942°N 2.01689°W

- Location within North Yorkshire
- Population: 968 (2011 census)
- OS grid reference: SD989637
- Unitary authority: North Yorkshire
- Ceremonial county: North Yorkshire
- Region: Yorkshire and the Humber
- Country: England
- Sovereign state: United Kingdom
- Post town: Skipton
- Postcode district: BD23
- Police: North Yorkshire
- Fire: North Yorkshire
- Ambulance: Yorkshire
- UK Parliament: Skipton and Ripon

Threshfield is a village and civil parish in the county of North Yorkshire, England. A population of 968 was recorded at the 2011 census. It borders Grassington, Linton Falls, and Skirethorns. Nearby villages (within a 7 miles (11 km) radius) are Linton, Cracoe, Rylstone, Hetton, Hebden, Kilnsey, and Greenhow.

== History ==
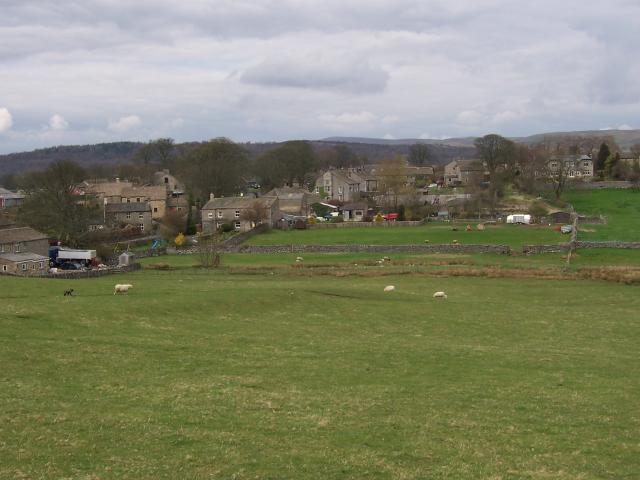
Looking east to Threshfield

Threshfield was founded by the Angles.

The name Threshfield derives from the Old English þrescfeld meaning 'threshing field'.

Before 1066 The Domesday Book shows that the Viking Gamel Bern was the landowner of here and Grassington, farming 840 acres of ploughland. The Norman conquest of England made it part of the lands of Gilbert Tison. But by 1118 Tison had suffered a demotion and his lands returned to the king then given to the honours of Percy, Ramilly, Fitz John and d’Aubigny.

The Old Hall, a Georgian inn which takes its name from the 14th century hall at the rear, was built by monks and reputedly the oldest inhabited building in Wharfedale. In the 16th century, Threshfield was part of a huge deer park.

Threshield was historically a township in the parish of Linton in the West Riding of Yorkshire. It became a separate civil parish in 1866, and was transferred to North Yorkshire in 1974. From 1974 to 2023 it was part of the Craven District, it is now administered by the unitary North Yorkshire Council.

On pre-19th century maps, Threshfield's name is sometimes inaccurately rendered as 'Rashby'.

== Sport ==
Threshfield is home to Wharfedale Rugby Union Football Club who play in National Division One.

On 5 July 2014, the Tour de France Stage 1 from Leeds to Harrogate passed through the village.

== Education ==
Threshfield School is a primary school for ages of 4–11 years and has approximately 108 pupils enrolled. The school was built in 1674 and is now a Grade II listed building. Several extensions were added; In 2000, two classrooms were built as part of a stone extension. The current headteacher is Sue Weightman.

Upper Wharfedale School is a mixed secondary school for ages 11–16 years. The school has around 320 pupils enrolled making it smaller than the average secondary school. It is a Sports College and was recently voted the most improved school in North Yorkshire.

== See also ==
- Listed buildings in Threshfield
- Grassington & Threshfield railway station
- Grassington
- Kettlewell
