= Rylstone =

Village and civil parish in North Yorkshire, England

Coordinates: 54.024400°N 2.047900°W

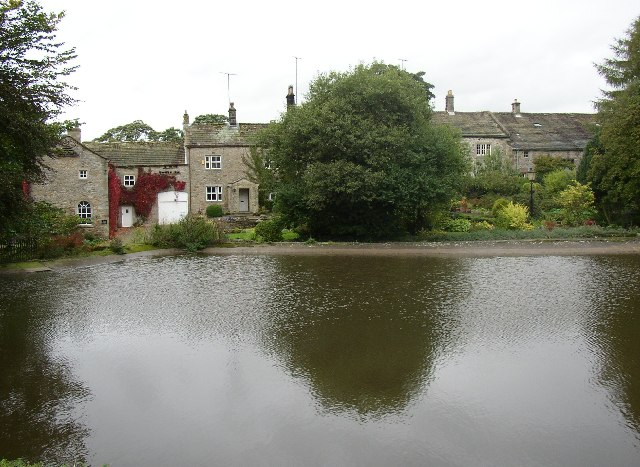
- The village duckpond in Rylstone

- Location within North Yorkshire
- Population: 180 (2015 NYCC)
- OS grid reference: SD969587
- Civil parish: Rylstone
- Unitary authority: North Yorkshire
- Ceremonial county: North Yorkshire
- Region: Yorkshire and the Humber
- Country: England
- Sovereign state: United Kingdom
- Post town: SKIPTON
- Postcode district: BD23
- Police: North Yorkshire
- Fire: North Yorkshire
- Ambulance: Yorkshire

Rylstone is a village and civil parish in the county of North Yorkshire, England. It is situated very near to Cracoe and about 6 miles (9.7 km) south west of Grassington. The population of the civil parish as of the 2001 census was 122, and had risen to 160 by the time of the 2011 census. In 2015, the population was estimated to be 180.

== History ==
The village is mentioned in the Domesday Book as Rilestun as belonging to Dolgfinn, but with no population or taxable land (waste). The name derives from Old English of Ryneles-tun: town by the brook. To the south-east of the village on the slopes of Rylstone Fell, is the remains of Norton Tower, a summer residence for the Norton family, one time lords of the Manor of Rylstone. The family were Catholics, and they supported freeing Mary Queen of Scots and the Pilgrimage of Grace, both of which failed and cost the family their estates. The tower ruins are grade II listed. Rylstone Fell rises to a height of 1,450 feet (440 m), whilst the village is lower down in the valley at a height of 630 feet (192 m) above sea level.

Rylstone railway station opened in 1902, closed to passengers in 1930, and closed completely in 1969. The village has a church, St Peter's, which was rebuilt in 1854, and has about 35 buildings. In 1876, the village was separated from the ancient parish of Burnsall into its own parish of Rilstone with Conistone (Rilstone being an old spelling of the village name). Besides the Anglican church, the Quakers had some land along what is known as Chapel Lane, upon which they had a limited amount of burial space.

The nearest primary school is in Cracoe (to the north), and this was rated as being Good in 2024. The village has one main road running through it, the B6265, with just one other through road, Raikes Lane, which leads east towards Hetton. The old trackway in the village came down form the moor on the eastern side, and headed out towards Cracoe by the manor house and around the church, on a path which is marked as Chapel Lane on Ordnance Survey mapping. Chapel Lane was part of the original 19th century turnpike between Skipton and Grassington. Rylstone is served by the number 72 bus route between Skipton and Grassington, with seven services in each direction through the week.

The members of Rylstone and District Women's Institute were the inspiration for the 2003 film Calendar Girls, although the film was shot based in nearby Kettlewell.

On 5 July 2014, the Tour de France Stage 1 from Leeds to Harrogate passed through the village.

Rylstone is referenced in the poem entitled The White Doe of Rylstone by William Wordsworth.

== Governance ==
The parish of Rylstone was historically in the wapentake of Staincliffe East, in the old West Riding of Yorkshire. Rylstone was in the ancient parish of Burnsall until 1876, when it was created as a parish in its own right. Up until 1974, it was in the Skipton Rural District, and then was moved into the North Yorkshire Craven District. The Craven District was abolished in 2023, and the area became part of North Yorkshire Council for local government. It is represented at Westminster as part of the Skipton and Ripon Constituency.

Population of Rylstone 1801–2015
1801	1811	1821	1831	1841	1851	1861	1871	1881	1891	1901	1911	1921	1931	1951	1961	1971	2001	2011	2015
177	192	145	115	121	123	107	118	130	136	123	116	118	112	120	111	108	122	160	180 (Note: Estimated population.)

== See also ==
- Listed buildings in Rylstone
