= Grassington Methodist Church =

Church in North Yorkshire, England

Coordinates: 54°04′28″N 1°59′48″W

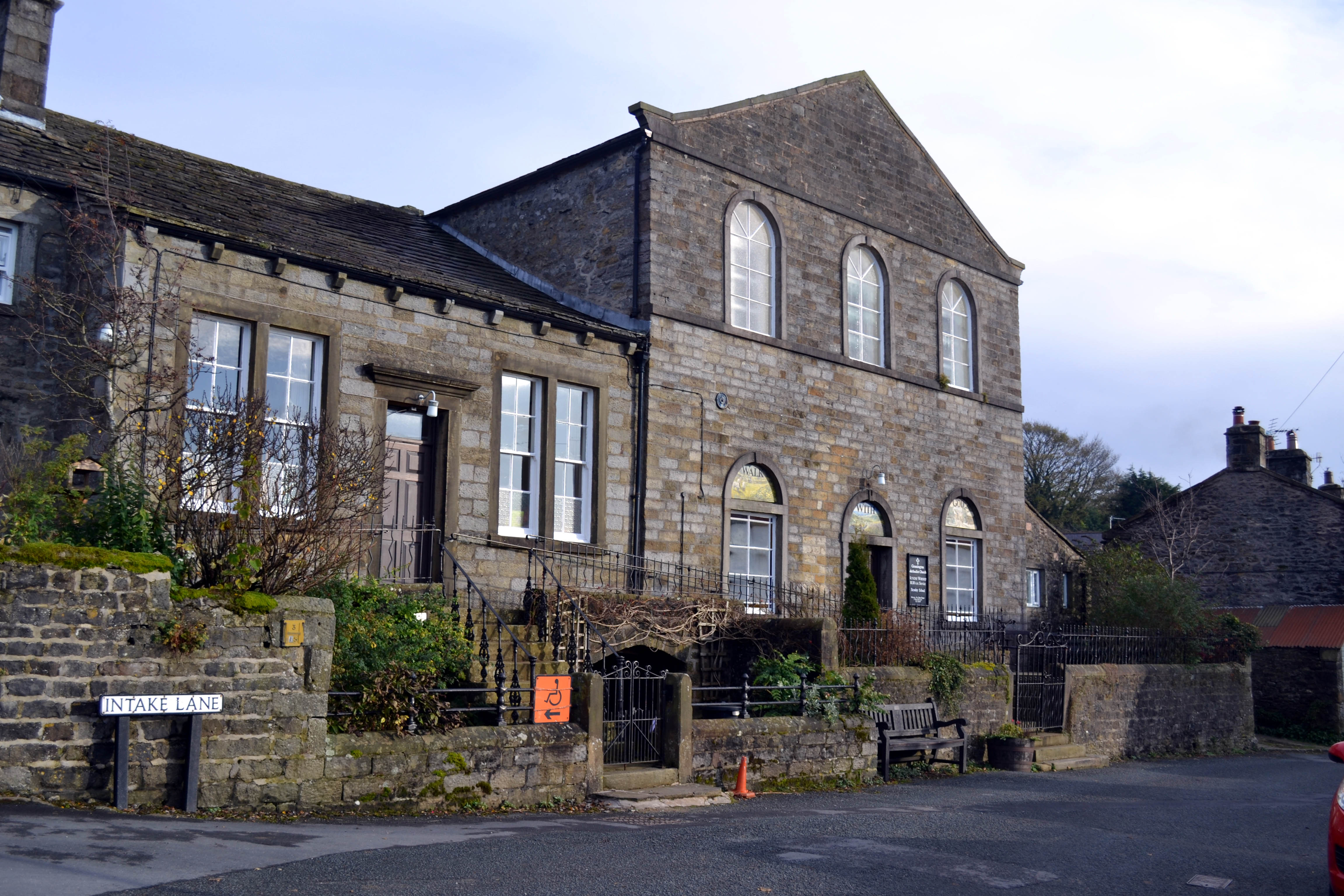
The church, in 2012

Grassington Methodist Church is a historic church in Grassington, a town in North Yorkshire, in England.

John Wesley preached in Grassington in 1780 and 1782. A congregation formed, initially as part of the Skipton circuit, but in 1810, Grassington was given its own circuit, with a dedicated minister. A new chapel was completed in 1811, with an attached Sunday school. In 1825, the building was refronted, and a new gallery and pews were installed. There was further work on the church in the late 19th century, including some new furnishings. The building was grade II listed in 1989.

The church and Sunday school are built of gritstone with stone slate roofs. The church has two tall storeys, a gabled front and three bays. On the front are a doorway and flanking windows, three similar windows in the upper floor, all with round-arched heads and blind fanlights. There is a sill band, and the gable is coped, with shaped kneelers. The school to the left has one storey, a half-basement and two bays. The central doorway has a plain surround and a cornice, and is flanked by two-light mullioned sash windows. Both the church and school are approached by steps, and the forecourts are enclosed by walls with decorative railings containing gates.

== See also ==
- Listed buildings in Grassington
