= Grassington Bridge =

Bridge in Grassington, North Yorkshire, England

Coordinates: 54°04′15″N 2°00′15″W

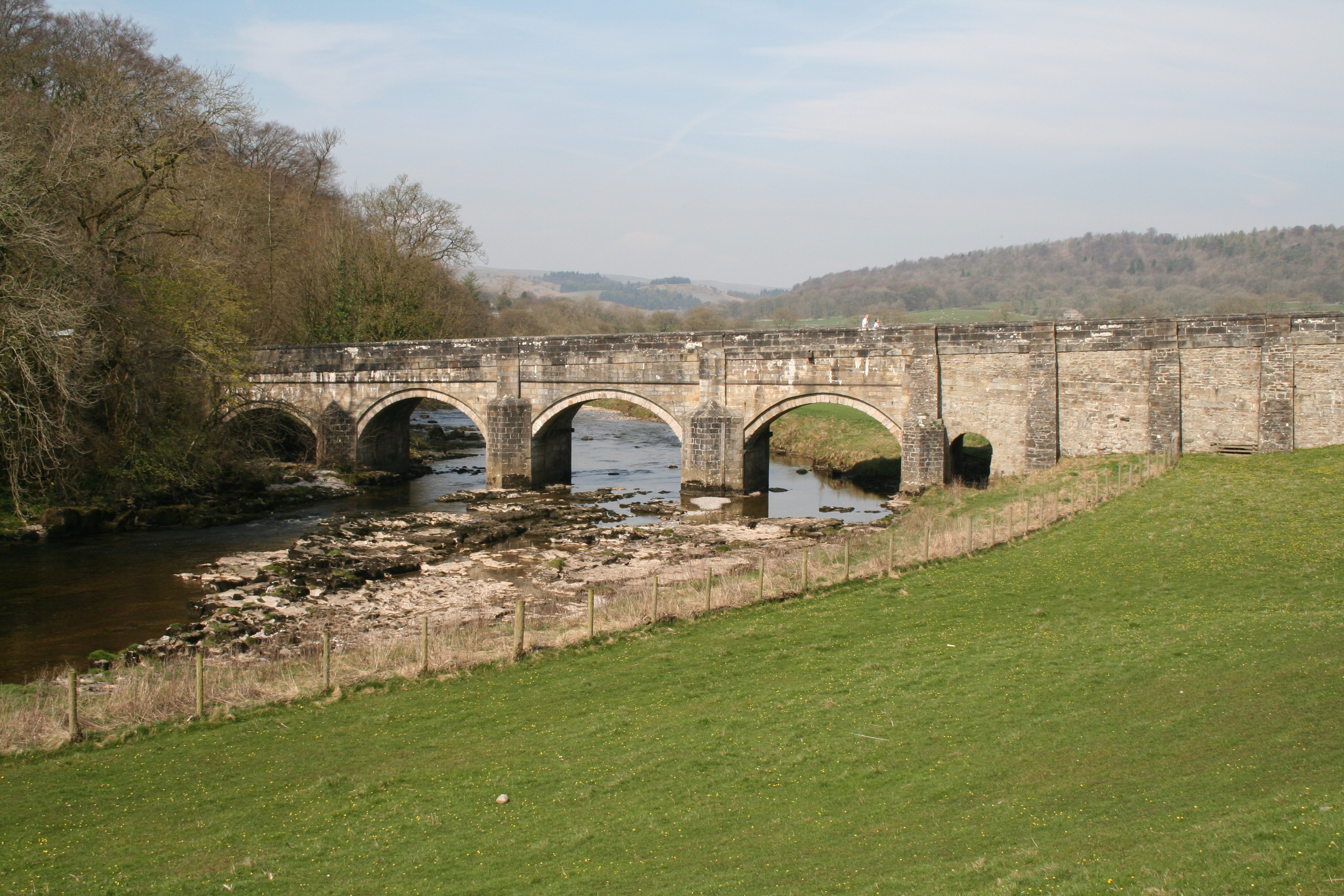
The bridge, in 2017

Grassington Bridge is a historic bridge across the River Wharfe in Grassington, a town in North Yorkshire, in England.

In the late mediaeval period, there was a timber bridge across the Wharfe from Grassington to Threshfield, known as Linton Bridge. In 1603, it was replaced by a humpbacked stone bridge. The bridge was repaired in 1661, and widened from 10 feet (3.0 m) to 24 feet (7.3 m) in 1780. In 1824, the road surface was raised, so that it was no longer humpbacked, and the parapets were rebuilt. It was grade II listed in 1954. In 1984, a cantilevered footpath was added to the upstream side. A legend states that under one of the abutments of the bridge are the irons which held the skeleton of the murdered Tom Lee.

The bridge carries Station Road, the B6265, while the Dales Way passes its north-eastern end. The bridge is built of gritstone, and consists of four segmental arches with recessed voussoirs, and is about 50 metres (160 ft) long. It has pointed cutwaters carried up as pilasters, a string course, a band, and a parapet with slightly ridged coping.

== See also ==
- Listed buildings in Grassington
