= Grassington Congregational Church =

Church in North Yorkshire, England

Coordinates: 54°04′21″N 1°59′46″W

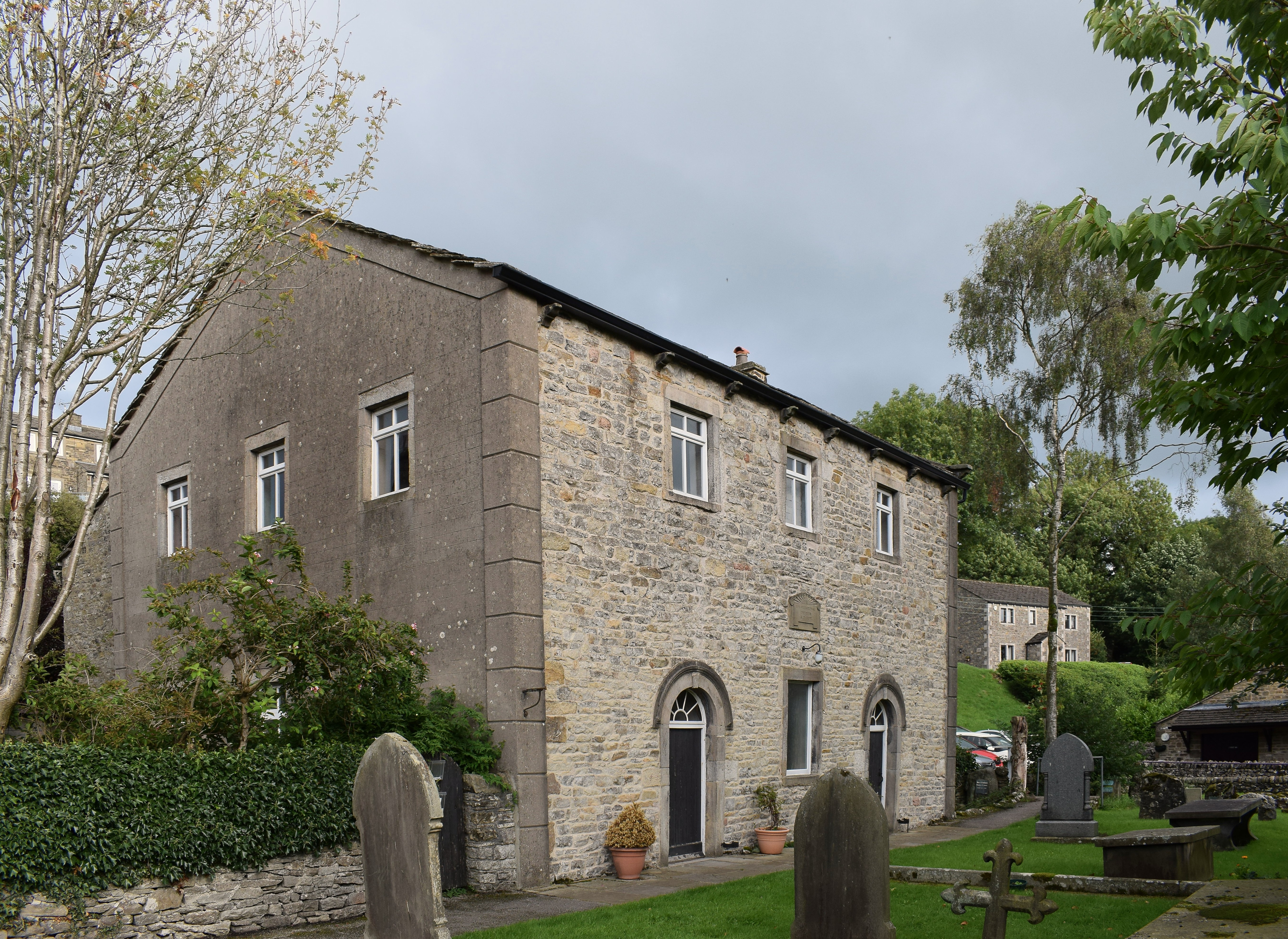
The church, in 2018

Grassington Congregational Church is a historic church in Grassington, a town in North Yorkshire, in England.

In 1811, two or three residents in Grassington became interested in congregationalism, and requested that student ministers from Idle visit to preach. This proved successful, and a church building was quickly constructed, opening on Christmas Day. In 1857, an infants' school was added at the rear of the church, and the front and left facades of the church were rendered in stone. The roof was replaced in 1861, and in 1876 pews were installed on the ground floor. An extension with a kitchen and toilets was added in 1988, and the church was repaired in 2009. The building was grade II listed in 1989.

The church is built of gritstone, partly rendered, with stone gutter brackets, and a stone slate roof with stone gable copings and kneelers. There are two storeys, and fronts of three bays. On the entrance front are incised angle pilasters, and two round-arches doorways each with an architrave, tie-stone jambs, a fanlight with radial glazing, a keystone and a hood mould. Between the doorways is a rectangular window, above which is a plaque under sun-ray moulding containing an inscription and the date. All the windows date from the 20th century. There is an internal porch, with a wooden staircase leading up to a balcony, now divided from the main hall but retaining its original seating. The main chapel has a raised platform to the north-east, and cast iron columns supporting the balcony.

== See also ==
- Listed buildings in Grassington
