= Bownas =

Bownas is a surname, and may refer to:

- Geoffrey Bownas (1923–2011), British academic specialist in Japanese studies
- Samuel Bownas (1676–1753), English Quaker minister
- Sheila Bownas (1925–2007), British textile designer and botanical illustrator
