= Listed buildings in Linton, North Yorkshire =

Linton is a civil parish in the county of North Yorkshire, England. It contains 23 listed buildings that are recorded in the National Heritage List for England. Of these, two are listed at Grade II*, the middle of the three grades, and the others are at Grade II, the lowest grade. The parish contains the village of Linton and the surrounding area. Most of the listed buildings are houses, cottages and farmhouses, and the others include a church and items in the churchyard, bridges, a barn converted for residential use, a set of almshouses, a public house, a milestone, three guide posts, and a telephone kiosk.

== Key ==
Grade	Criteria
II*	Particularly important buildings of more than special interest
II	Buildings of national importance and special interest

== Buildings ==
Name and location	Photograph	Date	Notes	Grade
St Michael's Church; 54.06505°N 1.99382°W		12th century	The church has been altered and extended through the centuries, including a restoration in 1861. It is built in stone with a stone slate roof, and consists of a nave with a clerestory, north and south aisles, a south porch, and a chancel with aisles. At the west end is a bellcote on two tiers of three corbels, with a cornice, paired round-arched bell openings with moulded surrounds, and a pyramidal roof with a cross finial.	II*
Sundial and grave slab, St Michael's Church; 54.06490°N 1.99392°W	—	1637	The sundial and grave slab are in the churchyard to the south of the church, and are in limestone and gritstone. The sundial shaft is about 80 centimetres (31 in) high, and is set into a square plinth on three blocks. The east end rests on a block covering the west end of a narrow grave slab with an inscribed brass plaque.	II
Troutbeck and Beckside Cottage; 54.06018°N 2.00485°W		1642	The house, later divided into two, is in stone with quoins and a stone slate roof. There are two storeys, three original bays, and a later bay added to the left. The original doorway has a moulded quoined and chamfered surround, a basket-arched had, and a lintel containing a dated and initialled panel. Above is a continuous stepped hood mould. To the left is a doorway with a shallow triangular arch under a chamfered square head, with hollowed spandrels. The windows in the original bays are mullioned, and in the added bay are casement windows.	II
Clapper bridge 54.06017°N 2.00534°W		17th century or earlier	The clapper bridge carries a footpath over Linton Beck. It is in gritstone, and consists of three flat slabs carried on two stone piers and roughly-shaped blocks.	II
Tythe Barn; 54.06084°N 2.00732°W		17th century	A barn and outbuildings, later converted for residential use, in stone with a stone slate roof, and approximately seven bays. On the front are a porch to the left, doorways and a former cart entrance, all with chamfered and quoined surrounds, and three tiers of round-headed slit vents.	II
White Abbey; 54.06184°N 2.00572°W		17th century	The house is in grey gritstone, with quoins, and a stone slate roof with bulbous kneelers and gable copings. There are two storeys and four bays. The doorway has a fanlight, and the windows on the front are mullioned. At the rear are two projecting parallel-roofed service wings with sash windows.	II
Yew Tree Cottage and Fell View; 54.05985°N 2.00646°W		17th century	A house, later divided into two, in grey limestone, with quoins and a stone slate roof. There are two storeys and four bays. The original doorway, now blocked, has a moulded chamfer to the quoined jambs, and a window has been inserted. To the right are two later inserted doorways. In the left bay are original mullioned windows, and the other bays contain later square windows.	II
Linton Hall; 54.06088°N 2.00667°W		Mid to late 17th century	The house, which was extended in the 18th century, is in stone, with quoins, a stone slate roof and an L-shaped plan. The original range has two storeys and four bays, and contains a doorway with a chamfered quoined surround, small windows and mullioned windows. The later wing on the right projects, it is gabled and has three storeys. It contains a string course, sash windows in moulded architraves, and in the attic is a cross window. In the angle is a two-storey porch with a wavy gable. The doorway has a moulded architrave, a cornice with ball finials, and a semicircular pediment., and above is a cross window.	II
Sunnybank and the Post Office; 54.06041°N 2.00490°W		1679	A house, later divided into two houses, in limestone, with quoins, and a stone slate roof. There are two storeys and an irregular plan, with a gabled bay two bays deep, an added bay to the left, and a lower projecting half-bay to the right. The main doorway has a moulded chamfered surround, the moulding rising over the dated and initialled lintel, over which is a hood mould. The windows are mixed, some are mullioned, and others are casements.	II
Brows View; 54.05985°N 2.00474°W		Late 17th century	The house is in stone with a stone slate roof. There are two storeys and three bays. The main doorway has a moulded quoined surround, and a triangular-headed lintel, and there is a later doorway to the right. The ground floor windows are mullioned, and in the upper floor are sash windows.	II
Bridge at ford over Linton Beck; 54.06072°N 2.00541°W		Late 17th to early 18th century	The bridge carries a footpath over Linton Beck. It is in gritstone, and consists of a single shallow arch with a small flood arch to the east, both with voussoirs and a projecting drip course. The parapet has rounded coping.	II
Li'le Emily's Bridge; 54.06585°N 2.00082°W		Late 17th to early 18th century (probable)	The bridge carries a footpath over Captain Beck, it is in stone, and consists of a single slightly hump-backed arch with voussoirs. The bridge is paved with stone slabs, it has large blocks to the ridged parapet, and at the north end are two close-set stones forming a stile.	II
Fountaine's Hospital; 54.06012°N 2.00594°W		1712	Almshouses and a chapel in stone, with stone slate roofs, two storeys and seven bays. The middle bay projects, and at the rear is a two-storey chapel. In the centre is a doorway in a recessed semicircular arch with a moulded and rusticated surround. Above it is a cornice and a round-arched niche with imposts and panelled pilasters. Flanking this are giant pilasters carrying an entablature with triglyphs. Above is a massive cornice with urn-shaped finials flanking a bellcote with a lead cupola and a weathervane. Flanking the central bays are two-bay ranges and projecting pedimented wings.	II*
Fountaine Inn; 54.06049°N 2.00625°W		Mid 18th century	The public house is in whitewashed stone, with quoins, stone gutter brackets, and a stone slate roof. There are two storeys, a main range of three bays, and a lower two-storey bay and a lean-to on the right. The main range contains a doorway and sash windows. In the lower range is a casement window and a mullioned window above.	II
Linton House; 54.06152°N 2.00743°W		Late 18th century	The house is rendered, and has quoins, and a stone slate roof with shaped kneelers and stone copings. There are two storeys and seven bays, and a recessed half-bay on the right. Three steps lead to the central doorway that has a fanlight, pilasters, an entablature with paterae, and an open pediment with a cornice. The windows are sashes in architraves.	II
Milestone at Catch All Farm; 54.05249°N 2.02307°W		Late 18th to early 19th century	The milestone is a rectangular block of gritstone about 1 metre (3 ft 3 in) high and 60 centimetres (24 in) wide. On both faces are pointing hands, on the east face are the distances to Grassington and Skipton, and on the west face to Kettlewell and Threshfield.	II
Bow Bridge; 54.06542°N 2.00215°W		Early 19th century	The bridge carries a road over Captain Beck, it is in gritstone and consists of a single arch. This is flaked by pilasters carried up to parapet level, there is a projecting bank at road level, and the parapet has rounded coping.	II
Catch All Farmhouse; 54.05255°N 2.02290°W		Early to mid 19th century	The farmhouse is in stone, with quoins, stone gutter brackets, and a stone slate roof with hollow kneelers and gable coping. There are three storeys, three bays, a recessed full-height bay to the left, and a lower two-storey outbuilding on the right. The round-arched doorway has a fanlight, and the windows are sashes. The outbuilding contains square openings.	II
Grange Farmhouse; 54.05945°N 2.00449°W		Early to mid 19th century	The house is in stone with quoins and a stone slate roof. There are two storeys and two bays. The central doorway has a slightly projecting surround, a fanlight, imposts and a keystone, and the windows are mullioned.	II
Guide Post at SD 9979 6285; 54.06160°N 2.00472°W		Early to mid 19th century	The guide post at a junction on Lauradale Lane (B6265 road) is in gritstone. It is about 80 centimetres (31 in) high, with a triangular plan and a pointed top. On the left face is inscribed "GRASSINGTON" and on the right face "BURNSALL".	II
Guide Post at SD 9986 6309; 54.06377°N 2.00372°W		Early to mid 19th century	The guide post at the junction of Lauradale Lane (B6265 road) with the B6160 road is in gritstone. It is about 2 metres (6 ft 7 in) high, with a triangular plan and a pointed top. On the sides are pointing arrows, on the left face is inscribed "THRESHFIELD", "KILNSEY" and "BURNSALL", and on the right face is "GRASSINGTON" and "SKIPTON".	II
Guide Post at SE 0010 6293; 54.06236°N 1.99987°W		Early to mid 19th century	The guide post at a junction on the B6160 road is in gritstone. It is about 60 centimetres (24 in) high, with a triangular plan and a pointed top. On the left face is inscribed "LINTON" and "SKIPTON" and on the right face "KILNSEY" and "THRESHFIELD".	II
Telephone kiosk 54.06073°N 2.00614°W		1935	The K6 type telephone kiosk was designed by Giles Gilbert Scott. Constructed in cast iron with a square plan and a dome, it has three unperforated crowns in the top panels.	II
