= Grassington Town Hall =

Municipal building in Grassington, North Yorkshire, England

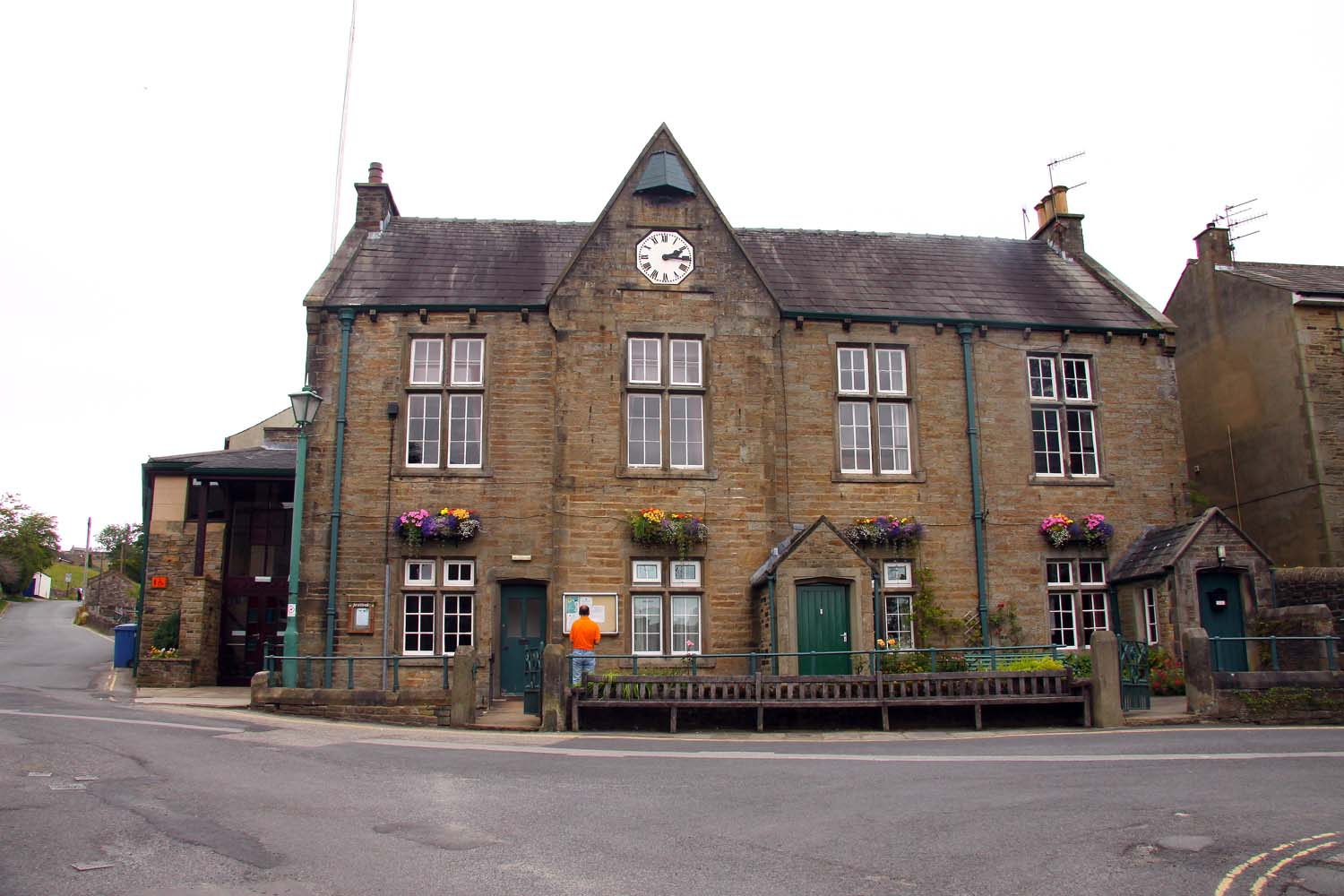
- The building in 2011

- Shown in North Yorkshire
- 54.0737°N 1.9961°W
- Location: Main Street, Grassington

History
- Built: 1855

Site notes
- Architectural style: Neoclassical style

Grassington Town Hall is a municipal building in Main Street, Grassington, a town in North Yorkshire, England. The complex is in three parts comprising the original building, a large assembly hall behind, and a theatre behind that. The complex is managed by the Grassington Devonshire Institute.

== History ==
The building was commissioned by William Cavendish, 6th Duke of Devonshire, whose local seat was at Bolton Abbey as a mechanics' institute for the town in the mid-19th century. The site he selected was open land on the east side of the village. It was designed in the neoclassical style, built in ashlar stone and was completed in 1855. The design involved an asymmetrical main frontage of four bays facing onto Main Street. The second bay from the left, which was slightly projected forward, was gabled and contained an octagonal clock face in the tympanum. All four bays were fenestrated by mullioned and transomed windows with the first floor windows taller than the ground floor windows. There were small porches with triangular rooves just to the right of the second bay and of the fourth bay. Internally, the principal rooms were a reading room and a concert room. The hour-striking clock was added in 1894: having been commissioned by the Duke of Devonshire from Blakeborough (clockmakers) of Keighley, it was manufactured for them by Potts of Leeds.

Spencer Cavendish, 8th Duke of Devonshire donated the building to the parish in 1896. By 1923, the building was considered to be too small and in need of renovation. A major extension at the rear of the original building, stretching along Moor Lane, was erected at a cost more than £4,000. The extension incorporated a much larger assembly hall, which was 80 feet (24 m) long and 35 feet (11 m) wide and was equipped with a stage. After the works had been completed the enlarged complex was officially re-opened by the Marquess of Hartington on 23 August 1923.

By 1931, the assembly hall was being used three nights a week as a cinema, and, on other occasions, as a venue for concerts and theatrical performances, as well as for public meetings: the inquest into the 1925 Dibbles Bridge coach crash in which 7 people died and 11 were injured took place there in June 1925.

A Charity, the Grassington Devonshire Institute, was established to manage the complex in 1960. In 1998, a new venue, the Octagon Theatre, was financed through the National Lottery and built on a site to the rear of the assembly hall. It was accessed along new corridors on either side of the assembly hall, and the main staircase was moved. The complex was refurbished during summer 2020, with new lighting and curtains installed, and subsequently re-opened with live operatic recordings from the Royal Opera House. In December 2023, the complex was awarded a £49,950 grant by the UK Government's Shared Prosperity Fund to replace part of the roof, install double glazing, and improve accessibility.
