= Linton, North Yorkshire =

Village and civil parish in North Yorkshire, England

Coordinates: 54.060743°N 2.005693°W

Linton

- Location within North Yorkshire
- Population: 176 (2011 census)
- OS grid reference: SD997627
- Civil parish: Linton
- Unitary authority: North Yorkshire
- Ceremonial county: North Yorkshire
- Region: Yorkshire and the Humber
- Country: England
- Sovereign state: United Kingdom
- Post town: SKIPTON
- Postcode district: BD23
- Police: North Yorkshire
- Fire: North Yorkshire
- Ambulance: Yorkshire

Linton is a village and civil parish in the county of North Yorkshire, England. The population as of the 2011 census was 176. It lies not far from Grassington, just south of the River Wharfe, and is 7 miles (11 km) north of Skipton. Linton Beck runs through the village and then joins the Wharfe at Linton Falls. The beck is crossed by two Grade II listed bridges on the village green, and is overlooked by Fountaine's Hospital, a Grade II* listed chapel and almshouse built in the style of Sir John Vanburgh. There is also a public house, the Fountaine Inn.

St Michael's Church, Linton, stands close to the River Wharfe.

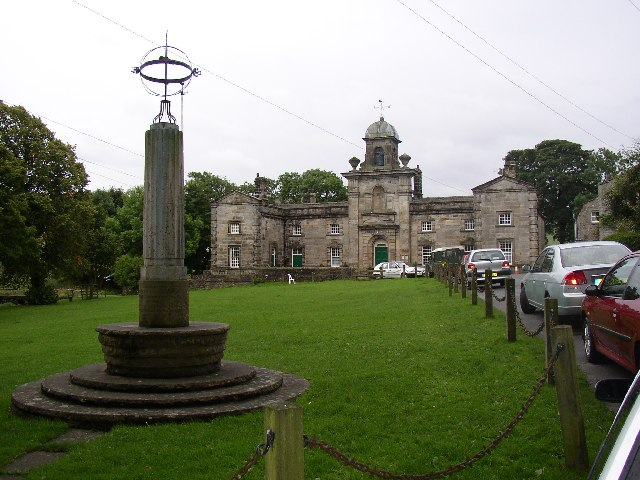
Fountaine's Hospital, funded by a bequest from Richard Fountaine

== History ==
The name Linton derives from the Old English līntūn meaning "settlement growing with flax".

Linton was historically a parish in Staincliffe Wapentake in the West Riding of Yorkshire. The ancient parish included the townships of Grassington, Hebden and Threshfield, all of which became separate civil parishes in 1866. Linton was transferred to North Yorkshire in 1974. From 1974 to 2023 it was part of the Craven District, it is now administered by the unitary North Yorkshire Council.

== Linton Falls ==
Linton Falls on the River Wharfe consists of a natural limestone waterfall (crossed by a footbridge) and a pair of artificial weirs. The Linton Falls hydroelectric plant was built above the falls in 1909 but later abandoned in 1948. In 2012 it was restored to generate electricity once more. Near the falls is a Grade II listed packhorse bridge over Linton Beck known as Little (or Li'le) Emily's Bridge.

== Notable people ==
- Sheila Bownas (1925–2007), textile designer and botanical illustrator

== See also ==
- Listed buildings in Linton, North Yorkshire

== Gallery ==
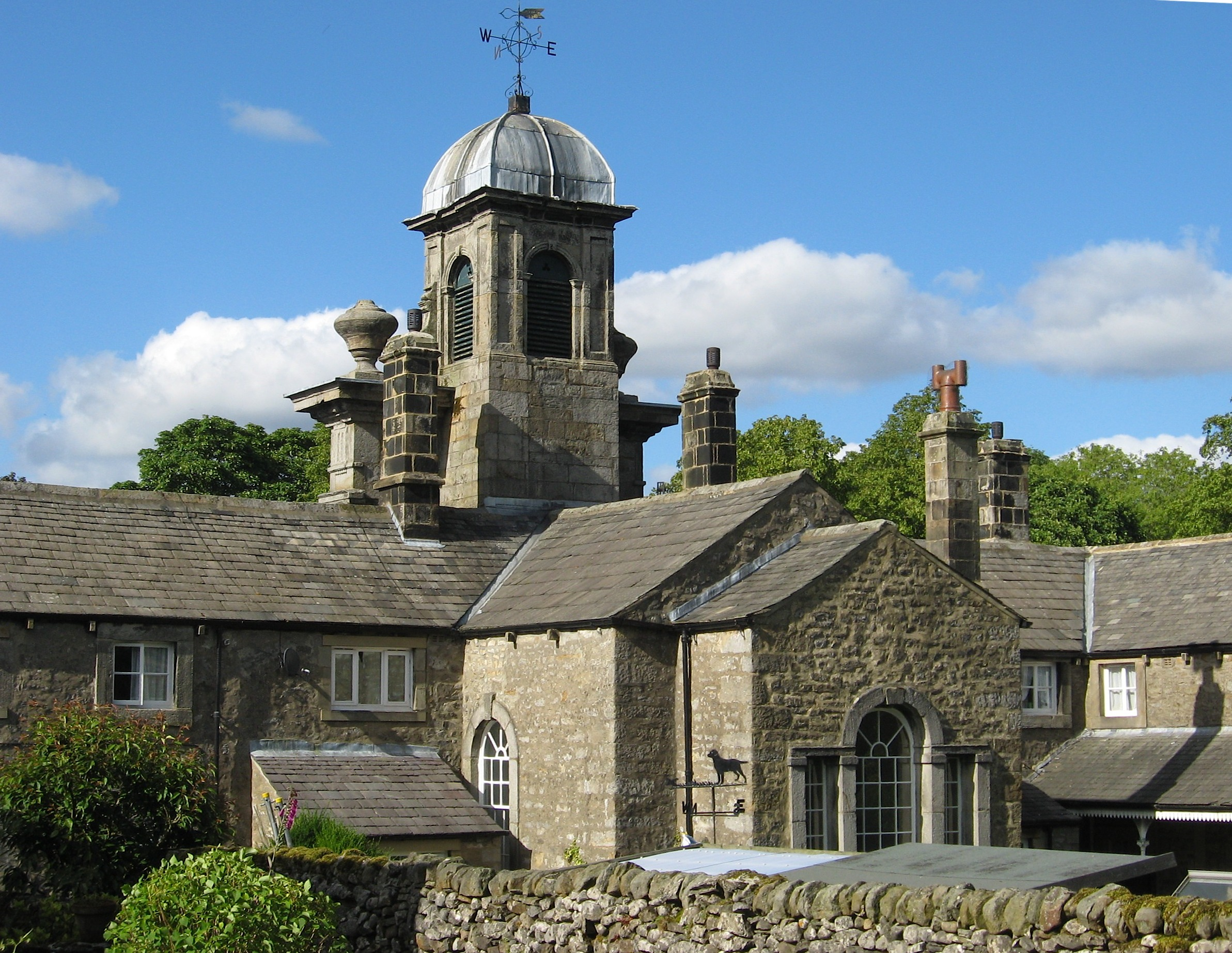
Fountaine's Hospital, back view, summer 2008

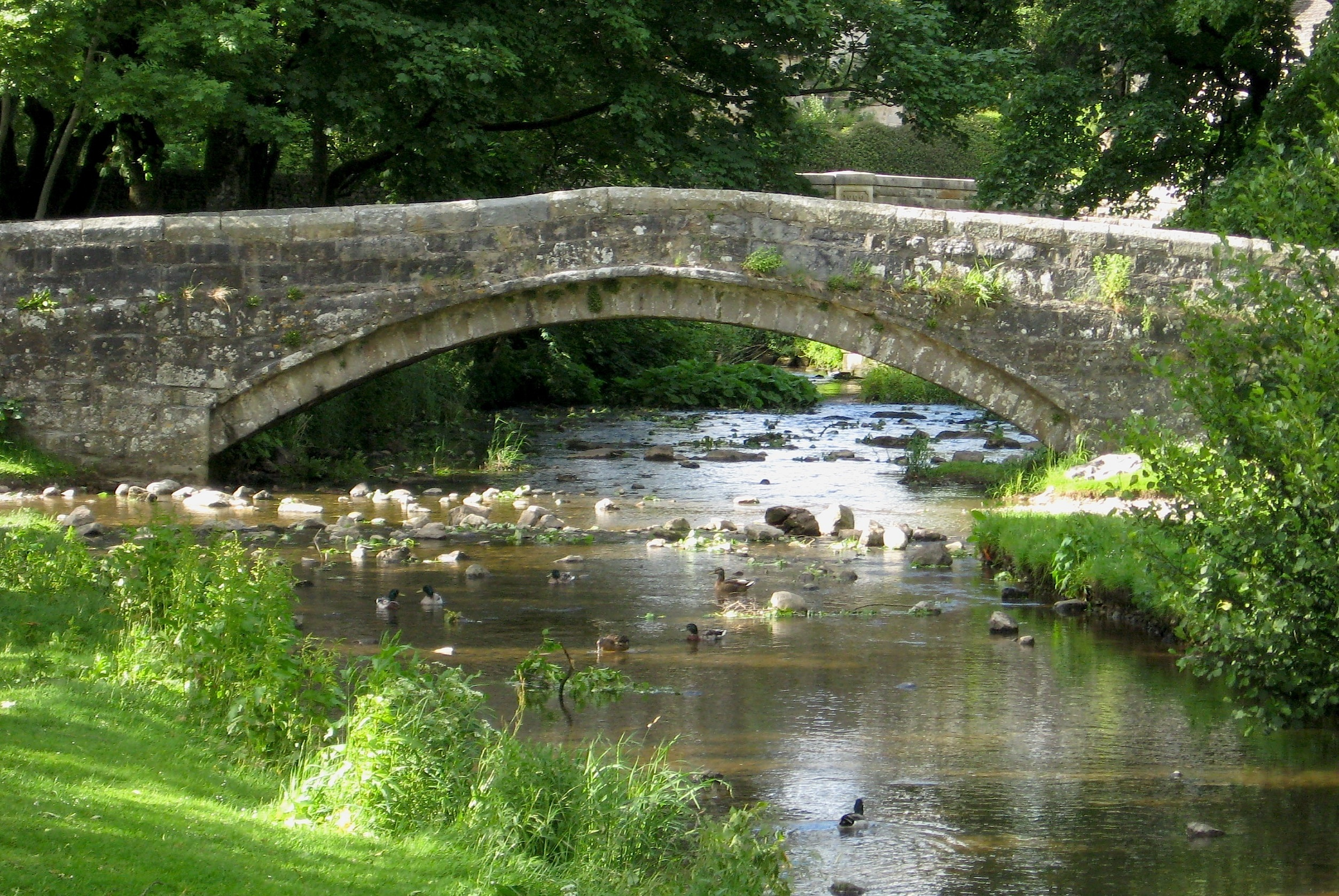
Two stone arch bridges on the village green

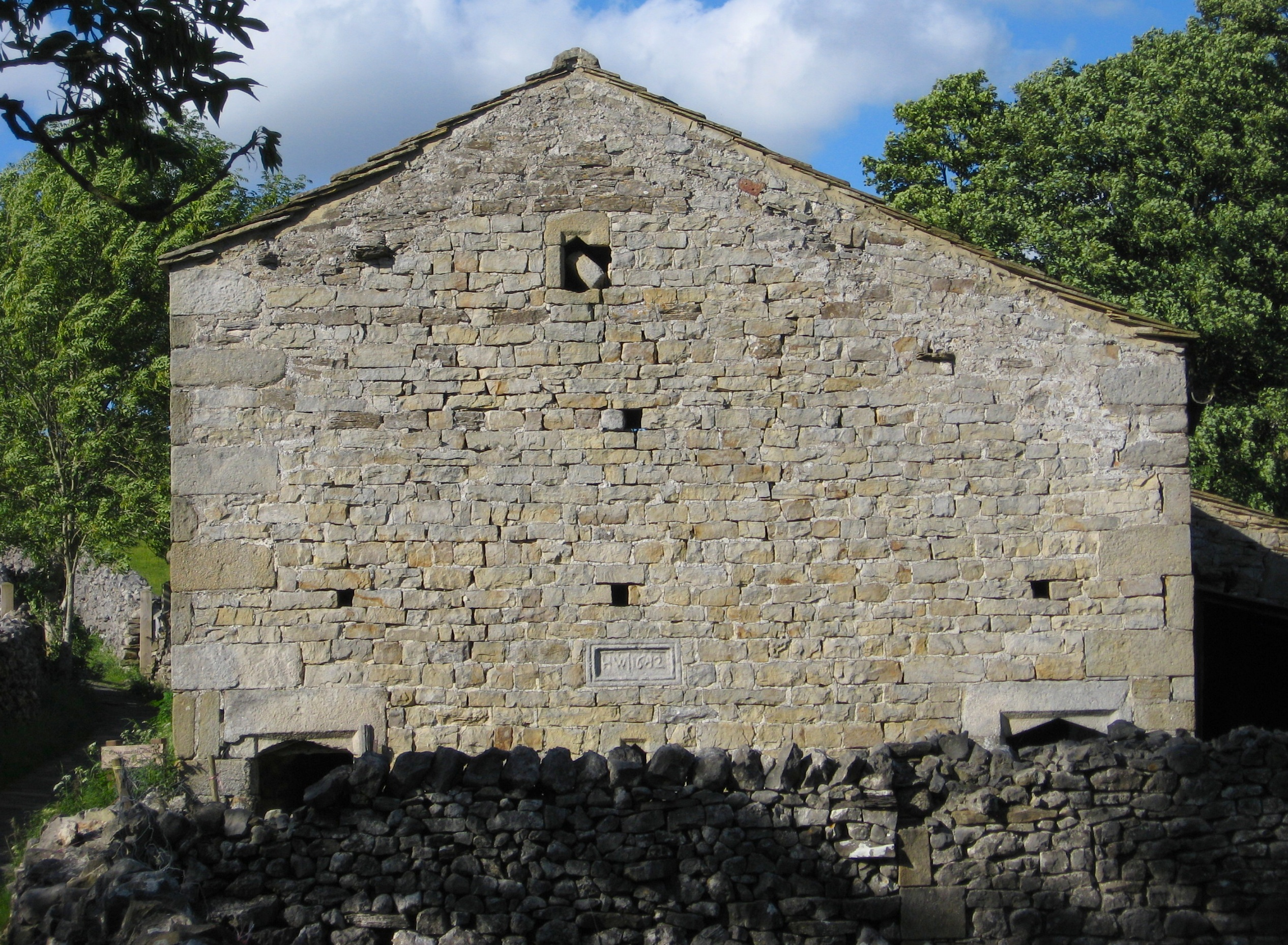
17th-century barn at Linton Falls

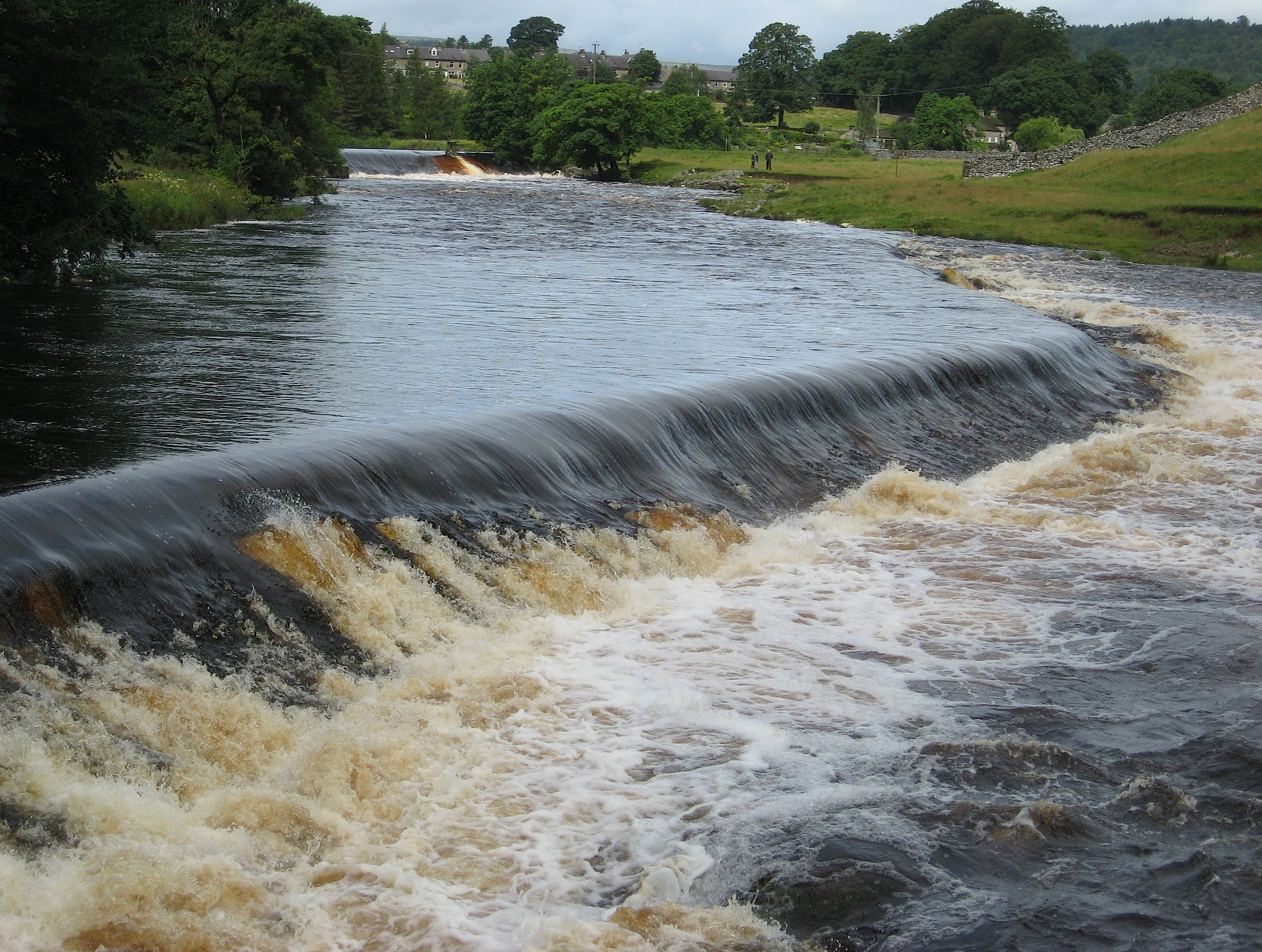
Upper weir, summer spate

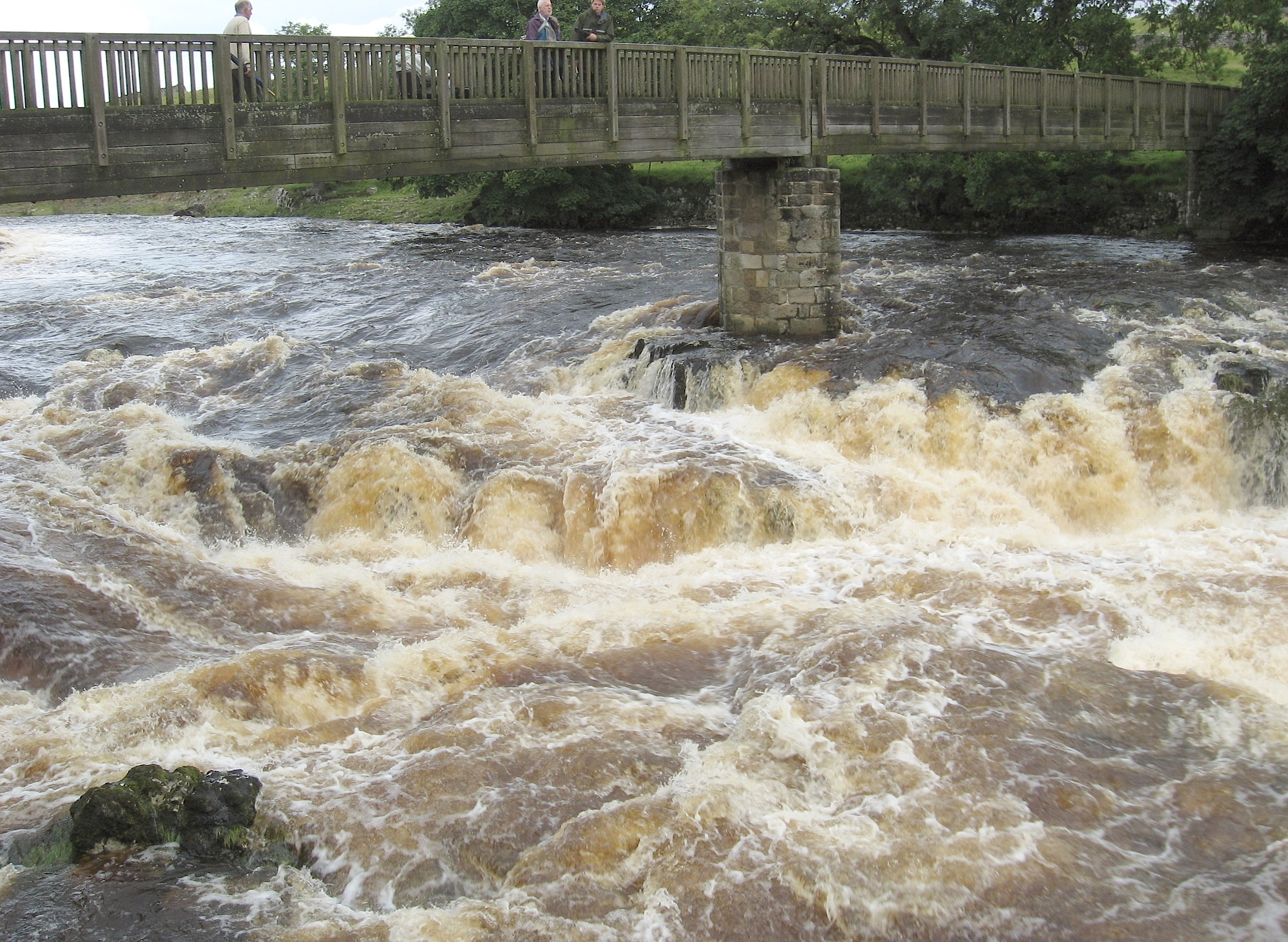
Linton Falls, summer spate

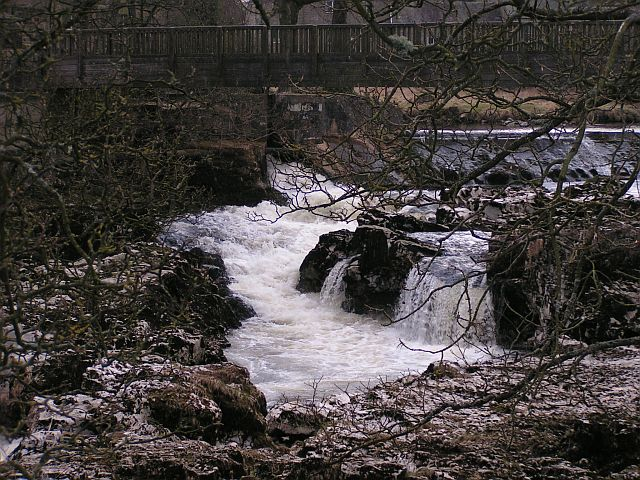
Winter view of Linton Falls from north bank

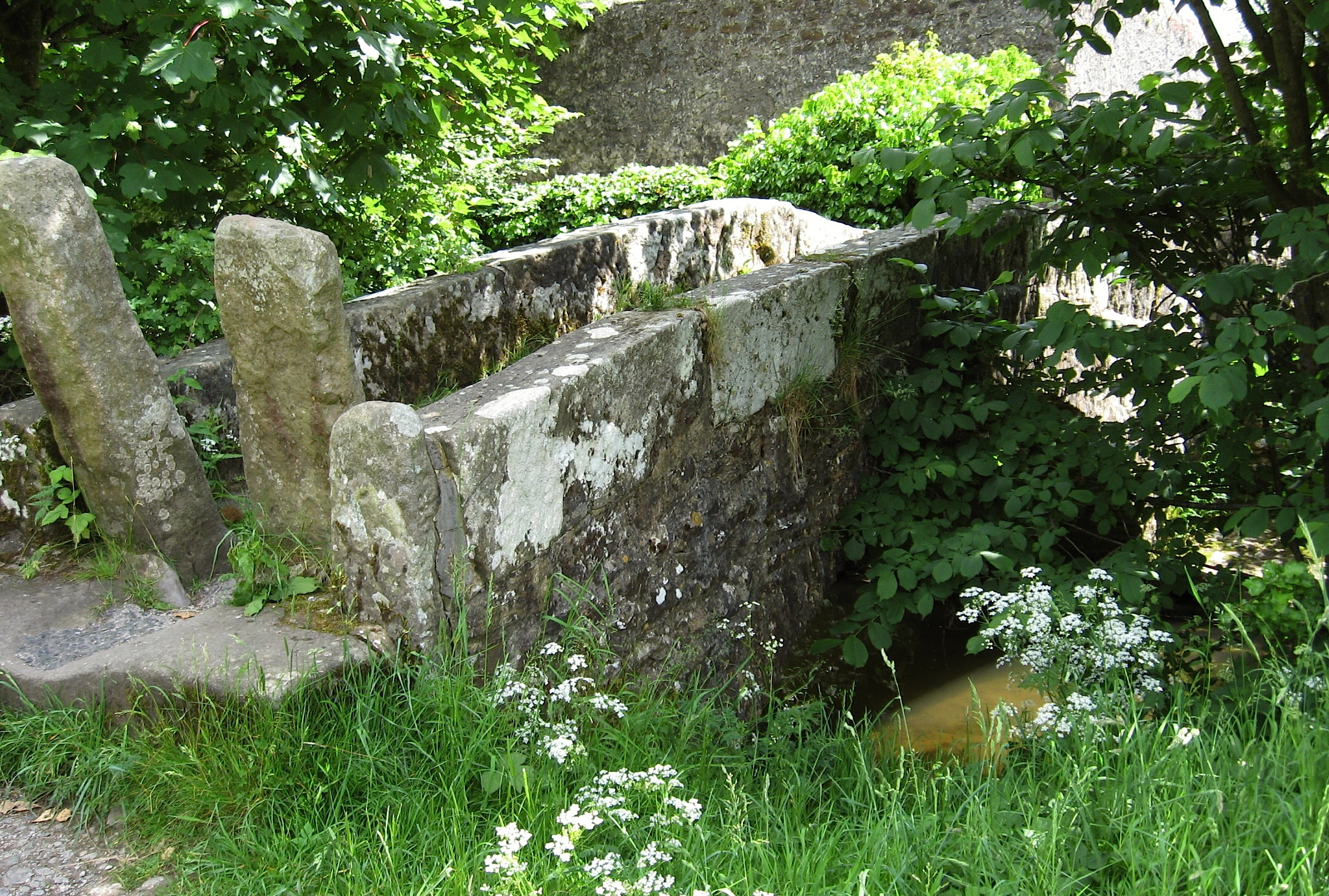
Little Emily's Bridge

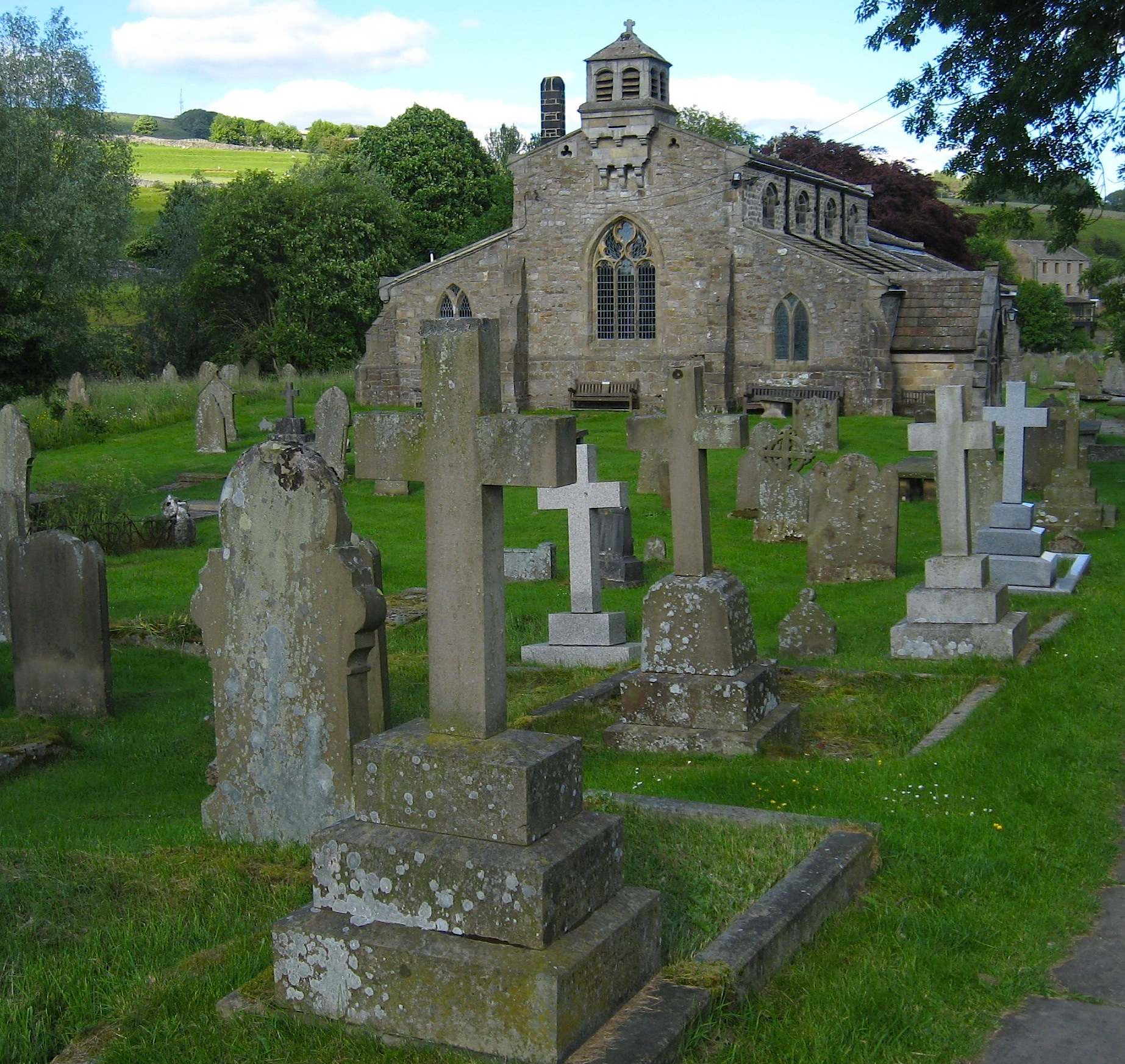
Linton Church of St Michael and All Saints

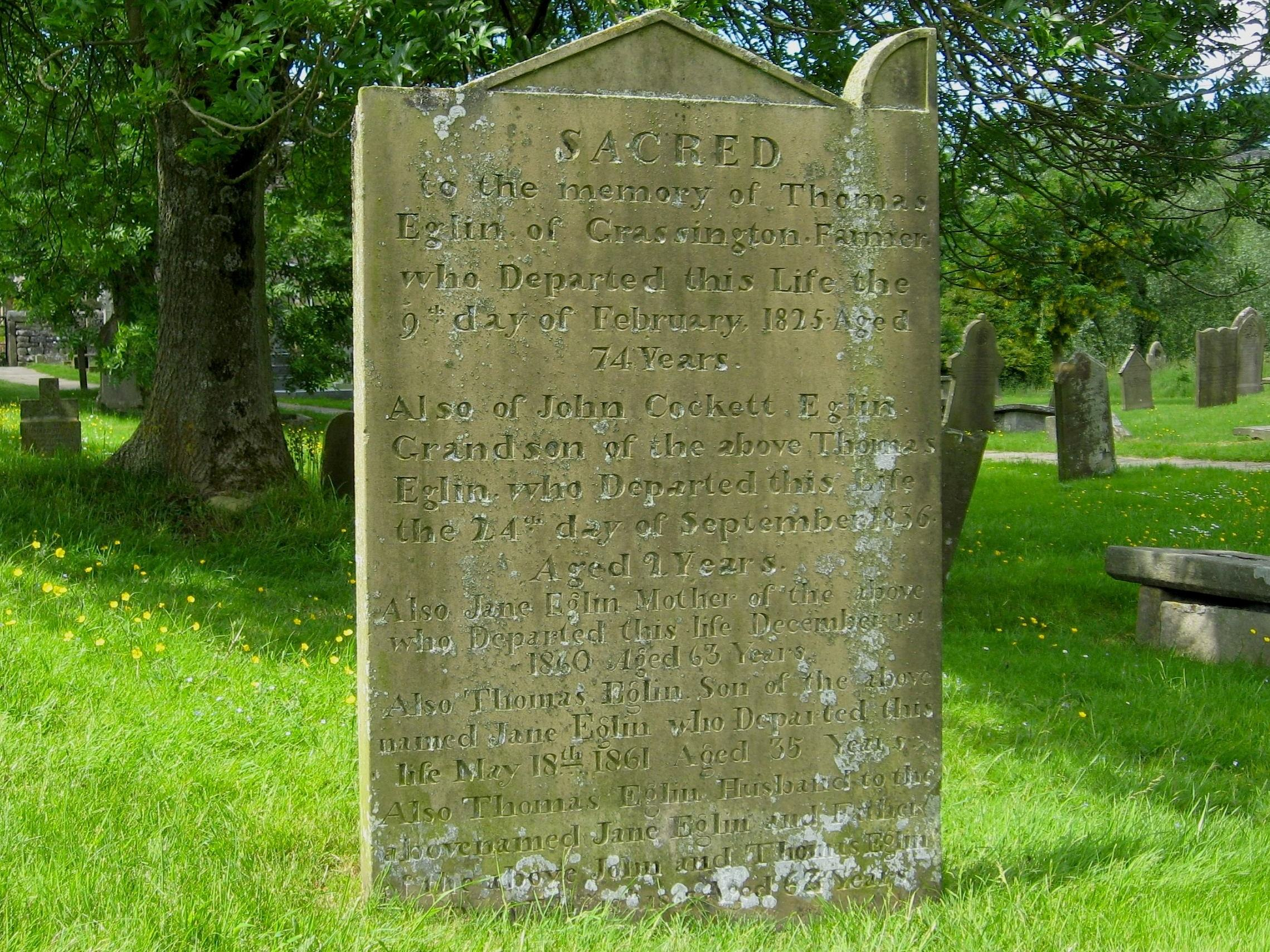
Sample story gravestone, Linton Churchyard

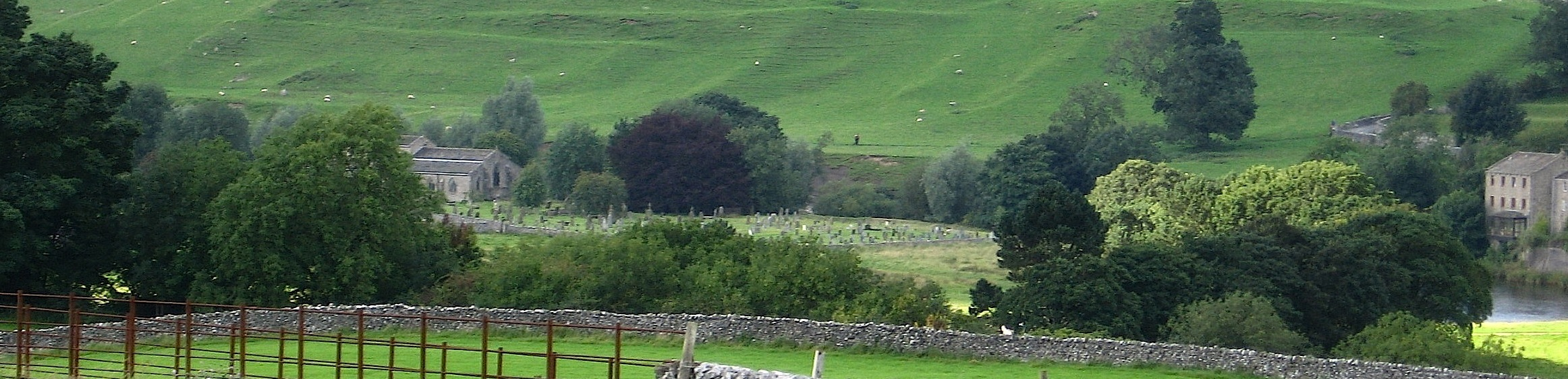
SE view of churchyard beside river and old mill site

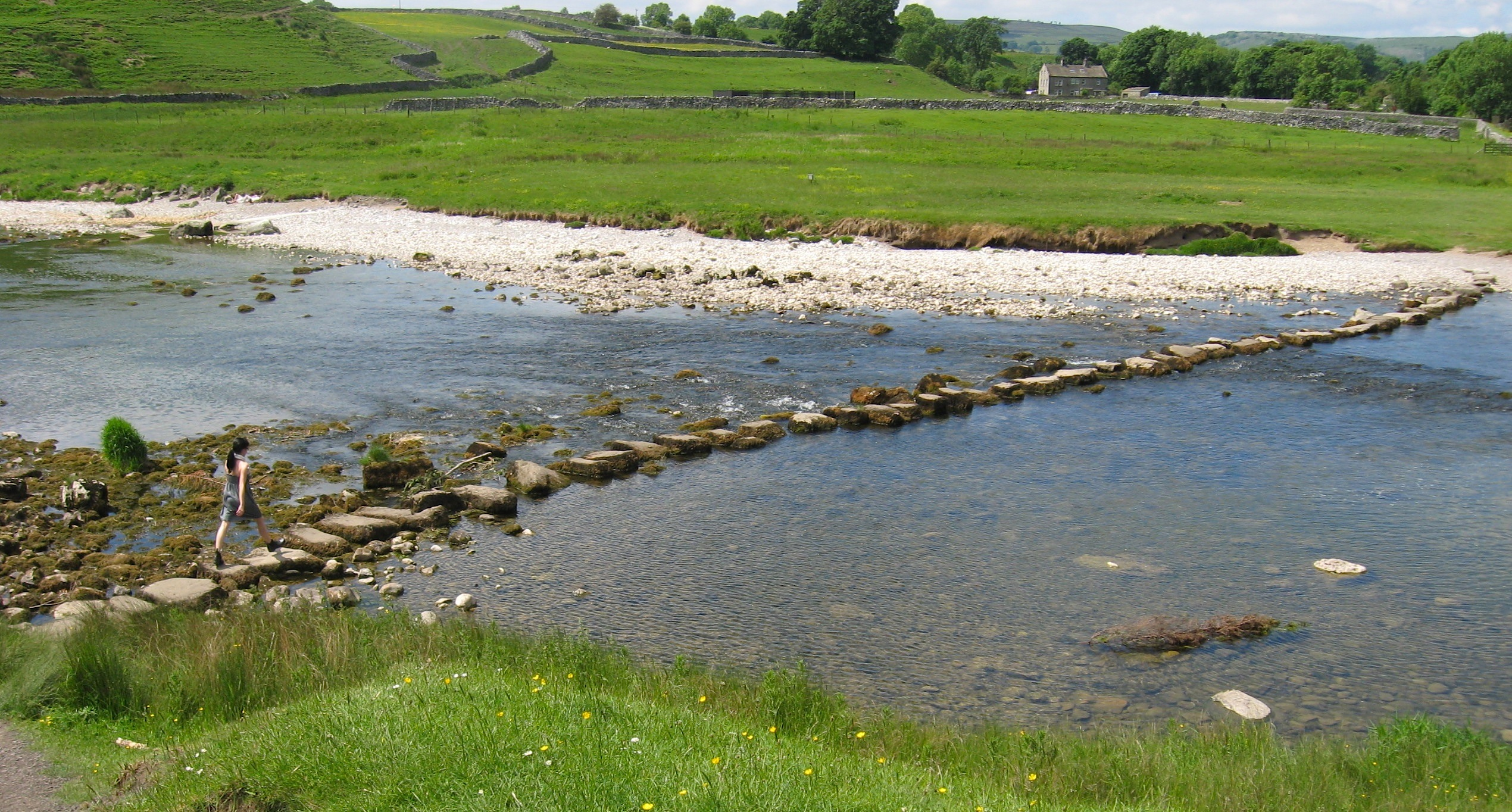
Stepping-stones course, low water, from east

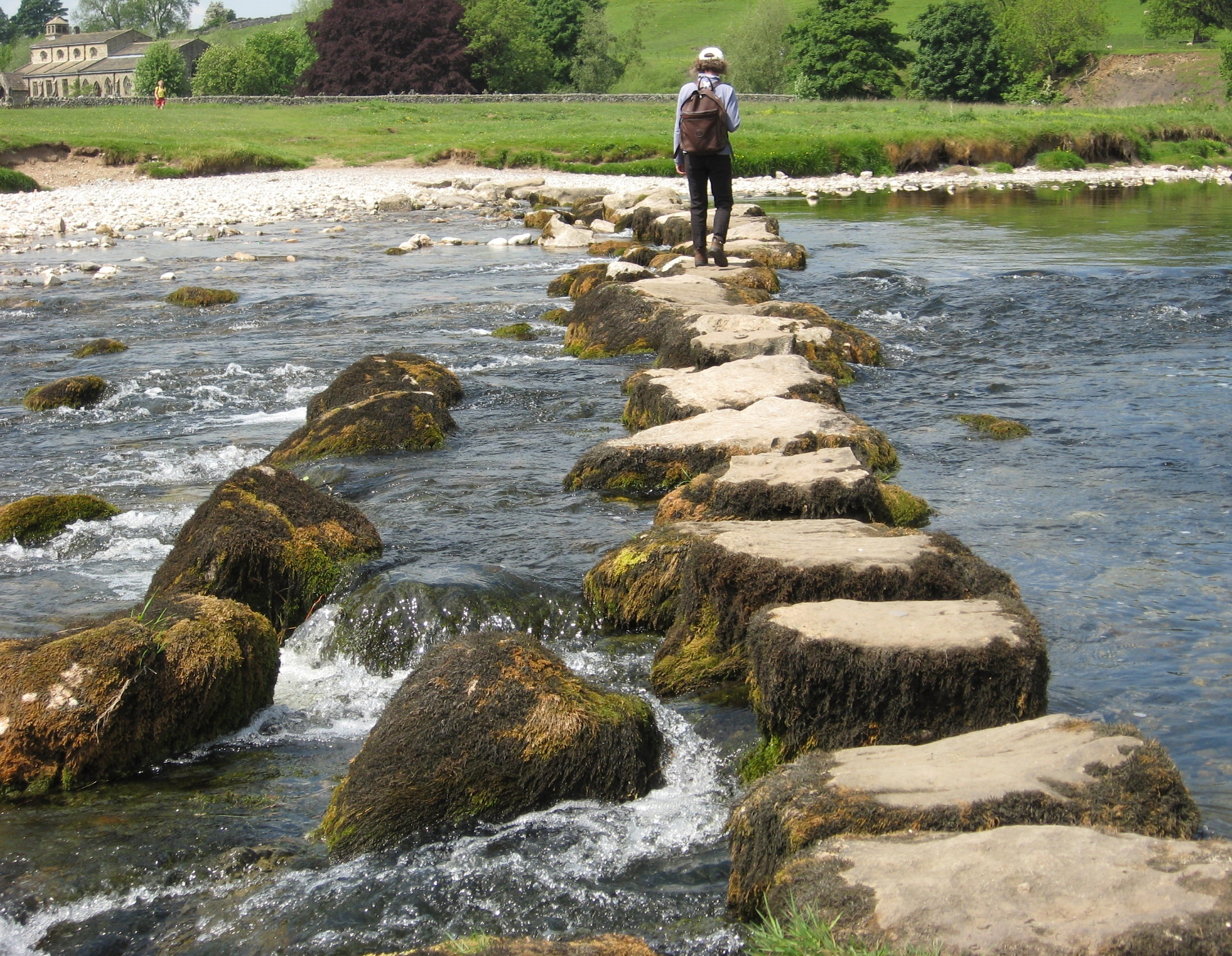
Dales Way walker's view of stepping-stones across Wharfe, toward Linton Church
