= Fountaine's Hospital =

Almshouses in Linton, North Yorkshire, England

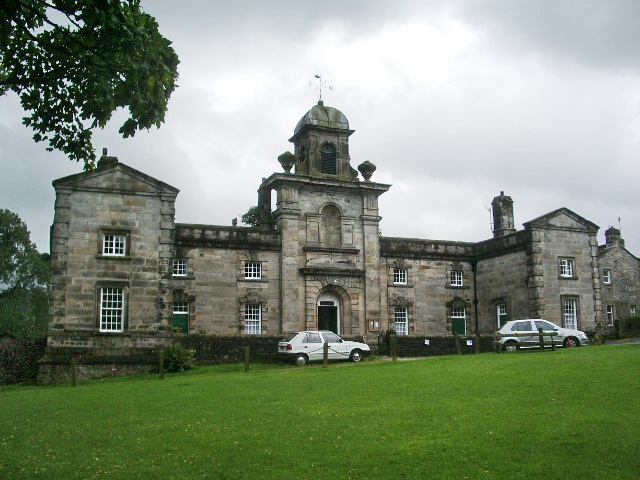
- The building, in 2008

- Location within North Yorkshire
- 54.0601°N 2.0059°W
- Location: Linton, North Yorkshire

History
- Built: 1721

Site notes
- Restored: 1810s

Listed Building – Grade II*
- Official name: Fountaines Hospital
- Designated: 10 September 1954
- Reference no.: 1132124

Fountaine's Hospital is a historic building in Linton, North Yorkshire, a village in England.

The almshouses were built in 1721 with a legacy from Richard Fountaine; initially there were four, flanking a chapel. Their architect is unknown; their design has been ascribed to John Vanbrugh or Nicholas Hawksmoor, but Historic England considers William Wakefield more likely. The building was restored in the 1810s, and was extended to the rear in 1892, adding two further almshouses. It was grade II* listed in 1954.

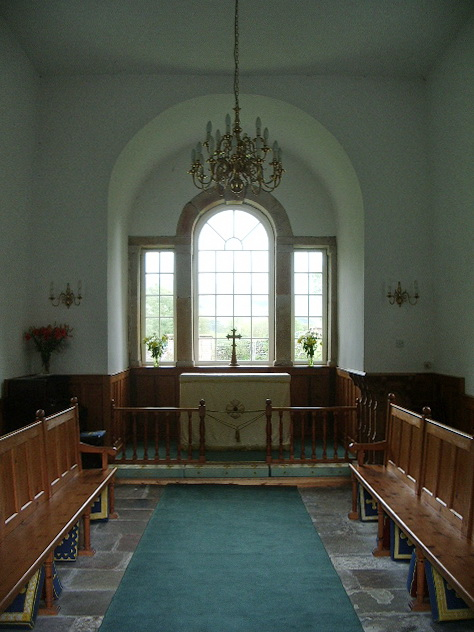
The chapel

The building is constructed of millstone grit, has stone slate roofs, two storeys and seven bays. The middle bay projects, and at the rear is a two-storey chapel. In the centre is a doorway in a recessed semicircular arch with a moulded and rusticated surround. Above it is a cornice and a round-arched niche with imposts and panelled pilasters. Flanking this are giant pilasters carrying an entablature with triglyphs. Above is a massive cornice with urn-shaped finials flanking a bellcote with a lead cupola and a weathervane. Flanking the central bays are two-bay ranges and projecting pedimented wings. Inside, the chapel fittings date from the 19th century.

== See also ==
- Grade II* listed buildings in North Yorkshire (district)
- Listed buildings in Linton, North Yorkshire
