= Linton Falls Hydro =

Hydro-electric plant on the River Wharfe, England

Linton Falls
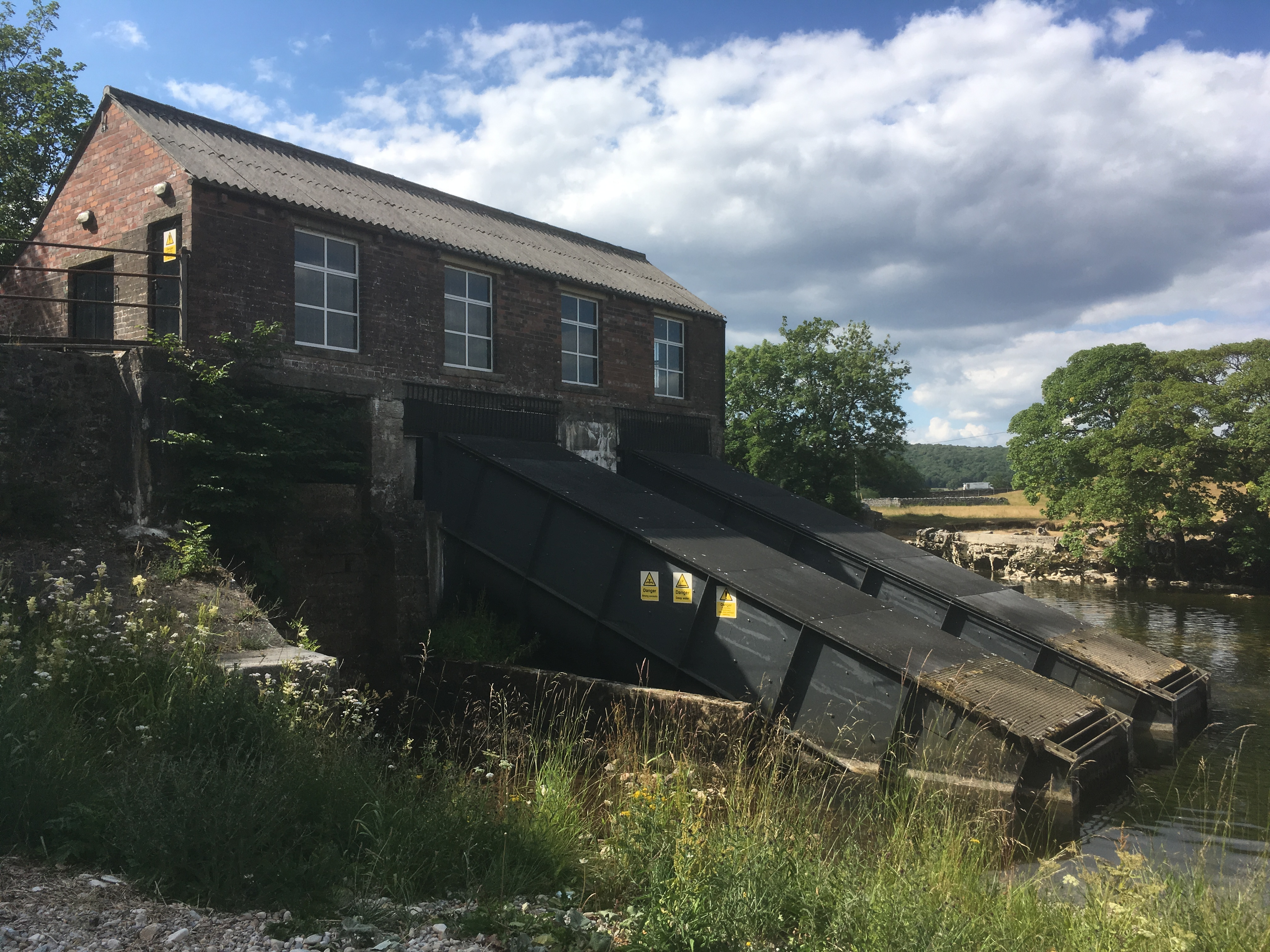
- Linton Falls Hydroelectric Power Station
- Country: England
- Location: Grassington, North Yorkshire
- Coordinates: 54.0671°N 2.0027°W
- Status: Operational
- Construction began: April 2011
- Commission date: March 2012
- Owner: JN Bentley

Power generation
- Annual net output: 500,000 kWh

External links
- Website: Company renewables page
- Commons: Related media on Commons

Linton Falls Hydro is a hydroelectric generating power station located on the Linton Falls Weir of the River Wharfe, near Grassington, North Yorkshire, England. The power station is located on the same site as a hydroelectric scheme that was first opened in 1909, but had closed by 1948. The new scheme, which opened in March 2012, uses the original building which is now a scheduled monument.

== History ==
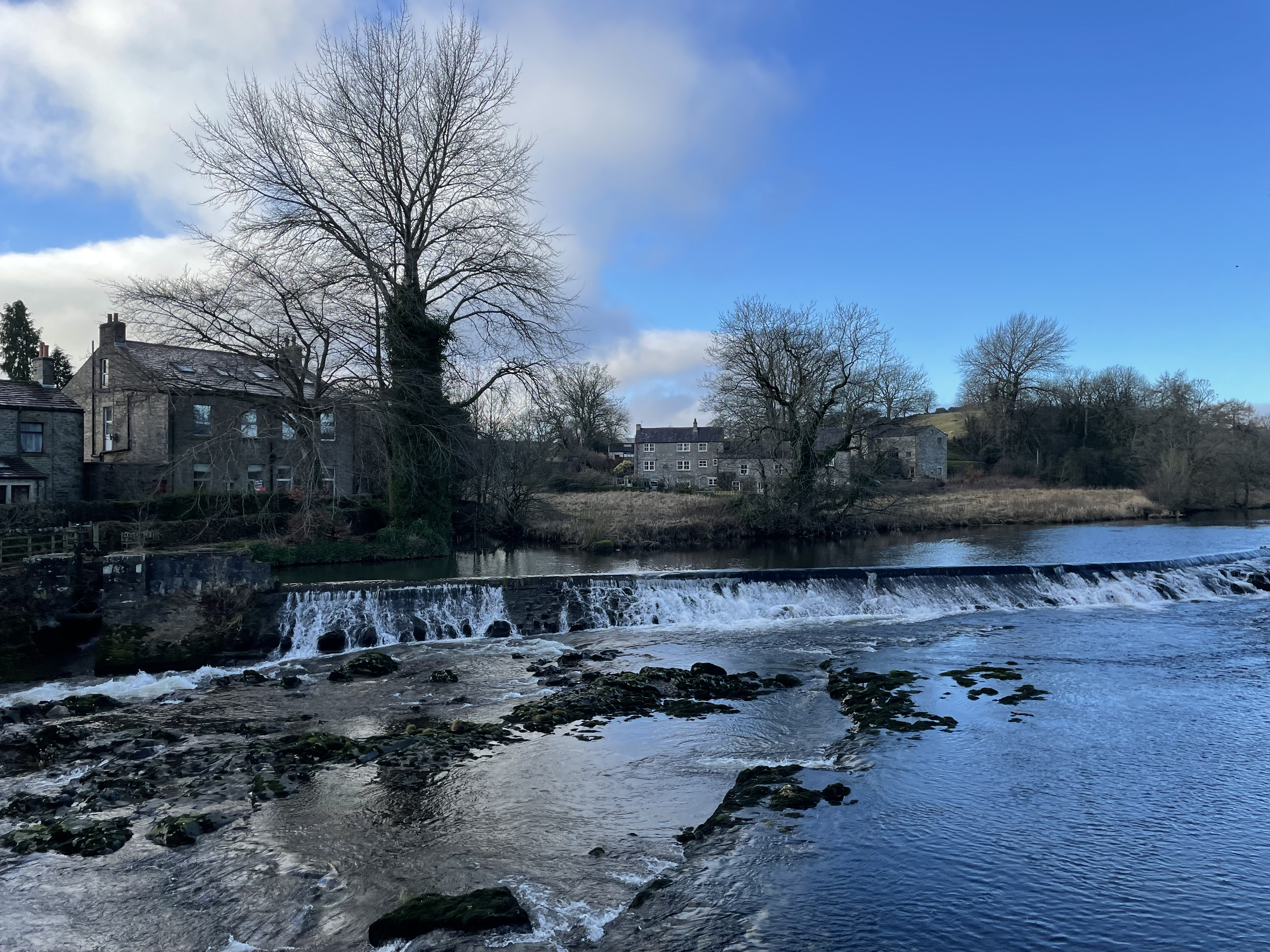
Linton Falls in 2022

The first hydroelectric plant at Linton Falls was constructed in 1909 by the Grassington Electric Supply Company. It leased the upper weir at Linton Falls, one of the two weirs on the River Wharfe, from the owners of Linton Mill and installed a generating plant. Both weirs built up a head of water to power Linton Mill which was located on the lower weir, 820 feet (250 m) downstream from the upper weir. The plant was installed with a capacity of 20 kilowatts which was distributed on cables across the Wharfe up to Grassington on the north bank of the river (some 2,000 feet (600 m) upstream). The power was distributed throughout the town on cables stayed and attached to the chimney stacks of the buildings in the town.

The hydro scheme struggled to keep pace with demand from nearby Grassington and the company went into liquidation in 1921. The owners of Linton Mill, formed a new concern called the Craven Hydro-electric Supply Company and they generated electricity up until 1948, (Note: The company was dissolved on 1 April 1948.) when the arrival of the National Grid made the scheme redundant. In 1946 the station delivered 1,089.4 MWh of electricity operating at a load factor of 48.5 per cent.

The 21st century owners of the site, a building and engineering firm based in Skipton, proposed returning the site to generating electricity in 2008. The first applications were submitted in 2009, with building starting on site in April 2011 and in March 2012, the £500,000 project was opened. The plant uses two screw turbines to generate the electricity. These were delivered to the site in July 2011 by the manufacturer Spaans Babcock. The company who developed the Linton Falls scheme has an agreement with Spaans Babcock who have supplied other screws to JN Bentley for other hydro projects.

The re-engineering of the plant also had to minimise the impact on the local wildlife, which included bats, white-clawed crayfish and fine-lined pea mussels. The mussels are very rare in Great Britain and are mostly confined to southern and central England; the presence of them in the River Wharfe is noted as being a "considerable outpost". Additionally, the screws are wide enough to allow small objects, such as leaves and fish, to pass through without coming to harm.

The hydroelectric building is now a scheduled monument, on account of it being an industrial building in the largely non-industrial Yorkshire Dales. The scheme was nominated in the 2012 English Heritage Angel Awards, which seeks to "recognise the devotion and expertise of volunteers and craftsmen who work on threatened buildings, monuments and other heritage sites".

== Details ==
- Number of screws = 2
- Diameter of each screw = 7 feet 10 inches (2.4 m)
- Head of water = 9 feet 2 inches (2.8 m)
- Maximum flow rate = 160 cubic feet (4.5 m^{3}) per second
- Installed capacity = 100 kilowatts
- Annual production = 500,000 kilowatt hours
- Homes powered = 90 – 122 (Note: Based upon an average family home with three bedrooms using typically 4,200 kilowatt hours per year.)
- Carbon dioxide saved = 216 tonnes (238 tons) – 258 tonnes (284 tons) per year
