= Grassington Hall =

House in Grassington, North Yorkshire, England

General information
- Type: Manor house
- Architectural style: Medieval first-floor hall with 17th-century additions
- Location: Wood Lane, Grassington, North Yorkshire, England
- Coordinates: 54.07244°N 1.99831°W
- Grid position: SE00209 64058
- Construction started: Late 13th century
- Client: Robert de Plumpton
- Owner: Private

Technical details
- Material: Coursed squared gritstone and rubble, stone slate roof

Listed Building – Grade II*
- Designated: 10 September 1954
- Reference no.: 1132153

Grassington Hall is a Grade II* listed manor house in Grassington, North Yorkshire, England. Originating in the late 13th century, it is widely considered to be the oldest continuously inhabited domestic building in the Yorkshire Dales.

== History ==
The manor of Grassington was held from the Percy family by Nigel de Plumpton in the late 12th century. His descendant, Robert de Plumpton, who was granted a charter to hold a market and fair in Grassington in 1282, is believed to have constructed the original medieval hall block around the 1280s. This initial build formed a traditional first-floor hall above an unvaulted undercroft.

In the 17th century, the property was substantially enlarged and rebuilt. Work undertaken for George Lister (d. c. 1632) and the Topham family extended the hall to the south-west and added a new gabled south-east facade facing towards the village. A large kitchen fireplace and stone service staircase were inserted into the medieval undercroft during this period.

During the 18th and 19th centuries, the upper hall rooms were partitioned. Around 1870, the building was extensively refurbished by the Duke of Devonshire's estate to provide a residence and offices for his principal lead mining agent. This work included replacing the roof and building a new main internal staircase.

Following a period of disrepair in the mid-20th century, the house underwent a comprehensive restoration by private owners in 1980.

== Architecture ==
Grassington Hall is constructed from coursed squared gritstone and rubble with a stone slate roof featuring bulbous kneelers, gable copings, and ball finials. The plan consists of two parallel two-storey ranges with attic space.

=== South-east elevation ===
The principal facade faces south-east toward the village. The left bay contains a two-storey gabled porch featuring a pointed stone arch with quoined jambs. The central bay contains a tall five-light recessed hollow-chamfered mullion window on the ground floor, and two two-light cross-windows on the upper floor with plate tracery pierced by a quatrefoil motif. The right bay features matching four-light and three-light mullioned windows.

=== North-west elevation ===
The north-west facade retains significant medieval masonry in its central gabled bays. The first-floor gable end of the original 13th-century block contains an intact paired lancet window set beneath a single stone chamfered head. Internal features include a large 17th-century hearth with incised lintel voussoirs (narrowed in the 18th century), an intact wall oven, a stone newel staircase, and a chamfered bressumer beam over the lower hearth.

Grassington Hall was designated as a Grade II* listed building on 10 September 1954 under National Heritage List for England entry 1132153.

== See also ==
- Grade II* listed buildings in North Yorkshire
- Grassington
- Yorkshire Dales
- Listed buildings in Grassington
