= St Michael's Church, Linton =

Church in Linton, North Yorkshire, England

- Church of St Michael and All Saints
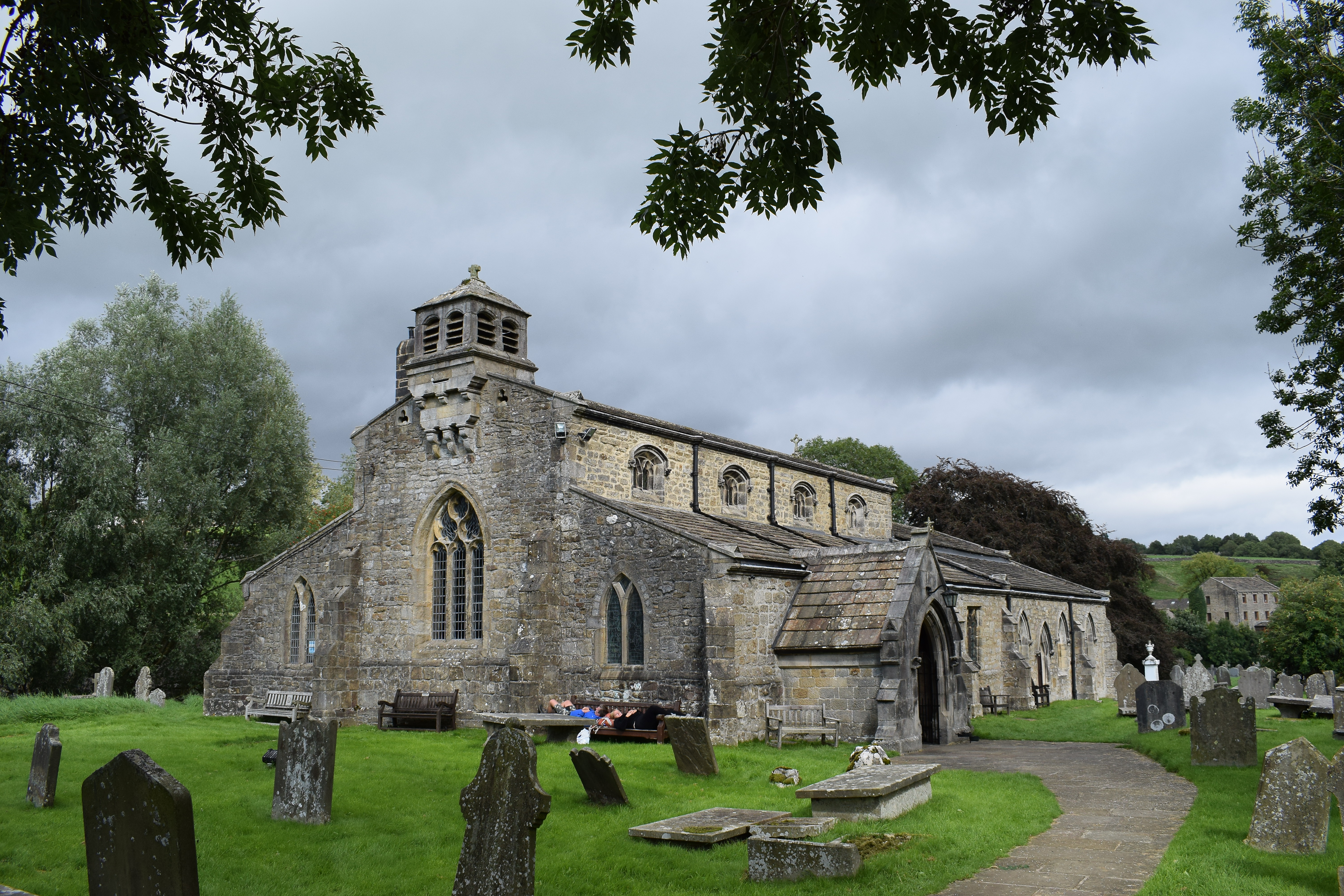
- The church, in 2018

- Location of St Michael's Church, Linton, in North Yorkshire
- 54.0650°N 1.9937°W
- OS grid reference: SE 00508 63229
- Country: England
- Denomination: Church of England
- Website: linton-burnsall-rylstone.com

History
- Dedication: St Michael and All Angels

Administration
- Diocese: Leeds
- Parish: Linton

Listed Building – Grade II*
- Official name: Church of St Michael and All Angels
- Designated: 10 September 1954
- Reference no.: 1167172

St Michael's Church is the parish church of Linton, North Yorkshire, a village in England.

The oldest part of the church is the 12th-century north arcade, while the chancel arch and south arcade are 13th century. The chancel was rebuilt in about 1350, and in the 15th century most of the windows were replaced and a clerestory was added. The church was restored by John Varley in 1861, who added the south porch and rebuilt the bellcote with the original stones. The building was grade II* listed in 1954.

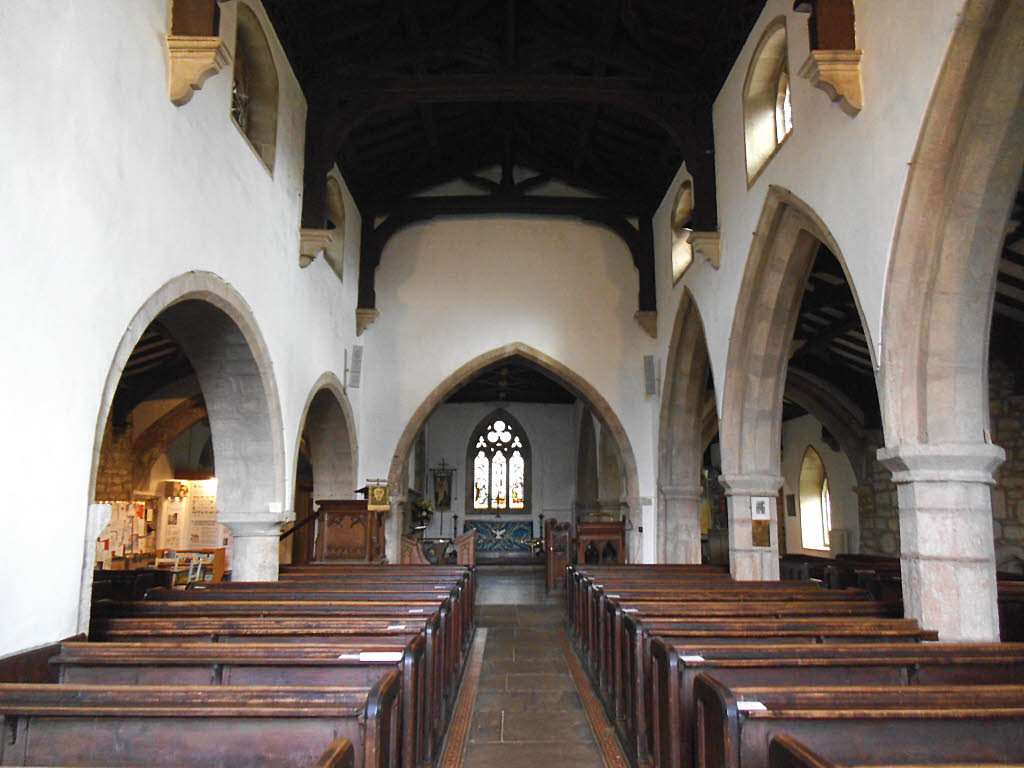
View from the nave into the chancel

The church is built of stone with a stone slate roof, and consists of a nave with a clerestory, north and south aisles, a south porch, and a chancel with aisles. At the west end is a bellcote on two tiers of three corbels, with a cornice, paired round-arched bell openings with moulded surrounds, and a pyramidal roof with a cross finial. Inside, there is a 12th-century cylindrical stone font, while all the other fitting date from the 1861 restoration.

== See also ==
- Grade II* listed churches in North Yorkshire (district)
- Listed buildings in Linton, North Yorkshire
