= Listed buildings in Grassington =

Grassington is a civil parish in the county of North Yorkshire, England. It contains 29 listed buildings that are recorded in the National Heritage List for England. Of these, one is listed at Grade II*, the middle of the three grades, and the others are at Grade II, the lowest grade. The parish contains the village of Grassington and the surrounding countryside and moorland. To the northeast of the village is the area of Yarnbury, at one time the site of lead mining, and remaining structures associated with the industry are listed. Most of the other listed buildings are houses, cottages and associated structures, farmhouses and farm buildings. The rest include a bridge, a milestone, a hotel, two churches and associated structures, and a water pump.

== Key ==
Grade	Criteria
II*	Particularly important buildings of more than special interest
II	Buildings of national importance and special interest

== Buildings ==
Name and location	Photograph	Date	Notes	Grade
Grassington Hall; 54.07246°N 1.99836°W	—	Late 13th century	A house that has been extended and restored during the centuries, it is in gritstone, with quoins, and a stone slate roof with bulbous kneelers, gable copings and ball finials. There are two storeys and attics, two parallel ranges, and fronts of two and three bays. Most of the windows are mullioned with hood moulds. In the left bay of the main front is a two-storey porch containing a pointed arch with a chamfered surround and quoined jambs.	II*
11 Scar Street; 54.07177°N 1.99571°W	—	1623	The house is in gritstone with quoins and a stone slate roof. There are two storeys, three bays and a rear outshut. The doorway has a plain surround, there is one sash window, and the other windows are mullioned.	II
8 and 10 Town Head; 54.07626°N 1.99901°W		Mid 17th century	A house divided into two, in gritstone, with quoins, and a stone slate roof with gable copings and bulbous kneelers. There are two storeys and three bays, the middle bay projecting as a gabled wing. In the left bay is a doorway and casement windows, all with chamfered surrounds. The windows elsewhere are chamfered and mullioned. In the left return is a doorway with a chamfered quoined surround.	II
Grassington Bridge; 54.07068°N 2.00444°W		17th century	The bridge, which was widened in 1780, and partly rebuilt in 1824, carries Station Road (B6265 road) over the River Wharfe. It is in gritstone, and consists of four segmental arches with recessed voussoirs, and is about 50 metres (160 ft) long. The bridge has pointed cutwaters carried up as pilasters, a string course, a band, and a parapet with slightly ridged coping.	II
Pletts Barn; 54.07294°N 1.99644°W		Mid 17th century	A barn, later used for other purposes, in gritstone, with quoins, and a stone slate roof with gable copings. There are three bays, the middle bay projecting under a catslide roof. The left bay contains a door with chamfered quoined jambs, a date plaque above, and two tiers of vents. The middle bay has an entrance with quoined jambs, and to the right is a chamfered slit vent, and three rows of pigeon holes with ledge perches. In the right bay is a doorway with a loading door above.	II
Rathmell Fold; 54.07453°N 1.99702°W		17th century	A house divided into two, it is in stone, with quoins, and a stone slate roof with moulded kneelers and gable ]coping. There are two storeys and three bays, the left bay projecting and gabled. The blocked doorway in the middle bay has chamfered quoined jambs and a basket-arched lintel, and there is a doorway with a plain surround to the right. Some windows are mullioned, some mullions have been removed, and other windows have been inserted.	II
Town Head Farmhouse; 54.07641°N 1.99930°W		Mid 17th century	The farmhouse is in gritstone, with quoins, eaves decorated with plaster and pebbles, and a grey slate roof with gable coping on the right. There are two storeys and three bays, and an added bay on the left. On the front is a two-storey gabled porch containing a doorway with a chamfered quoined surround. Throughout, there are recessed chamfered mullioned windows with hood moulds. In the added bay are double doors, and a square loading door above.	II
Ashfield House; 54.07277°N 1.99785°W		Late 17th century	A house, later a hotel, in grey gritstone, with quoins, shaped gutter brackets, and a stone slate roof. There are two storeys, three bays, and an added bay on the right. The doorway has a chamfered quoined surround, and there are two doorways converted into windows. On the main part are chamfered mullioned windows, and in the right bay is a sash window. On the right are external steps leading to a board door, under which is a dog kennel.	II
2, 4 and 6 Chamber End Fold; 54.07381°N 1.99659°W		1685	A house, later altered and divided into three, in gritstone, with stone gutter brackets, and stone slate roofs with shaped gable coping. No. 2 has three storeys and the others have two, and each house has two bays. The doorway of No. 2 has a quoined surround, a shallow triangular doorhead, and above it is a plaque in a stone frame with initials and dates. The other doorway have plain surrounds. The windows are varied, some are mullioned, and there are sashes and casements, some with hood moulds.	II
Church House; 54.07182°N 1.99816°W		1694	A house, later used for other purposes, in gritstone with a stone slate roof. There are two storeys, three bays, and a projecting gabled bay on the right. In the centre is a doorway with a chamfered quoined surround, and a lintel with a segmental arch, containing initials and heart motifs. Throughout are chamfered mullioned windows with hood moulds, on the ground floor continuous and stepped over the openings. In the upper floor is a square plaque, initially containing a sundial, later a clock. The right bay contains 20th-century openings.	II
53 Main Street; 54.07348°N 1.99689°W	—	Early 18th century	The house is in grey gritstone, with quoins on the right, and a stone slate roof with gable copings and slightly bulbous kneelers. There are two storeys and three bays. The doorway has an architrave with an entablature and a cornice. To the left is a doorway with a plain surround, and another possible doorway converted into a window.	II
12 and 14 Chamber End Fold; 54.07387°N 1.99719°W		Early to mid 18th century	A house divided into two, in gritstone, with a large quoin on the right, and a stone slate roof. There are two storeys and two bays. The original doorway has an eared architrave, a cornice, and a recess above, and there is an inserted door to the right with a plain surround. The windows have architraves and two or three lights.	II
Bank Cottage; 54.07465°N 1.99663°W		Mid 18th century	A pair of cottages combined into a house, in gritstone with a stone slate roof. There are two storeys and two bays. In the centre are paired doorways with a large lintel, the right doorway blocked, and in front is a later gabled porch. The windows are mullioned with two lights.	II
1A, 1B and 2 Broughton Fold; 54.07171°N 1.99736°W	—	1754	A house or workshop, later two houses and a flat, in gritstone, with quoins, stone gutter brackets, and a stone slate roof. There are three bays, the left two with three storeys and the right bay with two. On the front are two doorways, the left with a chamfered surround. Most of the windows are mullioned.	II
Grassington House Hotel; 54.07196°N 1.99737°W		Mid to late 18th century	A house, later a hotel, in brown-grey limestone, with rusticated quoins, moulded gutter brackets, and a stone slate roof with gable coping and a kneeler on the right. There are three storeys, a main block with three bays, and a projecting three-bay block with a hipped roof. In the centre of the main block is a doorway in an architrave, the windows in the lower two floors are sashes, and in the top floor are casements.	II
Yarnbury Cottage; 54.08913°N 1.97914°W	—	Late 18th century (possible)	A house in gritstone, with quoins on the right, stone gutter brackets, and a grey slate roof with a kneeler and gable coping on the right. There are two storeys and two bays. In the centre is a porch, and the windows have slightly projecting plain stone surrounds.	II
Yarnbury House; 54.08906°N 1.97905°W		Late 18th century (probable)	The house, which was extended in the 19th century, is in grey gritstone, with quoins, stone gutter brackets, and a grey slate roof with plain kneelers and gable copings. There are two storeys, originally two bays, and two bays added to the left. In the second bay is a gabled porch consisting a round-headed doorway with a plain surround, a fanlight and a keystone. All the windows are small-paned, the window above the porch larger.	II
Milestone; 54.06475°N 1.97769°W		1787	The milestone on the south side of the B6265 road is in sandstone, and is about 60 centimetres (24 in) high. It has a triangular section, it is inscribed with letters and numbers, and parts are badly damaged.	II
Black Horse Hotel; 54.07238°N 1.99697°W		Late 18th to early 19th century	The hotel is in gritstone, rendered on the front, with quoins, and a stone slate roof with gable copings and moulded kneelers. There are three storeys, three bays, and an added projecting lean-to bay on the right. The doorway has a plain surround and a flat hood on brackets. To its left is a two-light mullioned window, and to the right is a single-light window. The middle floor contains sash windows, and in the top floor are square windows with casements.	II
Powder House; 54.08883°N 1.97899°W		Late 18th to early 19th century	The former powder store for the lead mines is in gritstone, and is now a ruin. It has a square plan, a single storey, and a pyramidal roof. On the north side is a small square opening.	II
The Smithy; 54.08929°N 1.97850°W	—	Late 18th to early 19th century	A smithy, later a private house, it is in stone with quoins, and a stone slate roof with gable coping and restored kneelers. There is one storey and an attic, and two bays. The doorway has irregular quoined jambs, and the windows have been inserted.	II
Congregational Church; 54.07251°N 1.99614°W		1811	The church is in gritstone, partly rendered, with stone gutter brackets, and a stone slate roof with stone gable copings and kneelers. There are two storeys, and fronts of three bays. On the entrance front are incised angle pilasters, and two round-arches doorways each with an architrave, tie-stone jambs, a fanlight with radial glazing, a keystone and a hood mould. Between the doorways is a rectangular window, above which is a plaque under sun-ray moulding containing an inscription and the date. All the windows date from the 20th century.	II
Methodist Church, Sunday school, walls, steps, railings and gates 54.07453°N 1.99655°W		1811	The church and Sunday school are in gritstone with stone slate roofs. The church has two tall storeys, a gabled front and three bays. On the front are a doorway and flanking windows, three similar windows in the upper floor, all with round-arched heads and blind fanlights. There is a sill band, and the gable is coped, with shaped kneelers. The school to the left has one storey, a half-basement and two bays. The central doorway has a plain surround and a cornice, and is flanked by two-light mullioned sash windows. Both the church and school are approached by steps, and the forecourts are enclosed by walls with decorative railings containing gates.	II
Liverpool Warehouse; 54.07236°N 1.99735°W		Early 19th century	A warehouse and store, later three shops, in gritstone, with long and short quoins, stone gutters, and a stone slate roof with shaped kneelers and gable copings. There are three storeys, four bays, and a recessed bay to the left. The entrance has a plain surround and a shallow triangular pediment, to its left are two shopfronts, one in the recessed bay. The windows are sashes in plain surrounds.	II
Portal of Barratts Incline; 54.08943°N 1.97784°W		1828	The portal of a tunnel leading into a lead mine is in stone, and consists of an opening about 3 metres (9.8 ft) high and 3 metres (9.8 ft) wide, with voussoirs and a keystone. Above it is a band, and three massive parapet stones, the middle stone with a dated panel.	II
3 Main Street; 54.07163°N 1.99824°W		Early to mid 19th century	A house, later a shop, in grey gritstone, with quoins, stone gutter brackets, and a stone slate roof with gable copings and shaped kneelers. There are two storeys and three bays. In the centre is a doorway with a plain round-arched surround and a keystone. It is flanked by shop windows, and in the upper floor are sash windows. At the rear is a round-headed stair window.	II
Pump casing and troughs 54.07207°N 1.99768°W		Early to mid 19th century	The water pump was moved to its present site in 1973. It is in cast iron, and about 1.5 metres (4 ft 11 in) high. Its chamfered square casing tapers, it is surmounted by an acorn-type finial, and on the south side is a restored spout. The pump is flanked by rectangular gritstone troughs with rounded corners.	II
The Count House; 54.08869°N 1.97869°W		Mid 19th century	An office for the former lead mines, it is in gritstone, with one storey and one bay. The entrance on the north side has a round arch with voussoirs and a blocked fanlight. In the left return, facing the road, is a two-light window with a mullion.	II
Yarnbury Lodge; 54.08901°N 1.97939°W		Mid 19th century	The house is in gritstone with square quoins, stone gutter brackets, and a grey slate roof with a kneeler and gable coping on the left. The central doorway has a plain surround, and the windows are sashes.	II
