= Sheila Bownas =

British textile designer and botanical illustrator

- Bownas c. 1955
- Born: Sheila Catherine Bownas; 4 March 1925; Linton, West Riding of Yorkshire, England
- Died: 2007 (aged 81–82)
- Occupation: Textile designer: Botanical illustrator

Sheila Catherine Bownas (4 March 1925 – 2007) was a British textile designer and botanical illustrator. Born in Linton, West Riding of Yorkshire (now in North Yorkshire), Bownas attended Skipton Girls' High School and Skipton Art School before being awarded a Yorkshire Senior County Art Scholarship to attend the Slade School of Fine Art.

At the Slade Bownas won a first prize in 1948 as well as having three pictures included in the 1948 Royal Academy Summer Exhibition. The following year she spend in Florence, Italy studying history of art.

After graduating in 1950 Bownas started a career in textile design as a freelance worker. Efforts to secure a permanent post failed probably due to sexism in the design industry; a rejection letter from Crown Wallpaper ended with the statement "With reference to your desire to obtain a position in our studio, the Director feels that should an appointment be made at all, a male designer would be preferable, considering our future policy." Her freelance customers included designs for Liberty's and Marks & Spencer.

In 1962 Bownas was commissioned by the Natural History Museum, London to produce a series of botanical studies for an exhibition. From this she accepted an offer from the Botanical Society of Britain and Ireland to become one of the illustrators of the guidebook Sedges of the British Isles for which she produced over 1500 illustrations over six years.

By the 1960s Bownas had returned to live in Linton where she remained for the rest of her life. She continued to freelance until the mid-1980s and continued to paint and draw until her death in 2007.
