= Grassington =

Town and civil parish in North Yorkshire, England

Coordinates: 54°04′21″N 1°59′53″W

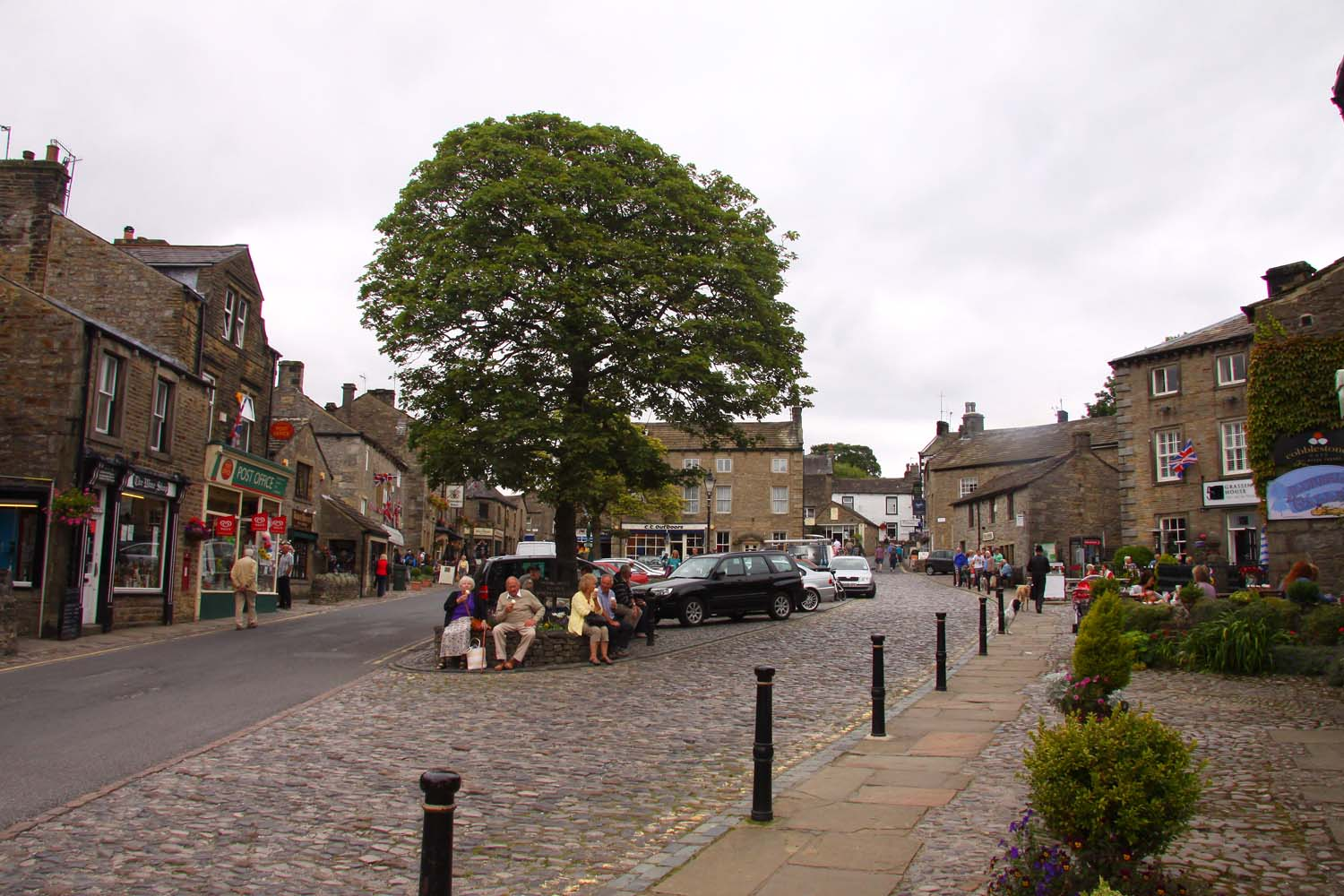
- The Square, Grassington

- Location within North Yorkshire
- Population: 1,126 (2011 census)
- OS grid reference: SE001639
  - London: 190 mi (310 km) SSE
- Civil parish: Grassington
- Unitary authority: North Yorkshire
- Ceremonial county: North Yorkshire
- Region: Yorkshire and the Humber
- Country: England
- Sovereign state: United Kingdom
- Post town: SKIPTON
- Postcode district: BD23
- Dialling code: 01756
- Police: North Yorkshire
- Fire: North Yorkshire
- Ambulance: Yorkshire
- UK Parliament: Skipton and Ripon

Grassington is a town and civil parish in North Yorkshire, England. The population of the parish at the 2011 Census was 1,126. It is situated in Wharfedale, about 8 miles (10 km) north-west from Bolton Abbey, and is surrounded by limestone scenery. Nearby villages include Linton, Threshfield, Hebden, Conistone and Kilnsey.

Until 1974 it was part of the West Riding of Yorkshire. From 1974 to 2023 it was part of the Craven District, it is now administered by the unitary North Yorkshire Council.

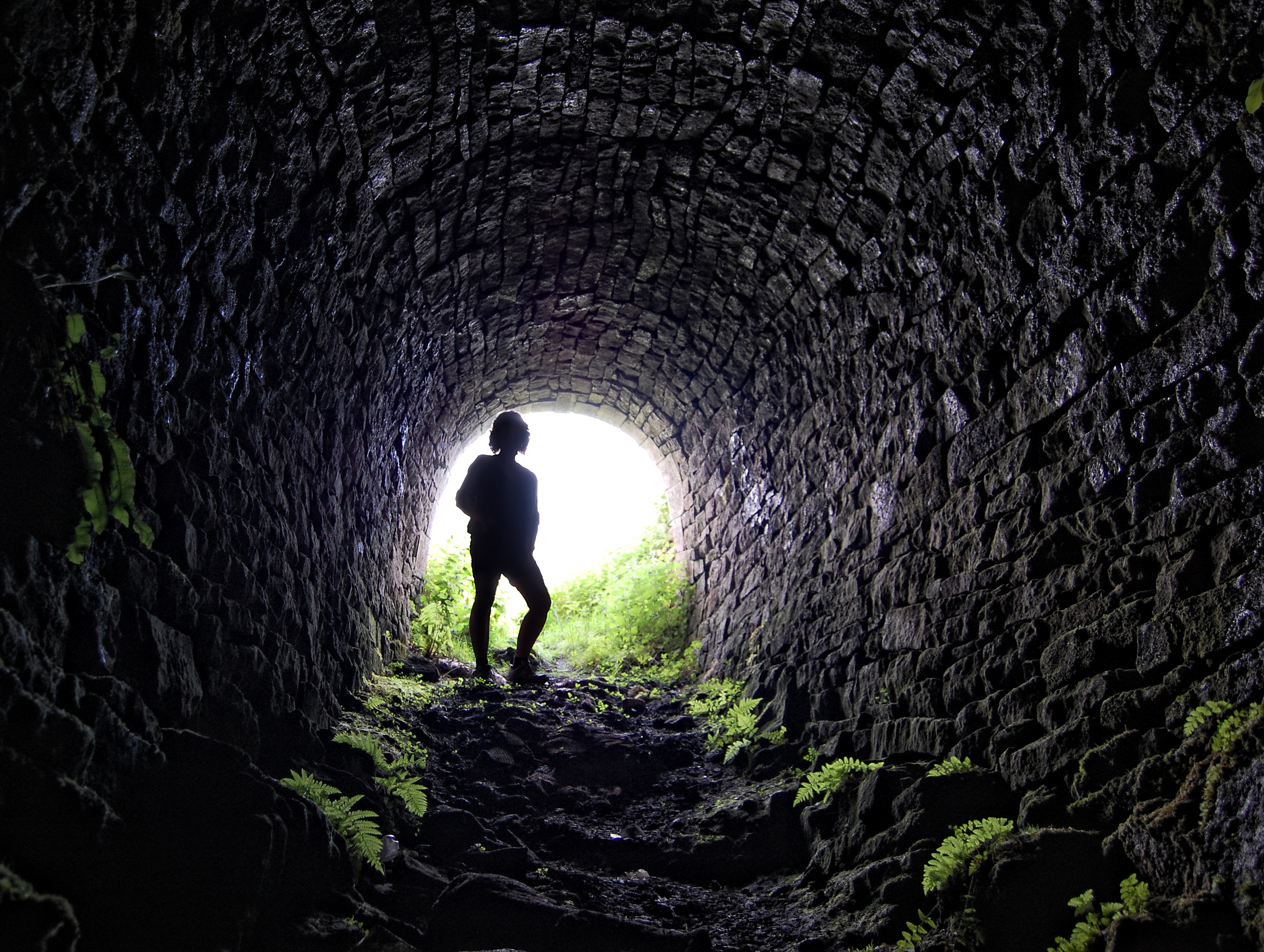
The entrance to an inclined shaft at Yarnbury Lead Mine to the north of Grassington

== History ==
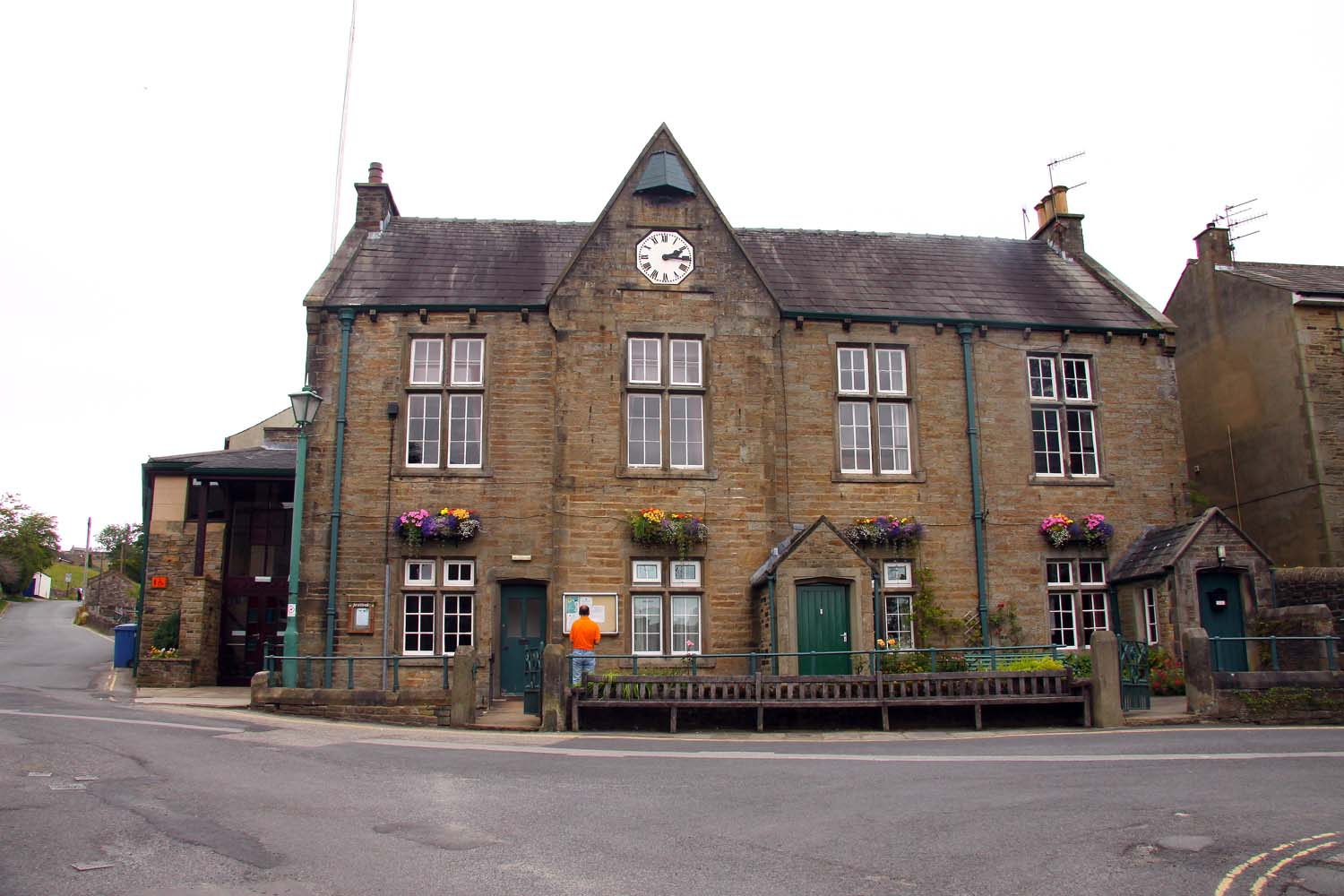
Grassington Town Hall

The Domesday Book lists Grassington as part of Gamal Barn's estate, including 7 carucates of ploughland (840 acres/350ha) including Grassington, Linton and Threshfield. The Norman conquest of England made it part of the lands of Gilbert Tison. But, by 1118, Tison had suffered a demotion and his lands returned to the king before being given to Lord Percy.

Originally spelled Gherinstone and later documented as Garsington or Gersington, Grassington's name derives from Scandinavian, Anglo-Saxon and Gothic origins, meaning 'town of the grassy ings' or 'farmstead surrounded by grass'.

Historically part of the parish of Linton in the West Riding of Yorkshire, Grassington became a separate civil parish in 1866, and was transferred to North Yorkshire in 1974.

Though sometimes referred to as a village, Grassington was granted a Royal Charter for a market and fair in 1282 giving it market town status. The market was held regularly until about 1860. Grassington Hall is reputedly the oldest house in Yorkshire, dating from the late 13th or early 14th century. A change in land use from the early 17th century, when lead mining began to assume more importance and brought some prosperity, but Grassington's heyday arrived during the late 18th and early 19th centuries. Grassington Town Hall was completed in 1855. The opening of the Yorkshire Dales Railway to Threshfield in 1902 brought new visitors, many of whom settled, some finding work in Skipton or in the developing limestone quarries.

Grassington & Threshfield Golf Club (now defunct) was founded in 1908 and continued until the Second World War.

Grassington was used as the setting for the fictional town of Darrowby in the 2020 Channel 5 series All Creatures Great and Small, instead of Thirsk where the actual story took place; Thirsk had become too large for the small-town feel that the series wanted.

Grassington worked well for filming. "The nice thing was that there weren’t any modern houses in the town center [sic] ... so we didn’t have to change anything completely. What we did change were all the shop signs and the usual things like aerials, satellite dishes, alarm boxes and all of those things".

A memorial of the trade unionist Tom Mann stands in front of the cottage where he died in Grassington.

== Culture and community ==
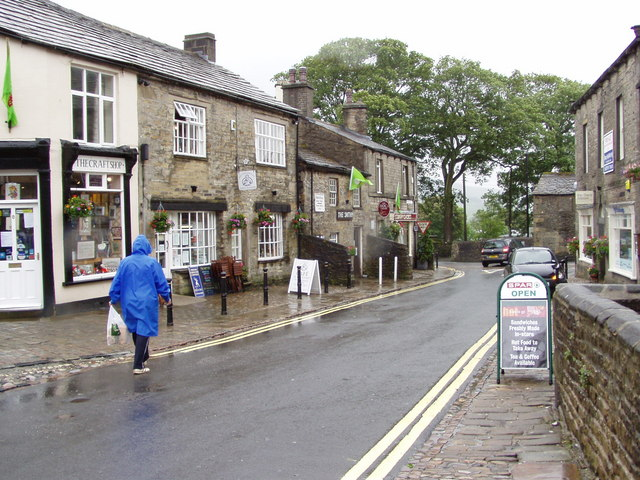
Grassington, looking down from The Square (2007)

Grassington is the main residential and tourist centre in Upper Wharfedale. It is centred on its small cobbled square, around which and along the adjoining Main Street are shops, public houses, the folk museum, cafes, restaurants and hotels. Grassington Folk Museum houses a collection which tells the story of Wharfedale. It is an independent museum run and managed by volunteers.

The area is popular with walkers; one of the most popular routes is a circular walk that includes Burnsall. Upper Wharfedale Fell Rescue Association, based in Grassington, is a voluntary mountain rescue organisation which rescues people in trouble on the surrounding fells and in caves.

Grassington Festival was a two-week-long annual event 1980 - 2021, with music, performance and visual arts, held in a number of venues around the town.

Every September since 2011, Grassington has held a 1940s themed weekend. Events include dances and a variety of military and civilian vehicles on display from the period.

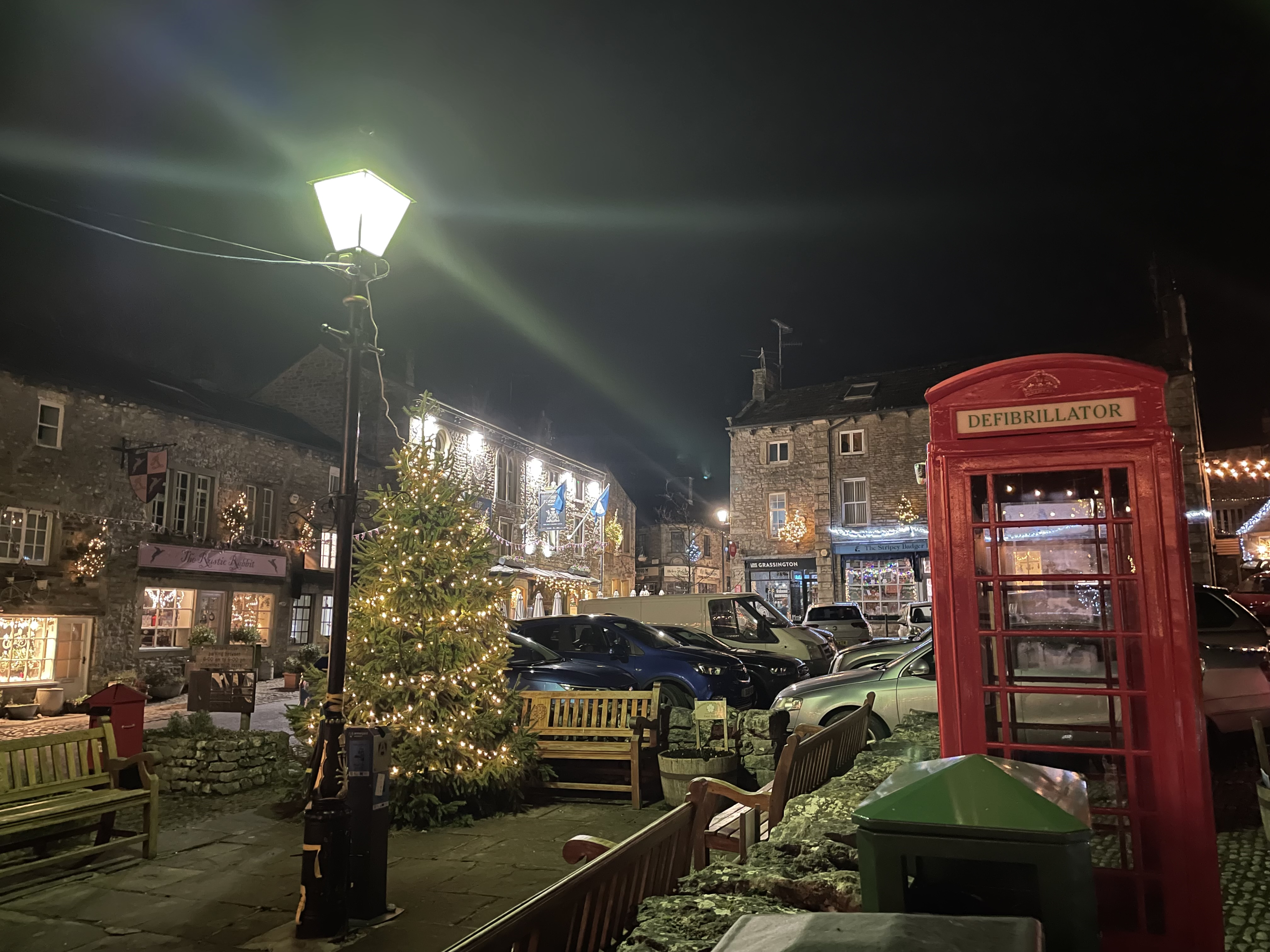
The Grassington square at Christmas

In the winter Grassington holds its Christmas Markets, for 40 years this used to be the popular Dickensian Christmas Markets.

There is a Yorkshire Dales National Park information centre, on Hebden Road.

Three miles north of Grassington, at Kilnsey, is the glacially carved overhang of Kilnsey Crag.

Grass Wood, an area of ancient woodland including the Iron-Age fort, Fort Gregory (also known as Gregory's Fort), is situated just over 3 miles (5 km) north-west of Grassington. The town was transformed into the fictional Darrowby for the filming of the 2020 television series of All Creatures Great and Small for Channel 5.

== Transport ==
=== Roads ===
Grassington is served by the B6265, which runs between Skipton and Green Hammerton via Pateley Bridge and Boroughbridge (being a more circuitous route that the A59 road which connects Skipton and Green Hammerton). Buses connect Grassington with Ilkley and Skipton operating a moderate service to Skipton, but only a three-day a week service to Ilkley.

=== Buses ===
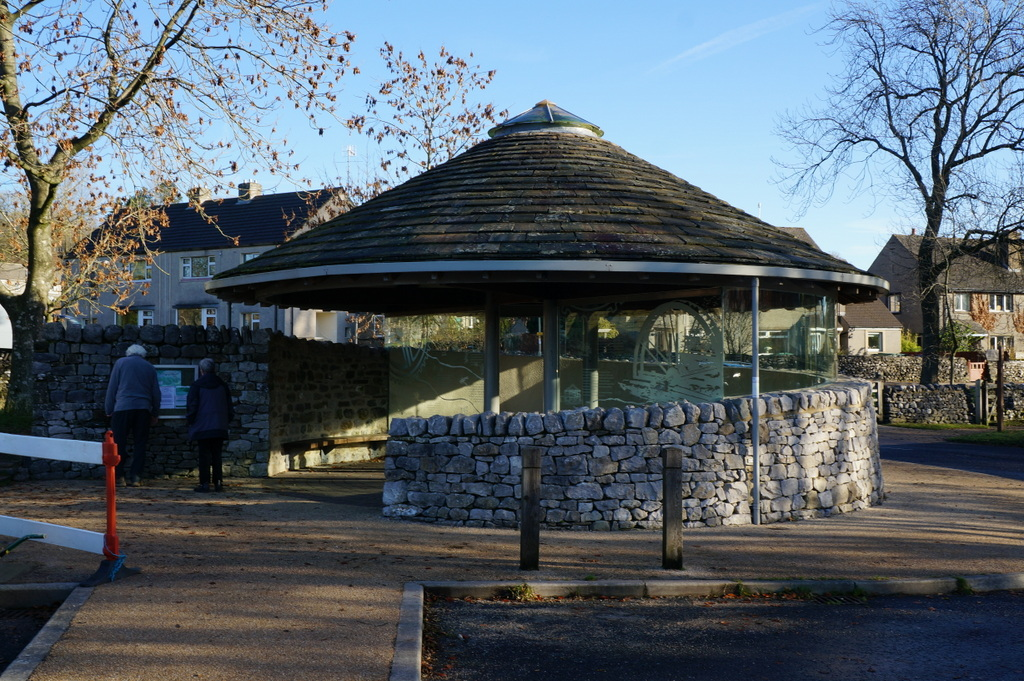
Bus shelter at Grassington

Buses are run by First Leeds, Coastliner, York Pullman, The Keighley Bus company and Yorkshire council.

=== Railway ===
Grassington used to have a railway station terminus, which was shared with Threshfield, on the Yorkshire Dales Railway. The station was located on the west side of the River Wharfe, so it was not actually in Grassington. The line opened in July 1902 but closed down in September 1930 after only 28 years of service. The station remained open to freight and railtour traffic until 1969 when the tracks were removed to a point 2 miles (3.2 km) to the south, at the limestone quarry at Swinden. Some of the quarry limestone continues to be transported by rail. The site of Grassington station is now a housing estate, but the Campaign for Better Transport have listed the Skipton to Grassington line as one which they wish to see re-opened to passenger traffic.

== Education ==
Grassington has a Church of England primary school located in the town, and there is another primary school in nearby Threshfield. Secondary education is either at the Upper Wharfedale School, which is a non-selective specialist sports college, or in Skipton at Ermysted's Grammar School (boys only) and Skipton Girls High School, both of which are selective.

== Electricity generation ==
In 1909 Grassington received its first electricity from a hydroelectric plant at Linton Falls, which continued to operate until 1948 when the National Grid arrived in the area. In March 2012 a new hydroelectric power plant was opened using the same but restored turbine house, which provides 500,000 kWh of electricity a year, using two Archimedean screws.

== See also ==
- Listed buildings in Grassington
