= Barden Moor =

Moorland in North Yorkshire, England

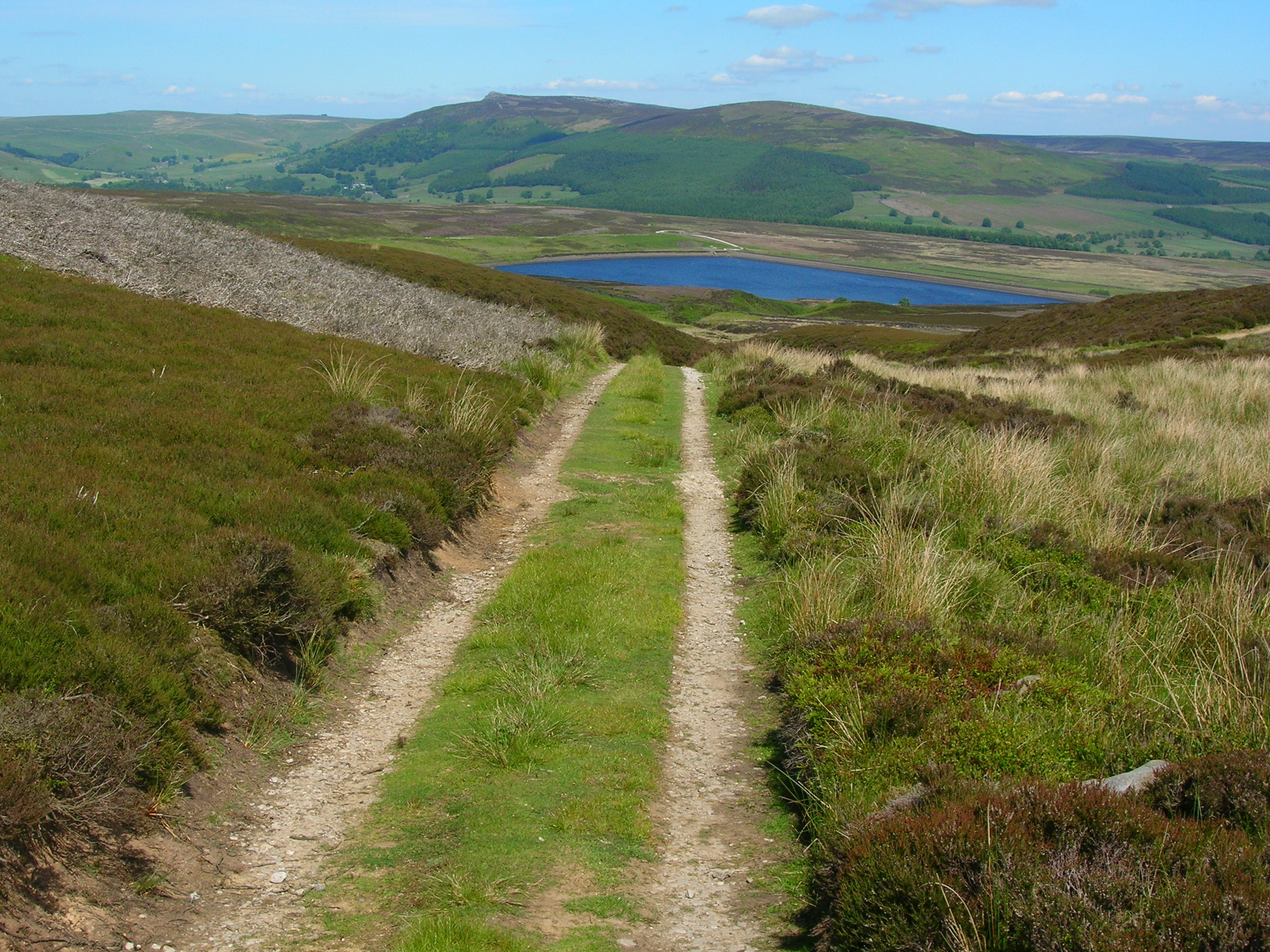
- Track on Barden Moor

Highest point
- Peak: Thorpe Fell
- Elevation: 506 m (1,660 ft)
- Coordinates: 54.011°N 1.963°W

Dimensions
- Area: 65 km^{2} (25 mi^{2})

Geography
- Location: Barden, North Yorkshire
- Country: England
- OS grid: SE0257

Climbing
- Access: Restricted occasionally

Barden Moor is an area of upland in North Yorkshire England, that is bounded by Skipton and Embsay in the south, Rylstone and Cracoe to the west, Burnsall to the north, and Barden to the east. Most of Barden Moor belongs to the Bolton Abbey Estate, and whilst there are paths across the moor, the land remains private and can also be closed to the public for up to 30 days a year. Barden Moor is an SSSI and is an important heath and blanket bog location, with it also being one of the largest natural carbon storage sites in England.

== History ==
Barden Moor covers an area of 65 square kilometres (25 mi^{2}) bounded by Embsay in the south, Rylstone in the west, Burnsall in the north, and the Bolton Abbey Estate in the east. Part of the moor is covered by the 30,000 acres (12,000 ha) Bolton Abbey Estate. Access to the moor was agreed between the Trustees of the Chatsworth Settlement and the Yorkshire Dales National Park Authority in 1968, after campaigns by protesters that saw over 1,000 people gathered on Ilkley Moor to protest about access rights on Barden Moor. As it is private land, access points and paths are limited, and the owners may close the moorland for up to 30 days per year, which is normally between August and December. These rights were granted before the Right to Roam Act of 2000, but they still remain in place.

The moorland is covered by several civil parishes; Barden, Bolton Abbey, Burnsall, Cracoe, Embsay with Eastby, Halton East, Rylstone and Thorpe, whilst the southern boundary of the Yorkshire Dales National Park follows the line of Barden Moor above Skipton, which is 3 kilometres (1.9 mi) away, and Embsay. Millstones were also carved out of the Millstone Grit which outcrops on the moorland; the Millstone Grit has been described as a "marked contrast" when most of the Yorkshire Dales is limestone country. The underlying limestone elsewhere saved the Dales from having reservoirs built, but as Barden Moor is on gritstone, it was ideal for reservoir building and in the small area that it encompasses, it had three reservoirs built, which are still in use. The first of the two on the moor, Lower Barden Reservoir, was authorised in 1854, but was not completed until 1860. Upper Barden Reservoir was completed in 1882. Embsay Reservoir was completed in 1910 and is also used for fishing and sailing. The dam heads are covered by grasses which stand out against the dark heather, and access roads are made from crushed limestone, which also stand out against the surroundings. Although all three reservoirs are owned and operated by Yorkshire Water, the two Barden reservoirs were built by Bradford Corporation Water Works, and Embsay Reservoir was built by Skipton Urban District Council.

During the Middle Ages, the moorland was used as a hunting ground, and this is reflected in the name Barden, which means the valley of the wild boar in Anglo-Saxon. Coal was mined on the moor during the 17th and 18th centuries, and there are some industrial remnants of that industry. One chimney stands on the moorland beside a crater which is said to be the collapsed shaft of the old mine. Coal was used in lead smelting at nearby Grassington and for domestic heating use.

Parts of the moorland are restricted during autumn due to grouse shooting on the moor, and dogs are not allowed off the designated pathways over the moor. Harold MacMillan married into the Devonshire family (local landholders) and was at one point in charge of review into the 1949 Act to grant access to the moors throughout Britain. According to Dr Judith Rossiter of Cambridge University, MacMillan considered the demands for access to the moors by non-landowners as "outrageous". Most of the moorland, save for Upper and Lower Barden Reservoirs, and a small pocket of land downstream of both reservoir dam-heads, is designated as an SSSI. The Cavendish family (the Dukes and Duchesses of Devonshire) inherited most of the moorland from the Earls of Cork and Burlington in the 18th-century, but during the 19th-century, a boundary dispute with another landowner led to the installation of many stone markers across the moor.

To the south-west of the moor is the site of Clifford's Tower (not to be confused with Clifford's Tower in York); this no longer exists but is recorded on a map of the Bolton Abbey Estate from 1854. Beyond this is a stream labelled Waterford Gill, this is labelled on modern mapping as Waterfall Gill. Thorpe Fell, above the village of Thorpe, was always designated as the highest point on the moor at 506 metres (1,660 ft). However, modern mapping shows the top of Cracoe Fell to be 508 metres (1,667 ft). On the western edge of the moor at Rylstone Edge is the Rylstone Cross, originally placed there in 1815 to celebrate the Treaty of Paris, it is visible when driving along the B6265 Skipton to Grassington Road, though the current cross is dated to 1995 after the first cross fell down. Further north than the Rylstone Cross is the Cracoe War Memorial, which is 7.16 metres (23 ft 6 in) high, 2.7 metres (9 ft) wide at the base which tapers to 0.91 metres (3 ft) at the top, and set at a height of 500 metres (1,600 ft). The gritstone obelisk was built in 1922 and had 13 names added to it to commemorate those from Cracoe who were killed in the First World War; after the Second World War, a further three names were added.

The number of people accessing Barden Moor and Barden Fell in the late 1990s was around 30,000 per year.

=== Flora and fauna ===
Common lizards (zootoca vivipara) have been observed on the moor during soil and peat surveys. The moorland supports a variety of birds; curlew, golden plover, merlin, golden plover, redshank, short-eared owl and snipe. A population of trientalis europaea (chickweed-wintergreen) is known to be extant on the moor. The moorland is an internationally important heath and blanket bog habitat, and is one of the largest natural carbon stores in England.
