= Elizabeth Garnett =

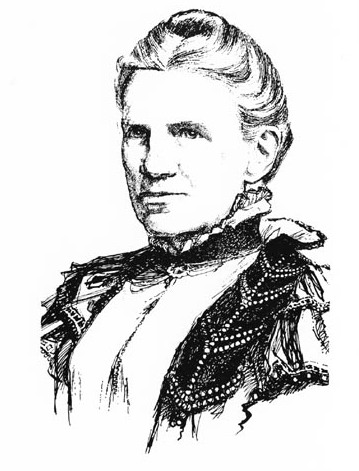
- Born: Elizabeth Hart; 23 September 1839; Otley
- Died: 22 March 1921 (aged 81); London Borough of Croydon
- Occupation: writer
- Known for: Navvy Mission Society

Elizabeth Garnett (23 September 1839 – 22 March 1921) was a British missionary to navvies and an author. She was a founder and leading force of the Navvy Mission Society.

== Life ==
Garnett was born in Otley in 1839. Her father conducted a service as Vicar of Otley for the men killed building the Bramhope Tunnel. The impressive monument is now listed and commemorated the work of the navvies who built the tunnel. Garnett married a clergyman but within a year she was a widow.

In about 1872 Garnett was moved by a camp of navvies who were encamped near her home who were involved in building Lindley Wood Reservoir. She opened a Sunday School at the site and within a year she resolved to move to the camp. She was joined in her work by the Reverend Lewis Moule Evans.

The Sunday School teachers and Evans founded a mission to the navvies by writing hundreds of letters to obtain support. The crowdsourcing created what was formally called the Christian Excavators' Union although Rev. Lewis Moule Evans took much of the credit for creating what became known as the "Navvies' Mission". The mission was founded in 1877 and Garnett was the force within it. That year she published Little Rainbow which was the first of the "navvy novels" which provided funds to the mission. Garnett is regarded as a co-founder even though she was not recognised as a leader of the mission. The mission grew and besides supplying missionaries the mission supplied libraries to enable education at other remote camps for navvies as well as soup kitchens and saving banks.

Evans had died in 1878 and Garrett became involved in further missions. The Church of England was supportive and when the Embsay Reservoir was built near Skipton the mission was based in a mill that provided a living space for 150 workers. The transformation in working conditions led to the mill being called a "mansion".

The Navvy Mission Society merged with the Christian Social Union in 1919 to form the Industrial Christian Fellowship, which continued to develop issues of social justice and business ethics.

Garnett died in Croydon in 1921. Five years later a memorial was erected to her in Ripon Cathedral.

== Works ==
- Little Rainbow: A story of Navvy Life, 1877
- Our Navvies, 1885
- Quarterly Letter to Navvies, from 1878
