= Embsay Manor House =

Historic building in Embsay, North Yorkshire, England

Coordinates: 53°58′50″N 1°59′36″W

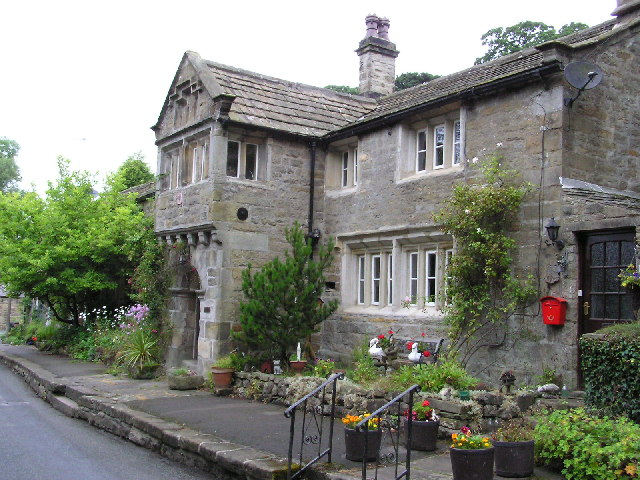
The building, in 2005

Embsay Manor House is a historic building in Embsay, a village in North Yorkshire, in England.

The house was constructed in 1636, for Thomas Alcock. It was known as "Dam Head" until the 1880s. From the mid 18th century, it was the home of the Biker family, and in the 1870s it was the location of a dressmaking business, run by Betty Biker. In the 20th century, the house was divided into two properties. The building was grade II* listed in 1954.

The house is built of stone, and has a stone slate roof with coping and shaped kneelers. It has two storeys and is six bays wide. In the fourth bay is a projecting two-storey gabled porch, the entrance with a chamfered surround, moulded impost blocks, and a basket arch with voussoirs. The inner entrance has a chamfered surround and a segmental-arched lintel, and there is embossed plaster decoration. The upper storey is jettied on corbels, and contains two datestones and an eight-light mullioned window, above which is a stepped three-light mullioned window in the gable, both with hood moulds. Most of the other windows are chamfered and mullioned. Inside, there is original 17th century plasterwork in the central ground floor room, and there are original plank doors upstairs.

== See also ==
- Grade II* listed buildings in North Yorkshire (district)
- Listed buildings in Embsay with Eastby
