= Industrial Christian Fellowship =

The Industrial Christian Fellowship (ICF) is a British Christian organization which aims to promote Christian faith and values in the workplace.

== History ==
Elizabeth Garnett, missionary to navvies, co-founded the Navvy Mission Society in 1877, along with the Rev. Lewis Moule Evans. This missionary effort was funded by Garnett's "navvy novels", beginning with Little Rainbow, published in 1877. The mission grew, supplying missionaries to the navvies, libraries for the navvies' camps, soup kitchens, and savings banks.

The Rev. Henry Scott Holland, at the inspiration of the Most Rev. Edward White Benson, gathered a group together, to found the Christian Social Union in 1889. This organization was dedicated to investigating the causes of, and alleviating the problems of, poverty and other forms of social injustice.

The two organizations, having common aims of social welfare and justice, merged in 1919, to form the Industrial Christian Fellowship. The new organization set its sights on bettering the world through "all forms of work" (Prebendary P. T. R. Kirk).
