= St Mary's Church, Embsay with Eastby =

Church in Embsay with Eastby, North Yorkshire, England

Coordinates: 53°58′59″N 1°59′02″W

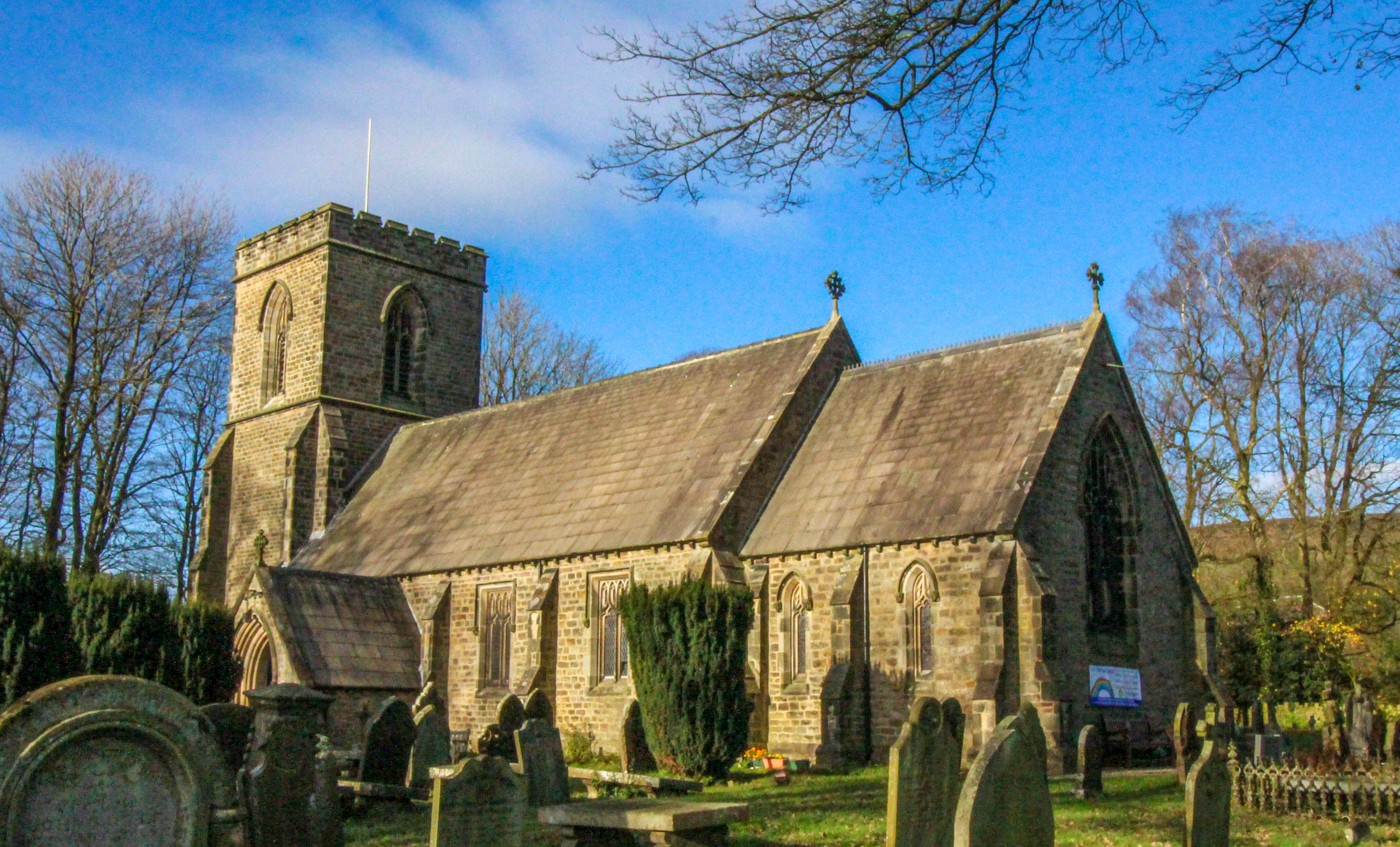
The church, in 2020

St Mary's Church is an Anglican church in Embsay with Eastby, a parish in North Yorkshire, in England.

Embsay Priory was founded in 1120. After the Dissolution of the Monasteries, a chapel was maintained for worship for many years, but eventually closed. In 1853, a new church was built on the site of the priory, to cater for a growing population, working in the textile industry. It was designed by G. T. Shaw. The church was grade II listed in 1987. In 2015, the church received a £92,000 grant to fund the restoration of its roof.

The church is built of sandstone with a slate roof, and consists of a nave, a north aisle, a south porch, a chancel, a north vestry and a west tower. The tower has two stages, angle buttresses, a two-light mullioned window with a hood mould, two-light bell openings with hood moulds, and an embattled parapet.

== See also ==
- Listed buildings in Embsay with Eastby
