= Upper Barden Reservoir =

Freshwater reservoir in North Yorkshire, England

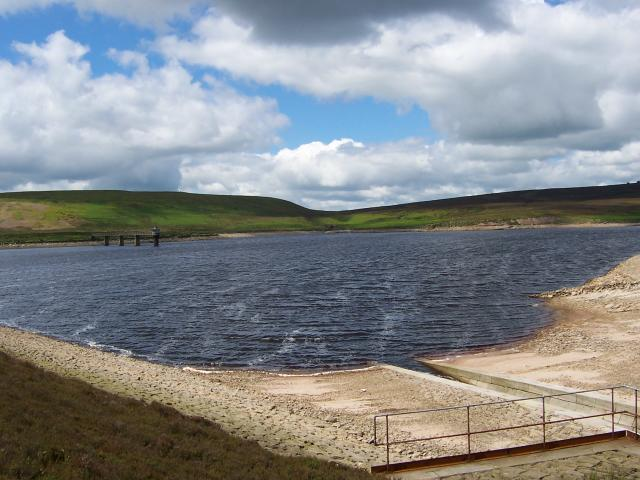
- Upper Barden Reservoir

- Location within North Yorkshire
- Location: Barden, North Yorkshire
- Coordinates: 54.017°N 1.981°W
- Type: Reservoir
- Primary outflows: Barden Beck (River Wharfe)
- Catchment area: 890 acres (361 ha)
- Basin countries: England
- Managing agency: Yorkshire Water
- Built: 1876–1882
- Construction engineer: Alexander Binnie
- First flooded: 27 September 1882
- Surface area: 54 acres (22 ha)
- Average depth: 31 feet (9.6 m)
- Max. depth: 60 feet (18 m) (Note: As designed)
- Water volume: 74,700,000 cubic feet (2,115,000 m^{3})
- Shore length^{1}: 1.2 miles (2 km)
- Surface elevation: 1,168 feet (356 m)
- Website: Yorkshire Water website
- ^{1} Shore length is not a well-defined measure.

Upper Barden Reservoir is an upland fresh water reservoir, one of two reservoirs that collect water from Barden Moor, and dam Barden Beck, a tributary of the River Wharfe in the Yorkshire Dales, North Yorkshire, England. The reservoir was opened in 1882 and also supplies fresh water to the Nidd Aqueduct, which transports it to Bradford. Upper Barden Reservoir was the second of the reservoirs to be built, (Lower Barden opened in 1860).

The embankment of the dam head is 125 feet (38 m) high, which at the time of its construction, was the highest in England, and notable for being one of the first to use concrete.

== History ==
Upper Barden Reservoir was constructed between 1876 and 1882. It is fed from streams running off Barden Moor, and its major outfall is Barden Beck, which feeds Lower Barden Reservoir and the River Wharfe. Separately, some of the outflow from Upper Barden runs into an aqueduct which in turns, feeds into the Nidd Aqueduct, supplying water to the Chellow Heights water treatment works (WTW) in Bradford. Between 1893 and 1901, when the aqueduct was being constructed, a pipe measuring 4,940 yards (4,520 m) was built to take water away from Barden Beck between the two reservoirs and feed water into the Nidd Aqueduct. All of these works were undertaken by Bradford Corporation Waterworks, to improve the water supply into the town (later city) of Bradford, which did not have a major water supply nearby.

When Lower Barden reservoir was opened in 1860, it was noted that the valley above would also be ideally suited for a second reservoir with the capability of holding the same volume of water as the lower reservoir (440,000,000 imperial gallons (2.0×10^{9} L; 530,000,000 US gal)). Much of the Yorkshire Dales lies on limestone, but the area of Barden Moor is underlain by millstone grit, which is not as porous as limestone, so is ideal for reservoirs. Upper Barden is an upland freshwater reservoir, being 1,168 feet (356 m) above sea level, and was built at the confluence of Hethersgill Beck and Padmore Syke.

The scheme received royal assent in 1875, however, the necessary surveying and preparatory work took some time, with the design and construction down to the newly appointed (1875) Bradford Corporation Waterworks engineer, Alexander Binnie. Work started on the reservoir in 1876, with an estimated cost of £200,000. It was intended to hold 500,000,000 imperial gallons (2.3×10^{9} L; 600,000,000 US gal) of water and, in the original plans, the lower reservoir was simply referred to as Barden Reservoir (or dam). (Note: Barden Reservoir, later Lower Barden Reservoir, was built between 1855 and 1860, but suffered failure in the dam wall and general construction. It was enlarged in 1874. The distance between the two reservoirs is just short of 2 miles (3.2 km).) When completed, the cost was £245,000 (1882) and the reservoir capacity was less than intended at 428,000,000 imperial gallons (1.95×10^{9} L; 514,000,000 US gal). The maximum water flow through the dam is 1,500 cubic feet (43 m^{3}) per second.

The dam's cut-off (the lowest part of the wall designed to prevent seepage) was constructed from concrete, one of the first to be made from this material in England. The cut-off trench was dug and completed by May 1879, and because of the "exceptional use of concrete.." (at that time), the event attracted much attention, especially in engineering circles. The embankment of the dam head reaches a height of 125 feet (38 m) and extends across the dam for 524 yards (479 m). At the time of its construction, the dam head embankment was the highest in England.

The trench which houses the embankment was dug to a depth of 30 feet (9.1 m) in places, so the span from trench bottom to crest of the dam head was 148 feet (45 m) at its highest. The dam embankment is filled with 810,000 cubic feet (23,000 m^{3}) of concrete, and 2,200,000 cubic feet (61,000 m^{3}) of puddle clay. Upper Barden was first flooded in September 1882, and it reached its peak in December of the same year. However, formal opening of the dam was not until 29 May 1883, when a deputation from Bradford Corporation travelled to the site.

The area was subject to flash flooding in June 1908, when 103 millimetres (4.1 in) of rain fell in 150 minutes. The dam walls, conduits and cut-offs, held up well, however the deluge destroyed many bridges and damaged roads in Airedale and Wharfedale.

The catchment area surrounding the reservoir is part of the West Nidderdale, Barden and Blubberhouses Moors SSSI. Like other reservoirs in the Yorkshire uplands, the water in Barden suffers from discolouration due to the peat run-off from the moors. The area around the two reservoirs is popular with walkers as the site is located in the Yorkshire Dales.

Upper Barden Reservoir is noted for its colony of black-headed gulls; one of the largest inland colonies in the north of England.

== Reservoir railway ==
As with other projects of this size, men and materials were transported to the site by a standard gauge 4 ft 8 1/2 in (1,435 mm) railway. Unusually, the railway had a transhipment point from a road; other major projects to create reservoirs in the Yorkshire Dales had railways connecting with heavy rail transhipment yards (Masham for Leighton and Roundhill, and the Nidd Valley Light Railway for those in Nidderdale).

The transhipment yard and navvy camp was located on the road between Embsay and Barden which is at 1,020 feet (310 m); this site is now a car park. The railway extended for 2.5 miles (4 km) along the edge of the hills to reach the dam head, and ascended by 200 feet (61 m) from the road at the navvy camp. On an average week, 400 tonnes (440 tons) of cement was shipped along the hillside to the dam head by the railway.

The railway was worked by three 0-6-0 saddle tank locomotives (named Bruce, Jingo and Wallace), made by the Hunslet Engine Company in Leeds. These were offered for sale in April 1883 at Skipton railway station, after the work at the reservoir site was completed.
