= Embsay Priory =

Medieval monastic house in North Yorkshire, England

Coordinates: 53°58′58.6″N 1°59′01.6″W

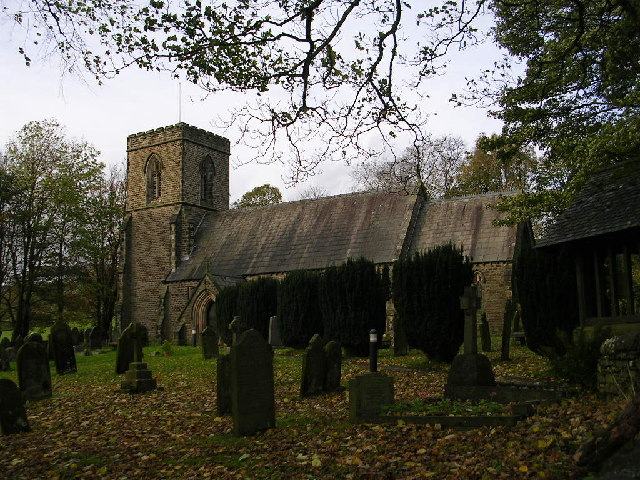
St Mary the Virgin's Church on the site of the former priory

Embsay Priory was a medieval monastic house in North Yorkshire, England.

The priory was founded in 1120 in Embsay at Wharfedale. It was dedicated to St Mary and St Cuthbert and was part of the Augustinian order. William de Meschines and his wife Cecily endowed the priory and the churches in Skipton and Carleton.

In 1154, the priory was moved to Bolton Abbey, which is 5 mi (8 km) east. However, a small group of canons remained until the Dissolution of the Monasteries. St Mary's Church, Embsay with Eastby stands on the site of the former priory.
