= Robert Sidgwick =

English cricketer

Robert Sidgwick (7 August 1851 – 1934) was an English amateur first-class cricketer, who played nine matches for Yorkshire County Cricket Club in 1882, and one game for Jamaica against R.S. Lewis' XI in 1894/95.

Born in Embsay, near Skipton, Yorkshire, England, Sidgwick was a right-handed batsman, who scored 72 runs at 4.80, with a best score of 17 against Kent. He also took seven catches in the field.

Sidgwick died in 1934 in Kingston, Jamaica.
