= Barden =

Barden may refer to:

== Places ==
- Barden, Craven, North Yorkshire, England
- Barden, Richmondshire, North Yorkshire, England

== People with the surname ==
- Amelia Barden (born 1993), Australian footballer
- Brian Barden (born 1981), American baseball player
- Christopher Barden, American lawyer, professor, and psychologist
- Daniel Barden (born 2001), Welsh footballer
- Dennis Barden (born 1936), mathematician
- Gary Barden (born 1955), British musician
- Jessica Barden (born 1992), English actress
- Laura Barden (born 1994), Australian field hockey player
- Leonard Barden (born 1929), English chess journalist
- Margaret H. Barden, New Hampshire state legislator
