= Listed buildings in Embsay with Eastby =

Embsay with Eastby is a civil parish in the county of North Yorkshire, England. It contains 24 listed buildings that are recorded in the National Heritage List for England. Of these, one is listed at Grade II*, the middle of the three grades, and the others are at Grade II, the lowest grade. The parish contains the villages of Embsay and Eastby and the surrounding countryside. Most of the listed buildings are houses, cottages, farmhouses and associated structures, and the others include a public house, a mounting block, a church, a former engine house, buildings associated with Embsay railway station, a war memorial, and two telephone kiosks.

== Key ==
Grade	Criteria
II*	Particularly important buildings of more than special interest
II	Buildings of national importance and special interest

== Buildings ==
Name and location	Photograph	Date	Notes	Grade
Manor House; 53.98052°N 1.99350°W		c. 1635	The house, later divided into two, is in stone, and has a stone slate roof with coping and shaped kneelers. There are two storeys and six bays. In the fourth bay is a projecting two-storey gabled porch, the entrance with a chamfered surround, moulded impost blocks, and a basket arch with voussoirs. The inner entrance has a chamfered surround and a segmental-arched lintel, and there is embossed plaster decoration. The upper storey is jettied on corbels, and contains two datestones and an eight-light mullioned window, above which is a stepped three-light mullioned window in the gable, both with hood moulds. Most of the other windows are chamfered and mullioned.	II*
12 Barden Road, Eastby; 53.98566°N 1.97508°W	—	Mid 17th century	Two cottages, later combined into one, in stone with a stone slate roof. There are two storeys, three bays, and a single-bay extension on the left. On the front are two doorways, the original one with a chamfered surround, a basket-arched lintel and a hood mould. The windows are double-chamfered and mullioned, some with hood moulds.	II
Dale Head Farmhouse; 53.98577°N 1.97068°W		Mid 17th century	The farmhouse is in stone on a plinth, and has a stone slate roof with a kneeler on the left. Its rear faces the street, there are two storeys, three bays, and a right lean-to containing the entrance. Most of the windows are chamfered mullioned casements.	II
Eastby Hall and garden entrance 53.98590°N 1.96923°W	—	Mid 17th century	The farmhouse is in stone with a stone slate roof, and its rear facing the street. There are two storeys, four bays, and a continuous rear outshut. Most of the windows are chamfered and mullioned, and in the left bay, between the floors, is a blind window with a moulded surround. The entrance to the garden has a moulded surround, and a basket-arched head with imitation voussoirs.	II
Green Bottom; 53.98116°N 1.98146°W	—	17th century	The farmhouse is in stone, with a stone slate roof and a shaped kneeler on the right. The front was remodelled in the 19th century, and it contains a re-set datestone. At the rear are two storeys and three bays. The doorway has a chamfered surround, most of the windows are double-chamfered and mullioned, and there is a stair window with a splayed surround.	II
22–24 Barden Road, Eastby; 53.98589°N 1.97374°W		Late 17th century	A cottage in stone with a stone slate roof, its rear facing the street. Most windows are double-chamfered and mullioned. In the left return is a blocked segmental-headed doorway.	II
14 Barden Road, Eastby; 53.98585°N 1.97478°W		Late 18th century	A house, which has been altered, its rear facing the road. It is in stone, and has a stone slate roof with coped gables and shaped kneelers. There are two storeys and two bays. In the centre is a gabled porch, and the windows are recessed and mullioned.	II
Elm Tree Inn; 53.98031°N 1.98786°W		Late 18th century	The public house is in stone with a stone slate roof, two storeys and three bays. The doorway has a plain surround, a rectangular fanlight, and a pedimented hood, and to the right is a blocked round-arched doorway. The windows are sashes; two have a single light, and the others are tripartite with mullions.	II
Mounting block 53.98025°N 1.98777°W		Late 18th century (probable)	The mounting block in front of the Elm Tree Inn is in gritstone. It is about 90 centimetres (35 in) high, and consists of three steps.	II
Embsay Kirk; 53.98505°N 1.98496°W	—	c. 1780	The house is in sandstone, and has an eaves cornice with shaped modillions, and a partly hipped stone slate roof. There are three storeys and five bays, the central bay canted, and a single-storey single-bay extension on the left. In the centre is a portico with engaged Doric columns, French windows, a round-headed fanlight, and an open pediment with guttae to the soffit. The windows are sashes with moulded surrounds and projecting sills, the window above the portico with an apron and a hood mould.	II
Wall to field 53.98537°N 1.97407°W	—	Late 18th or early 19th century	The wall encloses a quadrilateral field on three sides, and is in stone with millstone grit coping. It is about 4 metres (13 ft) high, and stepped down a slope. There is a plain entrance on the south side.	II
Ellergill House Barn; 53.97604°N 2.01092°W	—	Early 19th century	A combination barn in gritstone with quoins and a stone slate roof. There is a square plan, and three storeys built into a hillside. The openings include a cart doorway, smaller doorways, windows and slit vents.	II
Cabmen's Shelter, Embsay railway station 53.97548°N 1.99100°W		Early 19th century	The shelter is in timber, with overhanging eaves on consoles, and a felt roof with finials on the gables. In the centre is a doorway flanked by four two-light mullioned and transomed windows with ogee-headed tracery.	II
Green Field House; 53.98090°N 1.98135°W	—	Early 19th century	A farmhouse, later a private house, in stone with a stone slate roof. There are two storeys and four bays. On the front is a gabled porch, a French window and sash windows. The upper floor contains two small windows with chamfered surrounds, and three three-light chamfered mullioned windows.	II
The Garth; 53.97976°N 1.99156°W		c. 1840	The house is in stone, with sill bands, eaves modillions, and a slate roof with coped gables and kneelers. There are two storeys and four bays, the outer bays projecting and gabled. The central entrance has a plain surround and a moulded hood, and it contains French windows. In the ground floor of the left bay is a tripartite window, and the other windows are sashes.	II
St Mary's Church; 53.98295°N 1.98376°W		1852–53	The church is in sandstone with a slate roof, and consists of a nave, a north aisle, a south porch, a chancel, a north vestry and a west tower. The tower has two stages, angle buttresses, a two-light mullioned window with a hood mould, two-light bell openings with hood moulds, and an embattled parapet.	II
Old Engine House; 53.97482°N 1.99143°W		1856	The former engine house, later converted for residential use, is in stone, with quoins, eaves on paired blocks, and a slate roof. It contains two round-arched entrances with rusticated voussoirs and a wide round-arched window. At the east end is a small cottage, and on the west end is a low wing.	II
Brackenley House, wall and gatepiers 53.97613°N 1.99395°W		c. 1870	The house is in stone with a string course, a modillion eaves cornice, and a hipped slate roof. There are two storeys and three bays. The middle bay projects and contains a porch with Tuscan pilasters, a rectangular fanlight, and a modillion cornice. The windows have plain surrounds, those in the ground floor with aprons. At the rear of the right return is a three-storey block. The garden wall is in stone, and the gate piers are vermiculated and have moulded inscribed caps.	II
Weighbridge Office, Embsay railway station 53.97592°N 1.99027°W	—	Late 19th century	The former weighbridge office is in sandstone with projecting eaves and a hipped slate roof. There is a single storey and a single bay. On the front is a doorway, and the right return contains a tripartite window.	II
Passenger Building, Embsay railway station 53.97549°N 1.99123°W		1880s	The passenger building is in sandstone with a slate roof. There is a single storey, and a central range of three bays, flanked by gabled cross-wings. In the centre is a doorway flanked by fixed-light windows, and a canopy on two posts. In each cross-wing is an imitation Venetian window.	II
War Memorial; 53.98050°N 1.98604°W		1921	The war memorial is in a garden, and is in gritstone. It is in the form of a stylised Saxon cross, on a large square base, on three steps. On the north face is an inscription, and on the other faces are the names of those lost in the two World Wars.	II
Signal Box, Embsay railway station 53.97545°N 1.98950°W		c. 1923	The signal box is in timber, the lower storey weatherboarded, with a hipped slate roof. There are two storeys and an external wooden ladder to the upper floor. Facing the track are six windows, the middle two horizontally-sliding sashes, and the others with fixed lights. The upper floor balcony has simple iron balusters and a handrail.	II
Telephone kiosk, Eastby; 53.98582°N 1.97113°W		1935	The K6 type telephone kiosk in Barden Road, Eastby, was designed by Giles Gilbert Scott. Constructed in cast iron with a square plan and a dome, it has three unperforated crowns in the top panels.	II
Telephone kiosk, Embsay; 53.98029°N 1.98815°W		1935	The K6 type telephone kiosk in Pasture Road, Embsay, was designed by Giles Gilbert Scott. Constructed in cast iron with a square plan and a dome, it has three unperforated crowns in the top panels.	
