= Christian Social Union (UK) =

The Christian Social Union (CSU) was an organisation associated with the Church of England, with some similar features to the Social Gospel movement of North America. The group was established in 1889 and dedicated itself to the study of contemporary social conditions and the remedying of poverty and other forms of social injustice through public mobilisation to alleviate the same. The organisation was terminated by merger in 1919, becoming part of the Industrial Christian Fellowship (ICF).

== Establishment ==
The Archbishop of Canterbury Edward Benson helped set the stage for the Christian Social Union. In his Christ and His Times (1886), Benson had written that "there is much in 'socialism,' as we now understand it, which honestly searches for some beneficial remedy—much of which is purely religious and Christian." Furthermore, Benson said that all clergy should have "some knowledge" of socialism and that they should "prepare and suggest and promote the wisest social measures."

In the spirit of the archbishop's admonitions, in 1889, Henry Scott Holland, Regius Professor of Divinity at the University of Oxford called together a group, which evolved into the Christian Social Union.

From that meeting, the Christian Social Union (CSU) was established at Oxford, England, on 16 November 1889. Within a year, it had 77 members. A London branch of the organisation was established the next year. It had 124 members in 1891.

Its rules were that it would consist of "members of the Church of England" who agreed:

1. To claim for the Christian law the ultimate authority to rule social practice.
2. To study in common how to apply the moral truths and principles of Christianity to the social and economic problems of the present time.
3. To present Christ in practical life as the Living Master and King, the enemy of wrong and selfishness, the power of righteousness and love.

The group's origins lay in the writings of Frederick Denison Maurice (once a professor of theology at King's College London), Charles Kingsley, and John Malcolm Forbes Ludlow.

It avoided "hard and fast lines", allowing differing parties to work together in different ways in the same organisation. The Oxford and London branches of the CSU had very different orientations. The Oxford branch was concerned mostly with the accumulation and analysis of economic facts, with a view to helping to understand the nature and magnitude of contemporary social problems and developing potential solutions for such issues.

The London branch, on the other hand, was more oriented towards mobilisation efforts, organising public meetings and providing series of sermons and public lectures to Church of England congregations as well as a broader public.

While many of its aims were comparable to those of the social gospel movement in the USA and Canada, the CSU was less directly aligned with forms of theological liberalism, and included both liberal and Anglo-Catholic leaders. One of the organisation's early pamphlets declared:

We start from the conviction ... that the time is come to vote urgency for the social question. We believe that political problems are rapidly giving place to the industrial problem, which is proving itself more and more to be the question of the hour ...

We are of those who are convinced that the ultimate solution of this social question is bound to be discovered in the person and life of Christ.

== Development ==
From its origins in Oxford and London, the CSU spread throughout the United Kingdom, with about 60 branches established by the middle of the first decade of the 20th century. The organisation then claimed a membership of about 5000. Particularly active branches were established in Cambridge, Birmingham, Manchester, Leeds, Liverpool, and Leicester.

Two publications were associated with the group, The Economic Review, published at Oxford, and The Commonwealth, published in London.

The CSU became attached to the Oxford Movement through the work of slum priests.

Its leaders included Henry Scott Holland, Dean of St. Paul's, and, briefly William Temple, later Archbishop of Canterbury from 1942 to 1944.

== Termination and legacy ==
Its last annual report showed thirty-five branches and with a total membership "well over 4,000".

The Christian Social Union merged in 1919 with the Navvy Mission Society to form the Industrial Christian Fellowship, which continues to develop issues of social justice, business ethics, etc.

The British CSU was the inspiration for a similar organisation in the United States, also known as the Christian Social Union, as well as affiliated organisations in New Zealand and Australia.

== Bibliography ==
- Benson, Edward White (1889). Christ and His Times. London: Macmillan & Co.
- Bliss, William D. P.; Binder, Rudolph M., eds. (1908). "The (English) Christian Social Union". The New Encyclopedia of Social Reform. New York: Funk and Wagnalls Company. p. 205.
- Downer, A. C. (1898). "The Church and Navvies" (PDF). The Churchman. 13 (3): 136–143.
- Woodworth, Arthur V. (1903). Christian Socialism in England. London: Swan Sonnenschein & Company.
