= Embsay with Eastby =

Civil parish and electoral ward in North Yorkshire, England

Coordinates: 53.985°N 1.975°W

- Civil parish
- Population: 1,879 (2011 census)
- OS grid reference: SE016543
- Civil parish: Embsay with Eastby
- Unitary authority: North Yorkshire
- Ceremonial county: North Yorkshire
- Region: Yorkshire and the Humber
- Country: England
- Sovereign state: United Kingdom
- Post town: SKIPTON
- Postcode district: BD23
- Police: North Yorkshire
- Fire: North Yorkshire
- Ambulance: Yorkshire

Embsay with Eastby is a civil parish and electoral ward in the county of North Yorkshire, England. Its main settlements are the village of Embsay and the nearby hamlet of Eastby.

According to the 2001 UK census, Embsay with Eastby parish/ward had a population of 1,758, increasing to 1,871 at the 2011 Census.

Until 1974 it was part of the West Riding of Yorkshire. From 1974 to 2023 it was part of the Craven District, it is now administered by the unitary North Yorkshire Council.

Embsay Reservoir is within the parish.

== See also ==
- Listed buildings in Embsay with Eastby
