= Henry Scott Holland =

English Anglo-Catholic and social reformer

The Reverend Canon Henry Scott Holland
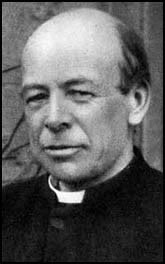
- Holland c. 1910
- Born: 27 January 1847; Near Ledbury, England
- Died: 17 March 1918 (aged 71); Oxford, England
- Known for: Founding the Christian Social Union

Ecclesiastical career
- Religion: Christianity (Anglican)
- Church: Church of England
- Ordained: 1872 (deacon); 1874 (priest)
- Offices held: Canon of Christ Church, Oxford

Academic background
- Education: Balliol College, Oxford
- Influences: T. H. Green; Arnold Toynbee

Academic work
- Discipline: Theology
- School or tradition: Christian socialism; liberal Anglo-Catholicism
- Institutions: Christ Church, Oxford
- Influenced: Tubby Clayton; Philip Napier Waggett

Henry Scott Holland (27 January 1847 – 17 March 1918) was Regius Professor of Divinity at the University of Oxford. He was also a canon of Christ Church, Oxford. The Scott Holland Memorial Lectures are held in his memory.

== Family and education ==
Holland was born on 27 January 1847 at Ledbury, Herefordshire, the son of George Henry Holland (1818–1891) of Dumbleton Hall, Evesham, and Charlotte Dorothy Gifford, the daughter of Lord Gifford. He was educated at Eton where he was a pupil of the influential Master William Johnson Cory, and at Balliol College, Oxford, where he took a first-class degree in greats. During his Oxford time he was greatly influenced by T. H. Green. He had the Oxford degrees of DD, MA, and honorary DLitt. He was ordained as a deacon in 1872 and as a priest in 1874.

== Religious and political activity ==
After graduation, he was elected as a Student (fellow) of Christ Church, Oxford. In 1884, he left Oxford for St Paul's Cathedral where he was appointed canon. In 1893 he declined the post of Bishop of Norwich.

He was keenly interested in social justice and formed PESEK (Politics, Economics, Socialism, Ethics and Christianity) which blamed capitalist exploitation for contemporary urban poverty. In 1889, he formed the Christian Social Union.

In 1910, he was appointed Regius Professor of Divinity at Oxford University, a post he held until his death on 17 March 1918. He is buried in the churchyard of All Saints Church, Cuddesdon, near Oxford. Because of his surname, Mary Gladstone referred to him affectionately as "Flying Dutchman" and "Fliegende Holländer".

While at St Paul's Cathedral Holland delivered a sermon in May 1910 following the death of King Edward VII, titled Death the King of Terrors, in which he explores the natural but seemingly contradictory responses to death: the fear of the unexplained and the belief in continuity. It is from his discussion of the latter that perhaps his best-known writing, Death is nothing at all, is drawn:

Death is nothing at all. It does not count. I have only slipped away into the next room. Nothing has happened. Everything remains exactly as it was. I am I, and you are you, and the old life that we lived so fondly together is untouched, unchanged. Whatever we were to each other, that we are still. Call me by the old familiar name. Speak of me in the easy way which you always used. Put no difference into your tone. Wear no forced air of solemnity or sorrow. Laugh as we always laughed at the little jokes that we enjoyed together. Play, smile, think of me, pray for me. Let my name be ever the household word that it always was. Let it be spoken without an effort, without the ghost of a shadow upon it. Life means all that it ever meant. It is the same as it ever was. There is absolute and unbroken continuity. What is this death but a negligible accident? Why should I be out of mind because I am out of sight? I am but waiting for you, for an interval, somewhere very near, just round the corner. All is well. Nothing is hurt; nothing is lost. One brief moment and all will be as it was before. How we shall laugh at the trouble of parting when we meet again!

The frequent use of this passage has provoked some criticism that it fails to accurately reflect either Holland's theology as a whole, or the focus of the sermon in particular. What has not provoked as much criticism is the affinity of Holland's passage to Augustine of Hippo's thoughts in his fourth-century letter 263 to Sapida, in which he writes that Sapida's brother and their love, although he has died, still are there, like gold that still is yours even if you save it in some locker.

Academic offices
Preceded by William Ince	Regius Professor of Divinity at the University of Oxford; 1911–1918	Succeeded by Arthur Headlam
