= Embsay Reservoir =

Reservoir in North Yorkshire, England

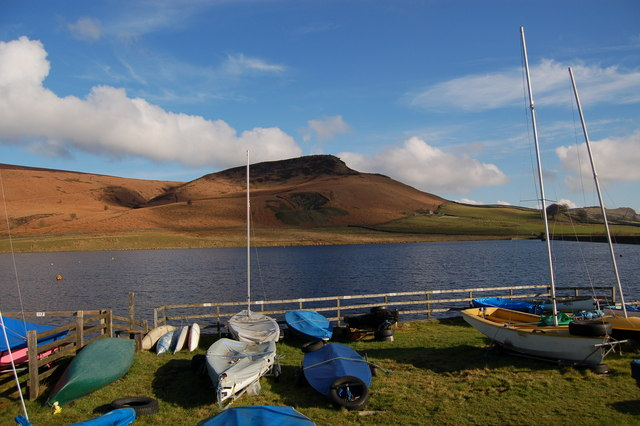
- Embsay Reservoir

- Location within North Yorkshire
- Location: Yorkshire Dales, England
- Coordinates: 53°59′14″N 02°0′12″W
- Type: Reservoir
- Primary inflows: Moor Beck, Lowburn Gill
- Primary outflows: Embsay Beck
- Basin countries: United Kingdom
- Surface area: 0.11 km^{2} (0.042 sq mi)
- Water volume: 795,000 m^{3} (175,000,000 imp gal)
- Surface elevation: 215 m (705 ft)

Embsay Reservoir is located above the village of Embsay, near Skipton in the Yorkshire Dales in North Yorkshire, England. It is owned by Yorkshire Water, and supplies water to the north and west of Skipton, feeding 25,000 homes. It has a dam height of 24 m (79 ft).

== History ==
The reservoir was built by Skipton Urban District Council to service the needs of a rapidly rising population in the area. Sanctioned by the Skipton Water and Improvement Act 1904 (4 Edw. 7. c. civ), forty acres of Embsay Pasture were compulsorily purchased from the Duke of Devonshire in 1905, and work started almost immediately, with the engineering contract being awarded to the specialist company, Messrs G H Hill and Sons. The construction contract at the amount of £47,164 went to Messrs. Harold Arnold and Son, of Doncaster.

During construction of the reservoir, engineers and 150 of the c. 200 navvy workers employed were accommodated in the Whitfield Syke cotton-mill on the north side of the reservoir. In the mill's warehouse, the Navvy Mission Society, concerned about the welfare of the workers, was allowed to establish a chapel and a reading room.

Construction of the embankment used locally excavated puddle clay, and stones were quarried from below the nearby Embsay Crag, the quarry still visible as a scar in the landscape today.

The reservoir was completed before the end of 1909, and the reservoir was full by 10 January the following year. It was officially opened on 21 June 1910. No houses were submerged as part of the project, but the old Whitfield Syke Mill was demolished. Today, the mill's warehouse, consecrated as a chapel, stands as England's last physical link to the Navvy Mission Society.

The reservoir is used for leisure activities such as sailing, angling, and walking, and is the home of the Craven Sailing Club. There are car parking facilities for visitors.
