= Margaret H. Barden =

State legislator

Margaret H. Barden was an American state legislator. A Democrat, she lived in Berlin, New Hampshire, and represented the 1st ward, Coos County, from 1925 to 1939 in the New Hampshire House of Representatives. She was elected to at least seven terms.

== See also ==
- Female state legislators in the United States
