= Embsay =

Village in North Yorkshire, England

Coordinates: 53°58′47″N 1°59′10″W

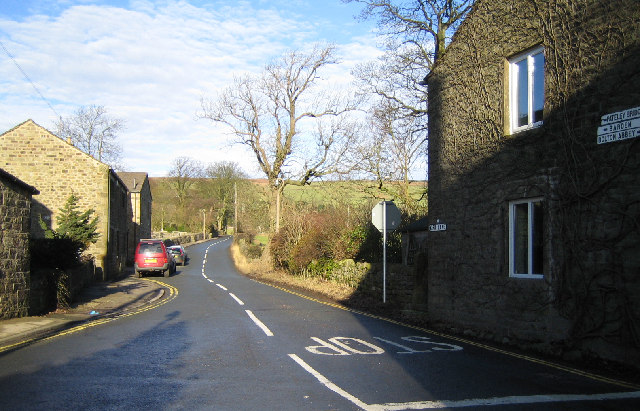
- Kirk Lane at Green Bottom

- Location within North Yorkshire
- Population: 1,758
- OS grid reference: SE011533
  - London: 185 mi (298 km) SSE
- Civil parish: Embsay with Eastby
- Unitary authority: North Yorkshire
- Ceremonial county: North Yorkshire
- Region: Yorkshire and the Humber
- Country: England
- Sovereign state: United Kingdom
- Post town: SKIPTON
- Postcode district: BD23
- Dialling code: 01756
- Police: North Yorkshire
- Fire: North Yorkshire
- Ambulance: Yorkshire

Embsay is a village in the county of North Yorkshire, England. It is paired with the neighbouring hamlet of Eastby to form the civil parish of Embsay with Eastby. The parish population as of the 2011 census was 1,871.

Until 1974 it was part of the West Riding of Yorkshire. From 1974 to 2023 it was part of the Craven District. It is now administered by the unitary North Yorkshire Council.

== Geography ==
At the foot of Embsay Crag, a rock formation north of the village, is Embsay Reservoir. The crag marks the start of Barden Moor, an expanse of open moorland that is open access land and used by walkers. There are two more reservoirs on the moor: Upper Barden Reservoir and Lower Barden Reservoir. Embsay Reservoir is the headquarters of Craven Sailing Club.

== History ==
Embsay was originally a Celtic settlement, possibly founded at the same time as a local monastery, destroyed in a Viking raid in 867 AD. The village has a Saxon name and is listed in Domesday Book as "Embesie", which translates as "Embe's enclosure". At that time, much of the area was wooded and this was progressively cleared over time to provide farmland. In 1120, Cecily de Romille and her husband founded Embsay Priory. The Augustinian members of the priory dedicated it to Saint Cuthbert and received local tithes. In 1154 they exchanged estates with the de Romille family and moved to Bolton Abbey, which was a more fertile location. The priory flourished and grew rich on the profits of sheep farming and wool trading. In 1305, Edward I granted a charter for an annual fair at Embsay. The Industrial Revolution resulted in several mills being built in Embsay.

== Community ==
Embsay Village Hall events include film nights, pantomimes, bowls, and jumble sales.

The village has a newsagent on the main road. The dedicated post office closed; a counter in a newspaper shop now serves as a post office. Other businesses in Embsay are a hairdresser and an arts and crafts store. Embsay has two public houses: the Elm Tree Inn and the Cavendish Arms. The Elm Tree Inn and Elm Tree Square take their names from a tree that stood there for many years. It was replaced in the late 20th century because of Dutch elm disease, but in 2006 that replacement was also taken down. A further replacement was planted in 2007.

The village has a Church of England voluntary controlled primary school which receives pupils from Embsay, Skipton and farther away. It was ranked the 141st best primary school in England in 2000, and had risen to 84th place by 2003.

Embsay railway station was built in 1888, and is the current terminus of the heritage Embsay and Bolton Abbey Steam Railway. There is a bus service between Embsay and Skipton eight times a day on weekdays and three on Saturdays.

The village has a cricket club that competes in the Craven League; its second team was, in 2006, the first second team in the league's history to play in the first division. The village also has a football club. Both clubs play at the same ground on Shires Lane at the north of the village. The club grounds are named the 'Robinson Memorial' after a local family who supported the club. Also at the north of the village is a recreational ground with a climbing frame and small football pitch.

== Filming location ==
In the 2018 BBC One television series The ABC Murders, Embsay is the location of the fifth murder. Scenes were filmed at the Embsay railway station.

== Notable people ==
- Ron Fawcett, rock climber, born in Embsay
- Robert Sidgwick, amateur first-class cricketer, born in Embsay

== See also ==
- Listed buildings in Embsay with Eastby

== Gallery ==
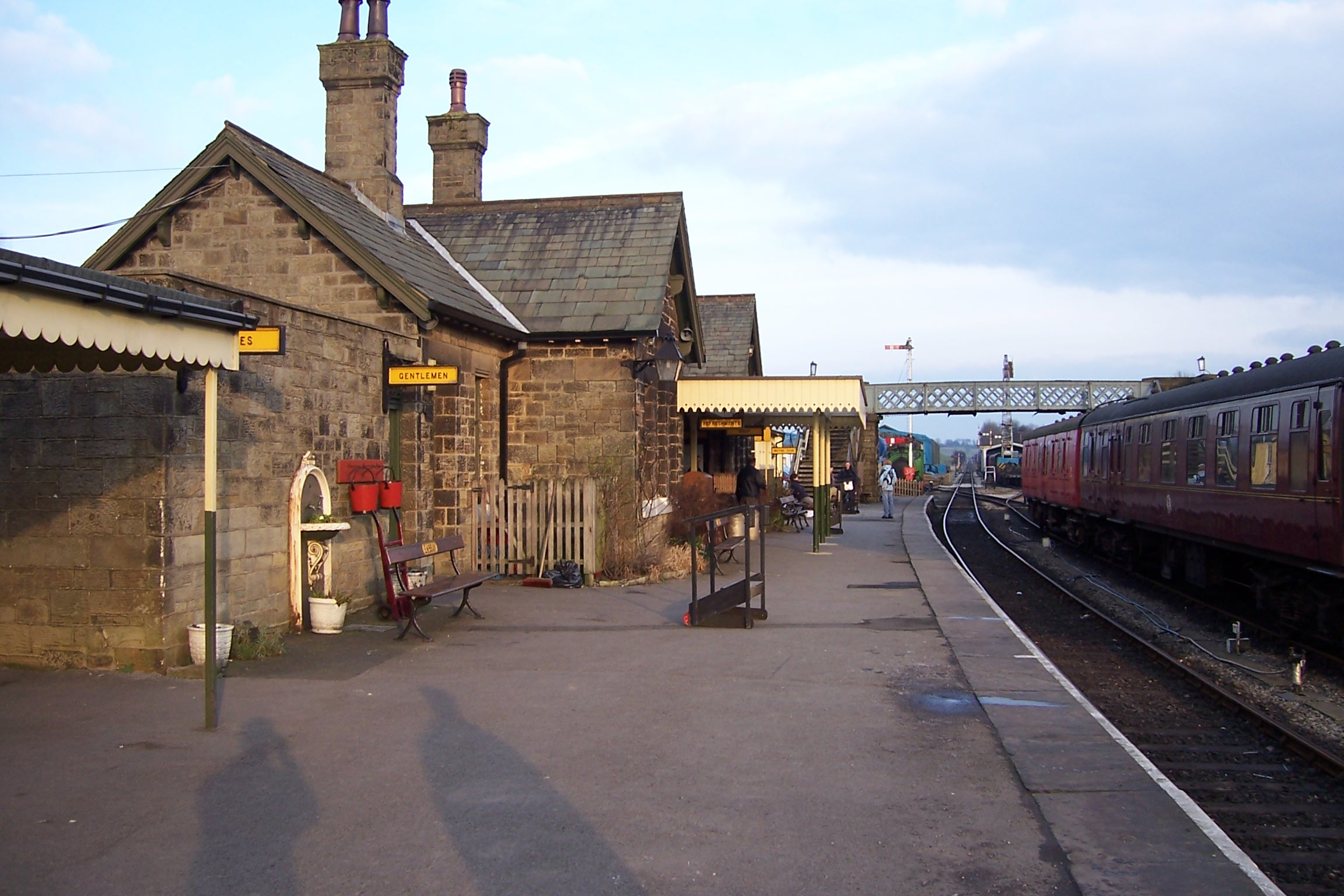
Embsay Station

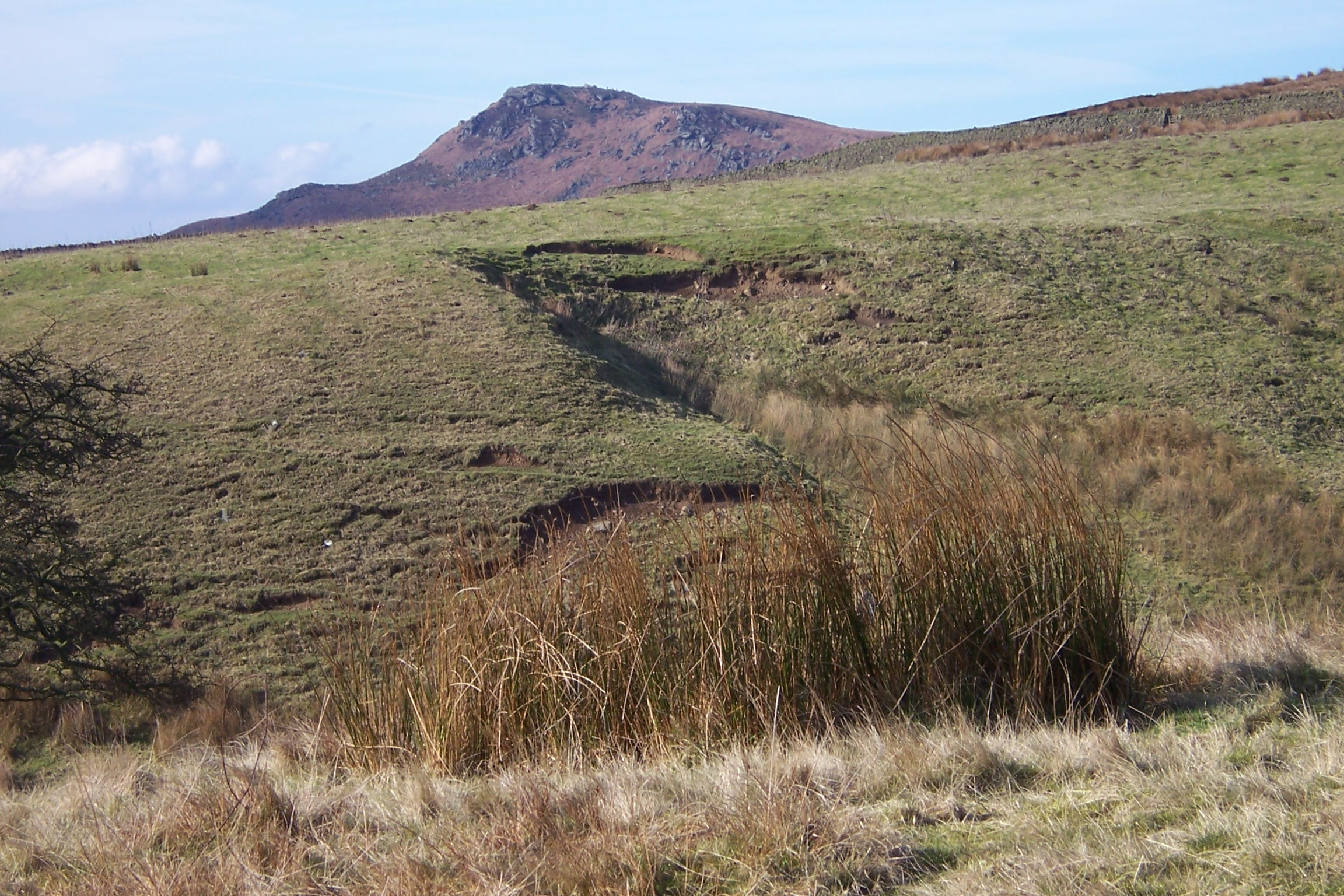
Barden Moor with Embsay Crag in the distance

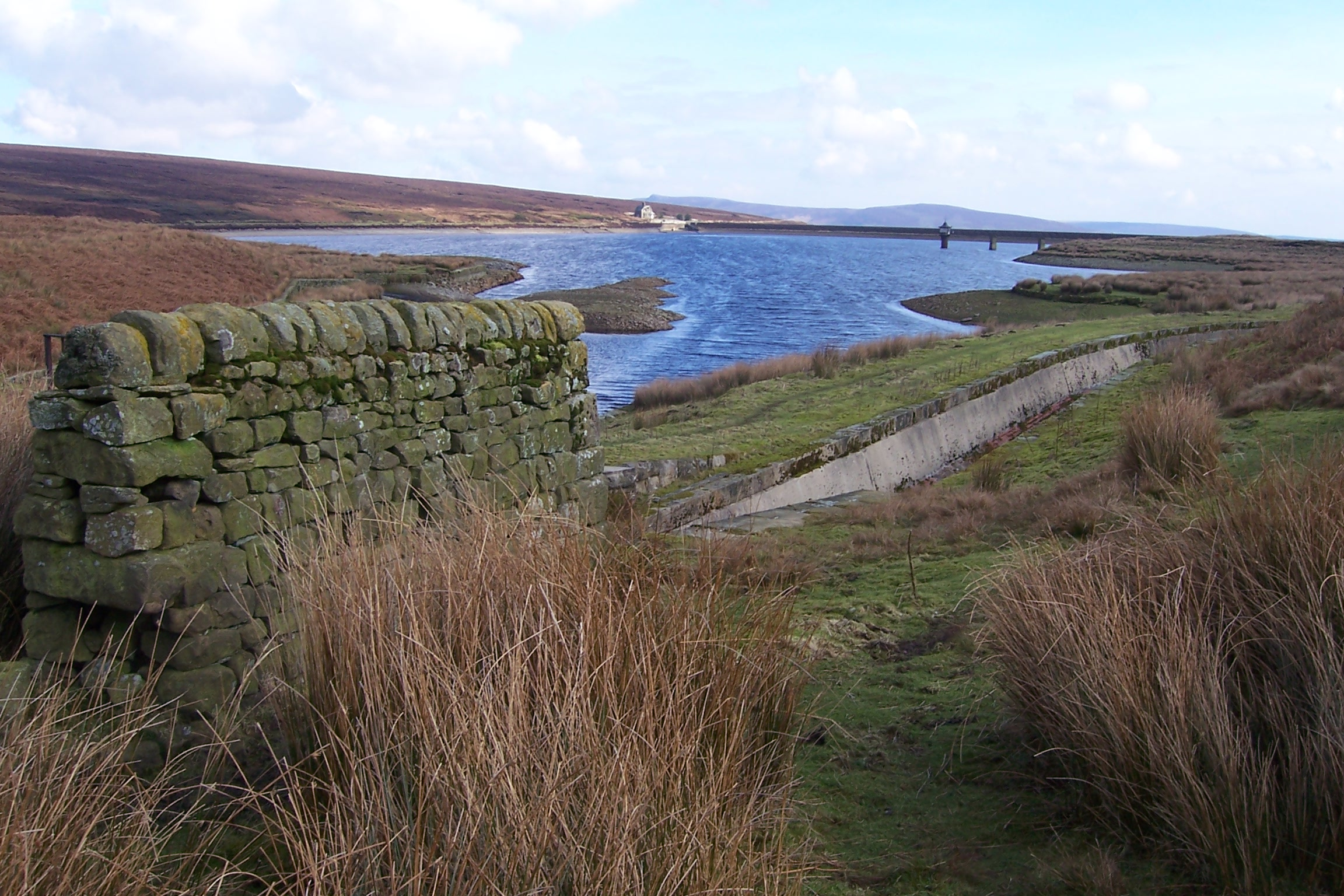
Upper Barden Reservoir in Barden Moor
