= Navvy =

Navigational engineers

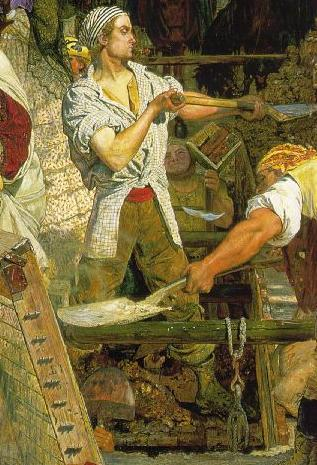
A "navvy" depicted in Ford Madox Brown's painting Work

Navvy, a clipping of navigator (UK) or navigational engineer (US), mainly refers to the manual labourers working on major civil engineering projects, though it is also used in North America to refer to mechanical shovels and earth moving machinery. The term was coined in the late 18th century in Great Britain when numerous canals were being built, which were also sometimes known as "navigations".

== Nationalities ==
A study of 19th-century British railway contracts by David Brooke, coinciding with census returns, showed that the great majority of navvies in Britain were English. He also stated that "only the ubiquitous Irish can be regarded as a truly international force in railway construction," but the Irish were only about 30% of the navvies.

By 1818, high wages in North America attracted many Irish workers to become a major part of the workforce on the construction of the Erie Canal in New York State and similar projects. Navvies also participated in building canals in Britain, and by the 20th century, they were the predominant workforce.

== Migration from canal to railway projects ==
The construction of canals in Britain was superseded by contracts to construct railway projects from 1830 onward, which developed into the railway manias. The same term of " navvy" was applied to the workmen employed on building rail tracks, their tunnels, cuttings and embankments. There were 250,000 navvies employed during the apex of British railway expansion efforts.

Navvies working on railway projects typically continued to work using hand tools, supplemented with explosives (particularly when tunnelling, and to clear obdurate difficulties). Steam-powered mechanical diggers or excavators (initially called 'steam navvies') were available in the 1840s, but were not considered cost effective until much later in the 19th century, especially in Britain and the rest of Europe where experienced labourers were easily obtained and comparatively cheap. Elsewhere, for example in the United States and Canada, where labour was more scarce and expensive, machines were more used. In the States the machine tradition became so strong that "[...] the word navvy is understood to mean not a man but a steam shovel."

== Navvy culture ==
Being a navvy labourer became a cultural experience unto its own during the 19th century. Most accounts chronicling the life of a navvy worker come from local newspapers portraying navvies as drunk and unruly men, but fail to provide any mention that families were formed and raised despite the navvy's travelling demands.

The navvies working on the Liverpool and Manchester Railway were paid daily and their pay reputedly went on ale, leaving little for food. When the workers were unfit to work, monies were subtracted from their wages and meal tokens were issued. These tokens could be handed in at meal caravans for a bowl of soup and a portion of bread. At first the token was a slip of paper called a "flimsy" because of its thickness. In today's terms it would be similar to a grade called "bank paper". As these tokens could be copied by forgers, the Liverpool and Manchester Railway supplied its contractors with six-sided food tokens that were surrendered for meals. These were cut from brass and had the initials LMR stamped upon them. This reduced the problems of drunken navvies and eliminated the local farm labourers freeloading from the food caravans. Tokens and a description of their use can be found in the Museum of Science & Industry in Manchester.

In the mid-1800s some efforts were made by evangelical Anglicans led by Elizabeth Garnett to administer to the perceived religious needs of navvy settlements, with preaching, a newsletter and charity work. The construction tycoon Sir Samuel Morton Peto encouraged religious services for his workforce, as well as providing some social services to the navvy populations.

=== Living conditions ===
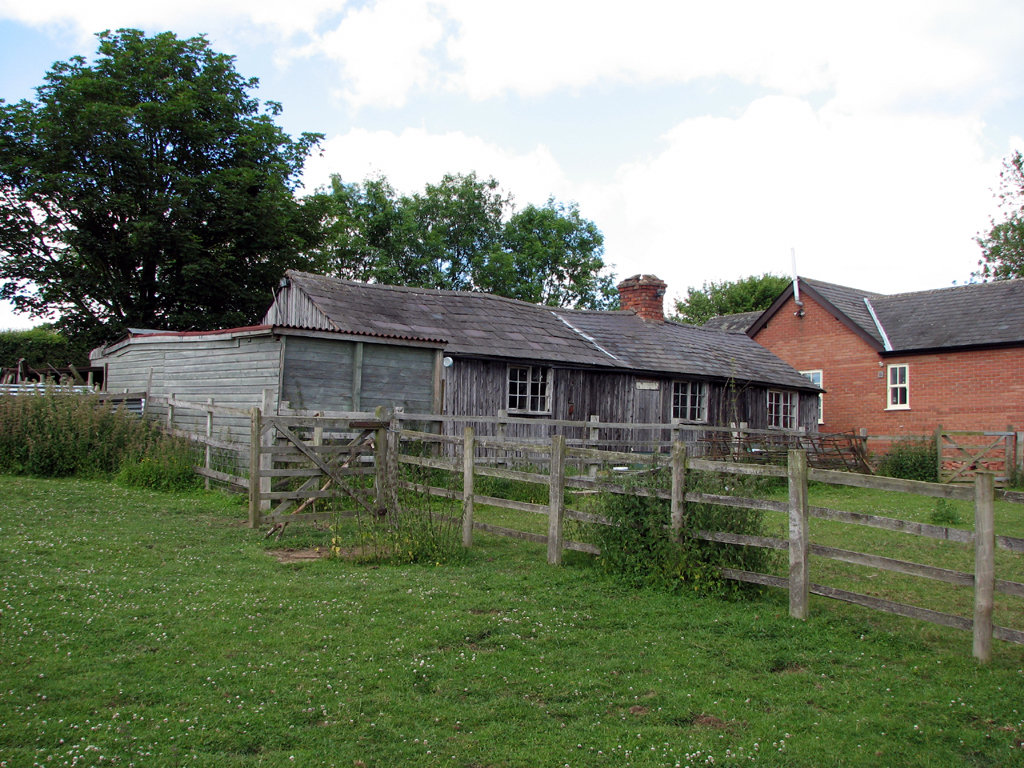
Wooden huts at the former Edmondthorpe and Wymondham railway station, the last surviving navvy housing in the UK and protected as a Grade II listed building.

Many of the navvies employed to build the railways in England during the early part of the 19th century lived in squalid temporary accommodations referred to as "shanty towns." Due in part to constructing through rural areas, and, in part, the navvies negative reputation, two-thirds of the railway construction sites had housing erected specifically for the navvy. Initially, the housing "huts" were constructed quickly and meant to be temporary. As a result, little thought was given to comfort, let alone sanitation, which was actually a prominent issue for everyone during the Victorian era. Shanties "were clearly unhealthy places in which to live, and it was not uncommon for a navvy community to be overtaken by cholera, dysentery or typhus."

In addition to these unhygienic living conditions, navvies shared housing, some even sleeping on floors. The majority of navvies were Englishmen, with 30% of the group being Irish. While this ratio varied from navvy shanty town to shanty town, sleeping arrangements were segregated. In at least one documented instance, a riot broke out between the two nationalities in one navvy shanty town, causing local magistrates to arrest 12 individuals. Though, this is not necessarily indicative of relations between the English and Irish in all navvy gangs.

Over time, housing arrangements progressed positively, with the structures being built with more care, and even attached land being offered for use so navvies and their families could grow their own food.

=== Working conditions for railway navvies ===
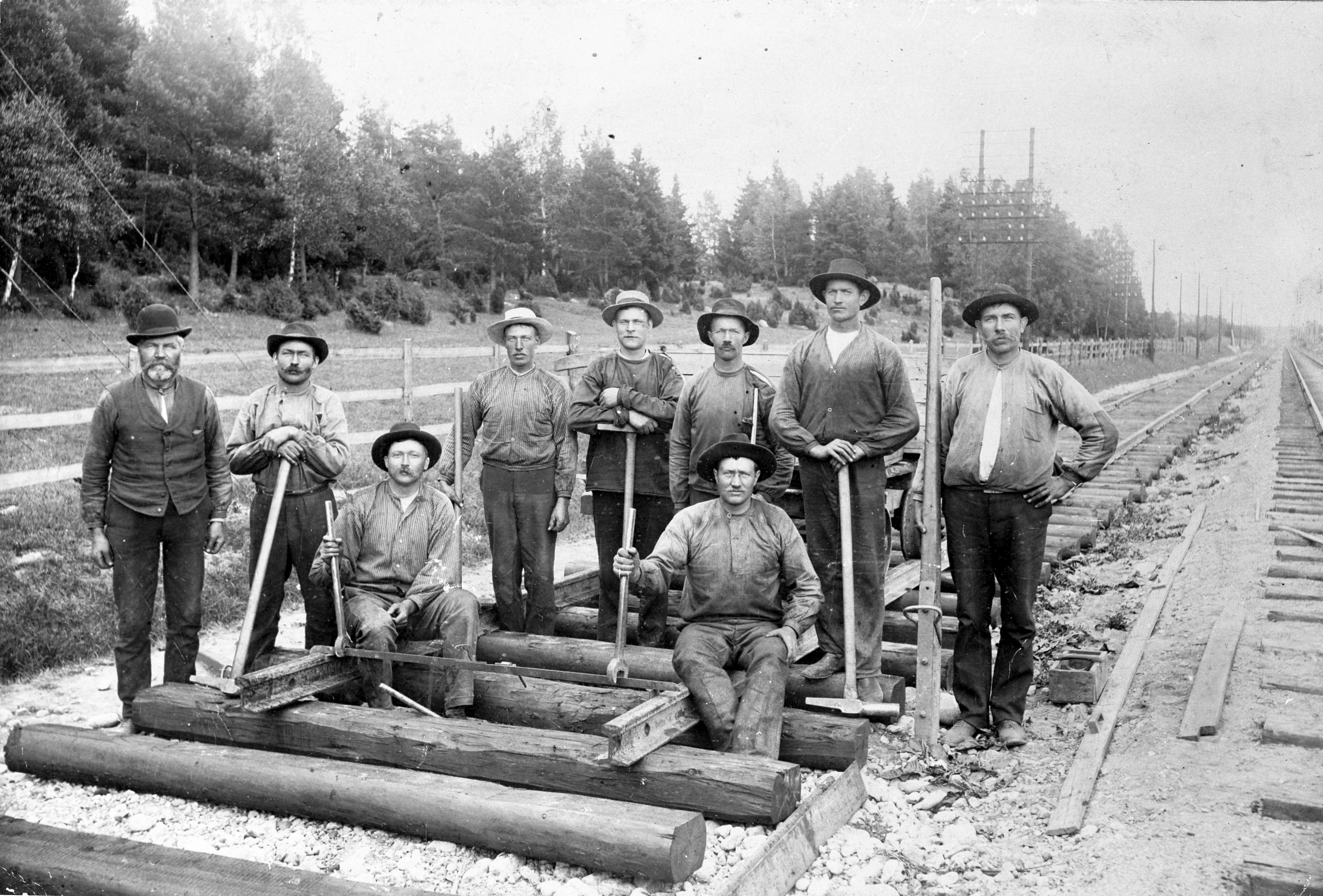
Navvies constructing the railway between Stockholm and Uppsala, Sweden (ca 1900).

In addition to their nomadic living arrangements, navvies confronted varying degrees of dangerous work environments that depended both on the terrain, and the locals' reception of them.

Due to limited safety protocols, navvies were frequently injured or killed on the job. For each mile of rail laid, there was an average of three work-related deaths, which was even higher when working on sections that required tunnelling. The particularly high incidence of navvy mortality during the construction of the Woodhead Tunnel prompted the Enquiry of 1846, which eventually led to the need for the formation of and evaluation by a Select Committee on Railway Labourers 1846.

The natural tension between locals and outsiders sometimes bred distrust of the navvies. Occasionally, this strain between the two would result in violence such as riots, or death. One such instance occurred at Sampford Peverell in 1811. John Chave, a local who was regionally well known for living in a "haunted house," was approached by a group of drunk navvies. The encounter left Chave feeling threatened, so after proceeding home with the navvy group in tow, he used a gun to shoot a warning shot into the crowd, which hit and killed one of the group members causing a riot to ensue. The death was later deemed a justifiable homicide. As newspapers reported on similar conflicts, anticipated tensions grew for the local inhabitants of the regions the navvy worked in, when they arrived.

In many cases, though, as time passed, the local establishments benefited from navvy business, which strengthened relations, and even forged friendships with an occasional local helping teach reading and writing to some navvies.

=== Navvy slang ===
Many slang terms were used as a method of communication among navvies, which facilitated bonding amongst them, as it was frequently used for a laugh, or as a method of asking for someone to watch one's back, while one sneaked a smoke break, or went off for a drink.

Much of the terminology appears to be fluid, relying primarily on rhyming with the intended meaning. One example provided by Daniel William Barrett, in his book, Life and Work Among The Navvies, contains the following navvy slang; "'now, Jack, I'm goin' to get a tiddley wink of pig's ear; keep your mince pies on the Billy Gorman.'" This means the speaker's going for a drink of beer, and asking the person being addressed, to keep his eyes on the foreman. Their exclusionary code usually left outsiders confused.

== Contemporary use of the term "navvy" ==
- An excavating machine or steam shovel, as noted above.
- In Britain, "navvy" sometimes means a workman digging a hole in a public road to get access to buried services such as gas mains or water mains.
- In Britain, the name "navvies" is sometimes given to members of the Inland Waterways Protection Society and other canal restoration societies.
- In Australia, the term "navvy" is still applied to railway workers. Some areas of the country, particularly towns and cities along the sugarcane belt of the state of Queensland, still employ teams of navvies on a permanent basis to lay and maintain the state's narrow-gauge cane-train tracks. Whereas Council workers who work on general civic projects advise of their worksites with fluorescent orange "Workers Ahead" signage, navvies use pale blue "Navvies at Work" signs.
- In British Columbia, "navvy jack" is a common term in construction and landscaping trades and in their respective supply stores for 1/2-and-3/4-inch (13 and 19 mm) crushed rock and sand to be mixed with Portland cement to make concrete. The usage derives from "Navvy Jack", by ordinary name Jack Thomas, a former navvy who used a rowboat to mine good-quality gravel from beaches in West Vancouver and infrequently ran a rowboat-ferry for settlers on Burrard Inlet and English Bay.
- A new public space in Archway, London, an area that was historically home to the city's navvies, was named "Navigator Square" in 2017.

== In popular culture ==
- Julian Barnes's 1995 short story "Junction" (published in The New Yorker, 19 Sep 1994) concerns English navvies building the Paris–Le Havre railway (see the collection Cross Channel).
- John Henry, an American folk hero.
- Alfred Doolittle in George Bernard Shaw's play Pygmalion is referred to as a navvy.
- Navvies are referenced throughout George Orwell's fictionalized memoir Down and Out in Paris and London.
- Gordon Lightfoot used the term navvies in his "Canadian Railroad Trilogy."
- Andy Partridge's song "Towers of London" on XTC's album Black Sea is inspired by the contribution of navvies to Victorian era London.
- The first song on Pere Ubu's second album, Dub Housing, is called "Navvy."
- The Pogues song "Navigator" is based on the life of a navvy.
- Dominic Behan's song "McAlpine's Fusiliers" describes the navvy life.
- The Genesis song "Driving the Last Spike" describes the life of the navvies.
- In the Doctor Who episode "The Unquiet Dead", the Doctor introduces himself to Charles Dickens, prompting Dickens to reply "Doctor? You look more like a navvy." In "Destiny of the Daleks", after Romana answers several questions about the chemistry of concrete, the Doctor says she "would make a first class navvy".
- In the Gaelic Storm song "Don't Go for 'The One'", Tracey McCall is described as having "arms like a navvy and a face like dried fruit".
- In Brendan Behan's autobiographical Borstal Boy, he joins a prison navvy gang.
- The Bitmap Brothers' steampunk styled video game, The Chaos Engine (1993), includes a playable character called "The Navvie", who is said to have single-handedly constructed the Banshee Boardwalk.
- The British TV show Time Team, in the episode titled "Blood, Sweat and Beers", covered the living conditions of a railway navvies' construction site that was in use for five years on the Settle-Carlisle Line
- British (Acorn) TV Jericho, Story revolves around a navvy town in 1870 Yorkshire, where a railroad viaduct is being constructed.
- The Ian Campbell Folk Group song "Here Come the Navvies" which was a song frequently taught in UK schools in the 1970s.
- One episode of the TV series Star Trek: Picard features a hologrammatic spaceship crew member (played by series star Santiago Cabrera), specializing in navigation. The hologram speaks with an Irish accent.
- The 2001 drama by Ken Loach called The Navigators about the privatisation of railway maintenance work in Britain.

== See also ==
- Bob the [South Australian] Railway Dog
- Coolie
- Gandy dancer
- Laborer
- Platelayer
