= Otley bus station =

Bus station in West Yorkshire, England

Coordinates: 53°54′19″N 1°41′32″W

Otley
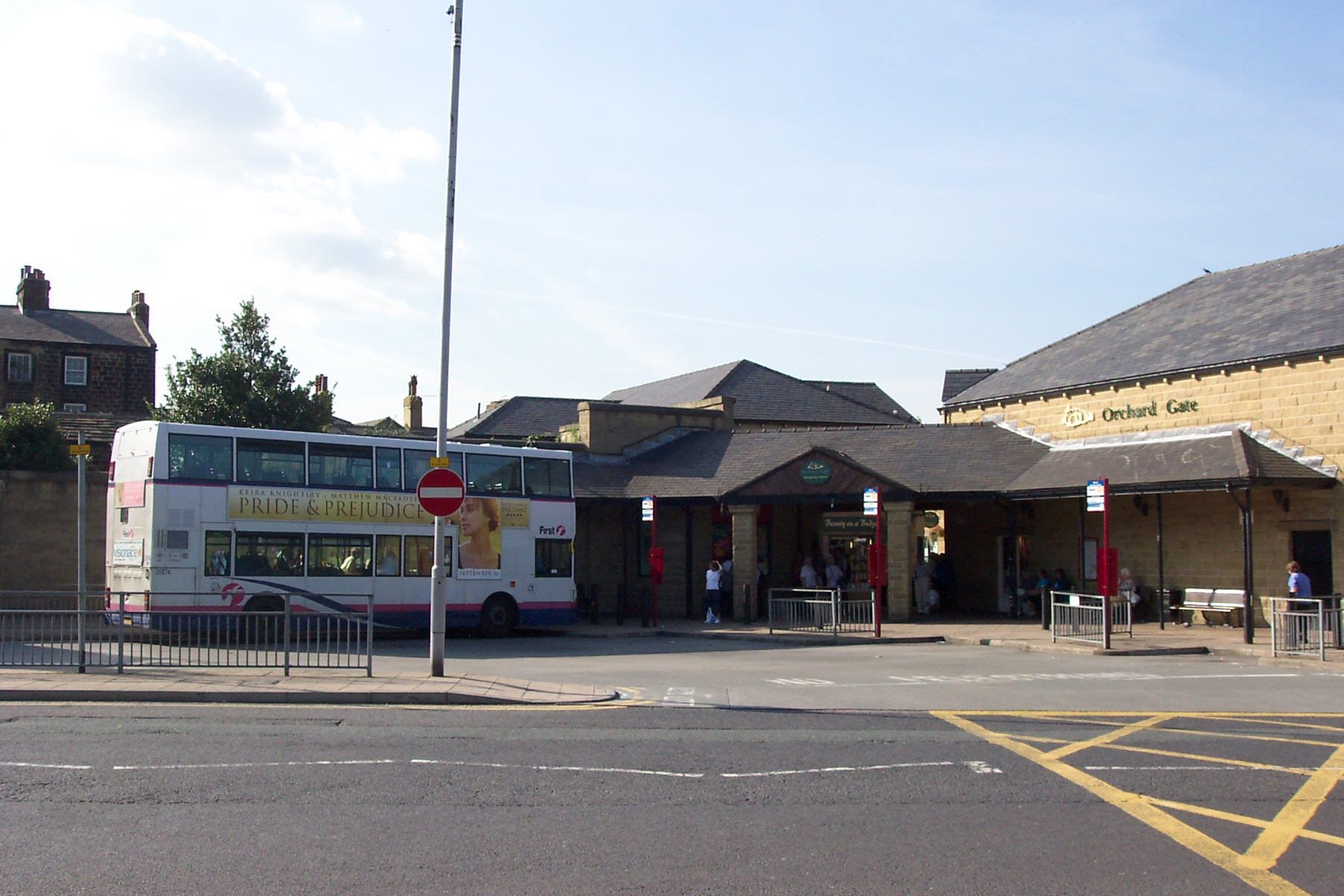

General information
- Location: Crossgate, Otley; City of Leeds
- Operator: Miller Group
- Bus stands: 5
- Bus operators: Connexionsbuses; First Leeds; Flyer (Yorkshire Coastliner); The Keighley Bus Company; Reliance Motor Services; TLC Travel; York Pulman
- Connections: Menston railway station (2 miles [3.2 km])
Location

Otley bus station serves the town of Otley, West Yorkshire, England.

The bus station consists of five stands in total. Stands 1 to 4 are in the bus station, whereas stand 5 is on Crossgate just next to the Bus Station. Unlike most of the bus stations in West Yorkshire, Otley Bus Station is privately owned by the Miller Group who own the Orchard Gate centre. As Otley currently does not have a railway station there is a regular connection from the town to Menston railway station 2 miles (3 km) away. This links the town with the Wharfedale Line to Leeds and Bradford.

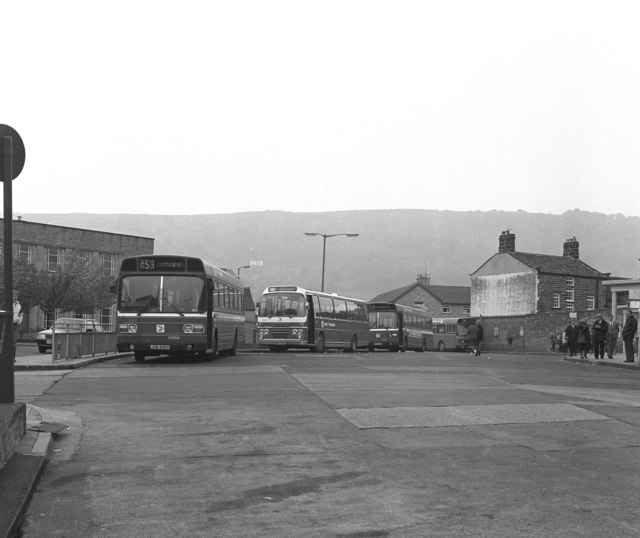
Otley bus station in May 1983

== Services ==
The following services serve Otley Bus Station:

Route	Destination(s)	Operator	Stand	Notes
33/34	Leeds (City Bus Station) via Menston, Guiseley, Yeadon, Horsforth and Kirkstall [Kirkstall Line]	First Leeds (Leeds City)	2	33 only serves Otley evenings & Sundays only
74	Ilkley, Bolton Abbey & Grassington	Yorkshire Coastliner	1	Dales BusSaturdays only - one return journey, other journeys run Ilkley to Grassington only
74	York	Yorkshire Coastliner	1	Dales BusSaturdays only - one return journey, other journeys run Ilkley to Grassington only
653	Bradford via Menston, Guiseley & Shipley	TLC Travel	4	One return journey Monday to Friday only
653	Pool (Bridge Corner)	TLC Travel	5	One return journey Monday to Friday only
781	Meanwood (Stonegate Road) via Pool, Harewood & Alwoodley	Connexionsbuses	2	One return journey Monday to Friday only
820/821	Scar House Reservoir via Blubberhouses & Pateley Bridge	The Keighley Bus Company	2	DalesBus Two return journeys on Summer Sundays. Only one journey per day runs to and from Keighley.
820/821	Keighley via Guiseley, Shipley & Bingley	The Keighley Bus Company	2	DalesBus Two return journeys on Summer Sundays. Only one journey per day runs to and from Keighley.
874	Buckden via Ilkley, Bolton Abbey & Grassington	York Pullman	1	DalesBus One return journey Sundays only, other journeys run Ilkley to Buckden only
874	Wetherby via Headingley, Leeds, Oakwood & Collingham	York Pullman	1	DalesBus One return journey Sundays only, other journeys run Ilkley to Buckden only
923	Wetherby via Pool, Arthington, Harewood, East Keswick, Scarcroft and Collingham	Connexionsbuses	4	Limited service.
940	Holt Park	Connexionsbuses	4	
962	Ilkley via Menston Rail Station and Burley-in-Wharfedale	Connexionsbuses	3	
963	Garnett Wharfe & Menston Rail Station	Connexionsbuses	3	Some journeys run to/from Menston Railway Station only
964	Cambridge Drive	Connexionsbuses	3	
965	Weston, Wharfedale Hospital, Newall and Menston Rail Station	Connexionsbuses	5	Some journeys run via St. Richards Road
A3	Leeds Bradford Airport & Bradford via Guiseley, Shipley & Frizinghall	Flyer (Yorkshire Coastliner)	3	
X52	Harrogate via Pool, Weeton & Pannal	Connexionsbuses	5	One journey in each direction runs via St. Aidans School Monday to Friday during term time.
X84	Ilkley via Burley-in-Wharfedale	First Leeds (Leeds City)	1	
X84	Leeds (City Bus Station) via Bramhope, Weetwood & Headingley [Headingley Line]	First Leeds (Leeds City)	2	
