= Otley =

Market town and civil parish in England

Coordinates: 53.905°N 1.687°W

- Town
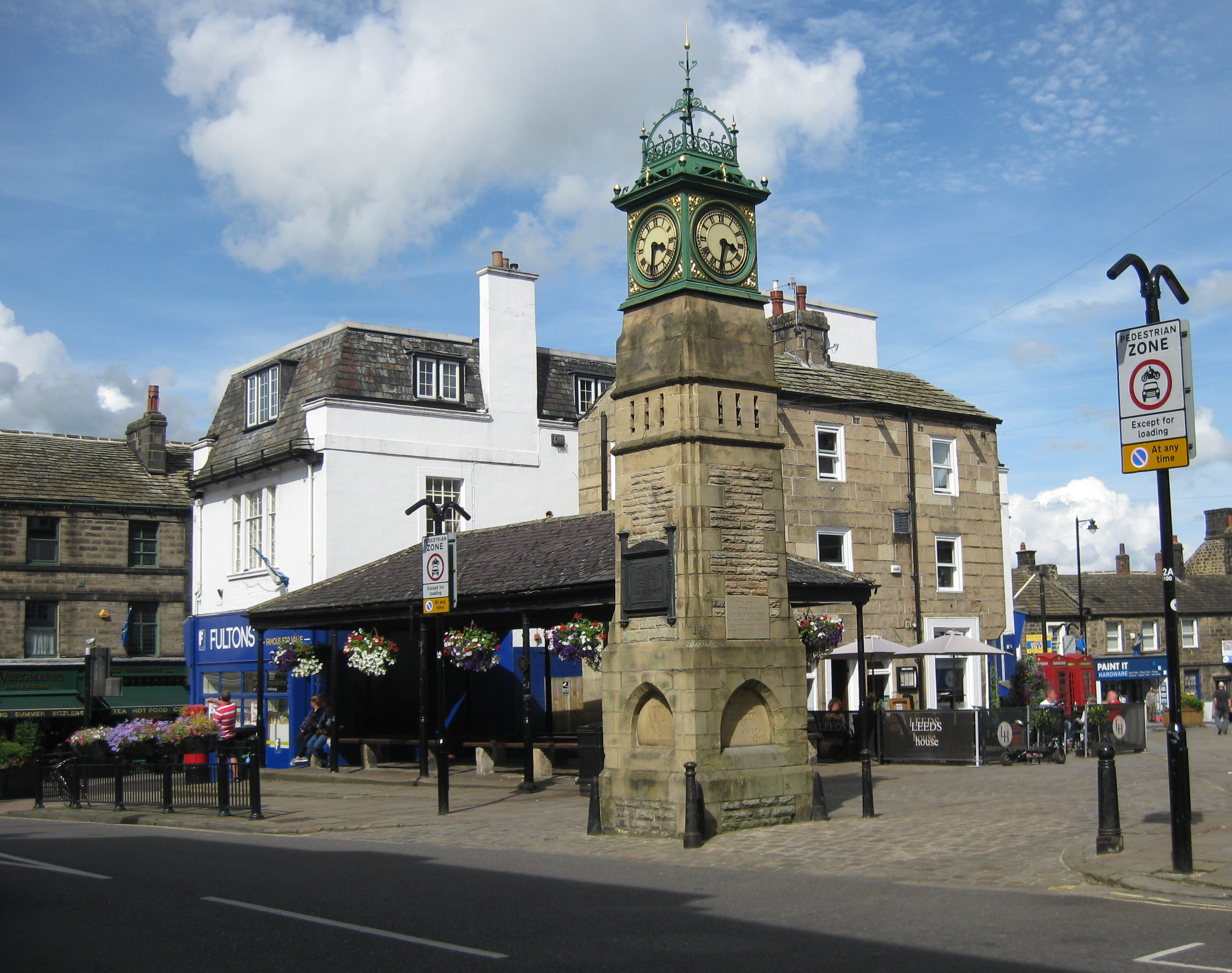
- Jubilee Clock Tower and Buttercross in the Market Place

- Location within City of Leeds Location within West Yorkshire
- Area: 4.59 sq mi (11.9 km^{2})
- Population: 13,669 (2011 census)
  - Density: 2,978/sq mi (1,150/km^{2})
- OS grid reference: SE205455
  - London: 193 miles
- Civil parish: Otley
- Metropolitan borough: City of Leeds
- Metropolitan county: West Yorkshire
- Region: Yorkshire and the Humber
- Country: England
- Sovereign state: United Kingdom
- Post town: OTLEY
- Postcode district: LS21
- Dialling code: 01943
- Police: West Yorkshire
- Fire: West Yorkshire
- Ambulance: Yorkshire
- UK Parliament: Leeds North West

Otley is a market town and civil parish at a bridging point on the River Wharfe, in the City of Leeds metropolitan borough in West Yorkshire, England. Historically a part of the West Riding of Yorkshire, the population was 13,668 at the 2011 census. It is in two parts: south of the river is the historic town of Otley and to the north is Newall, which was formerly a separate township. The town is in lower Wharfedale on the A660 road which connects it to Leeds.

The town is in the Otley and Yeadon ward of Leeds City Council and the Leeds North West parliamentary constituency.

== History ==
=== Toponymy ===
Otley's name is derived from Otto, Otho, Othe, or Otta, a Saxon personal name and leah, a woodland clearing in Old English. It was recorded as Ottanlege in 972 and Otelai or Othelia in the Domesday Book of 1086. The name Chevin has close parallels to the early Brythonic Welsh term Cefn meaning ridge and may be a survival of the ancient Cumbric language.

=== Early history ===
There are pre-historic settlement finds alongside both sides of the River Wharfe and it is believed the valley has been settled at this site since the Bronze Age. There are Bronze Age carvings on rocks situated on top of The Chevin: one such example is the Knotties Stone. West Yorkshire Geology Trust has reference to Otley Chevin and Caley Crags having a rich history of human settlement stretching back into Palaeolithic times. Flint tools, Bronze Age rock carvings and Iron Age earthworks have been found. In medieval times the forest park was used as common pasture land, as a source of wood and sandstones for buildings and walls.

=== Saxon and Medieval ===
The majority of the early development of the town dates from Saxon times and was part of an extensive manor granted by King Æthelstan to the see of York. The Archbishops of York had a residence and were lords of the manor. Their palace was located on the site occupied by the Manor House. Otley is close to Leeds and may have formed part of the kingdom of Elmet. Remains of the Archbishop's Palace were found during the construction of St Joseph's Primary School.

As in other areas of the north, the Norman Conquest largely laid waste this area. The Saxon church was replaced by a Norman one, but this contains much Saxon sculpture. Thus in the 11th and 12th century Otley would have been a loose congregation of buildings around the two focal points of the manor house by the bridge and the church. An important reason for the town's location was a water supply, the Calhead Beck (now covered over) which ran down from Otley Chevin over Whitley Croft, a little East of the church and then to the river near the bridge.

The town grew in the first half of the 13th century when the archbishops laid out burgage (freehold) plots to attract merchants and tradespeople. The burgage plots were on Boroughgate, Walkergate and Kirkgate. This began to create the layout of today, based on a triangle of these plots forming the streets. Bondgate was for the workers: bondsmen and tenants. A leper hospital was founded on the road to Harewood beyond Cross Green.

As well as farming and use of woodland, important local activities were quarrying stone, and the manufacture of potash from bracken, used to make a soap which therefore supported a community carrying out fulling, the cleansing and finishing of woollen cloth on Watergate. The Chevin provided stone for building (and millstones) as well as bracken, wood and common grazing, while the river provided reeds for thatching houses.

=== Industrial Revolution ===
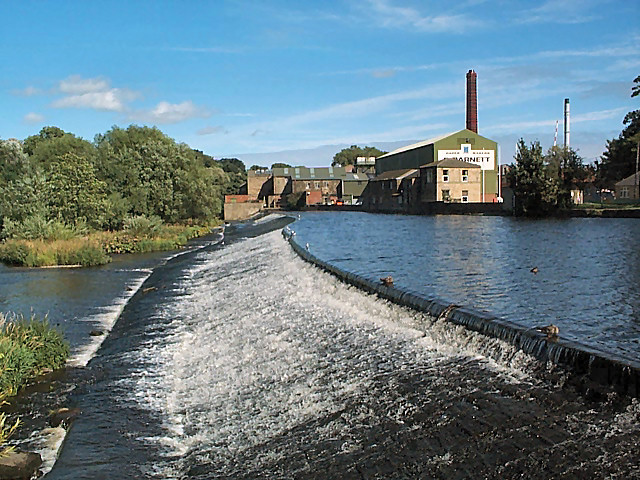
Weir on the River Wharfe at Otley with Garnett's paper mill behind

The woollen industry developed as a cottage industry but during the Industrial Revolution and the mechanisation of the textile industry, mills were built using water then steam power. A cotton mill and weaving shed for calicoes were built by the river in the late 18th century. Later woolcombing and worsted spinning were introduced. By the mid 19th century 500 inhabitants were employed in two worsted-mills, a paper-mill, and other mills. A tannery was established in the 19th century. At this time the opening of the new Leeds Road and Bradford Road greatly increased access for trade. Many houses were built from the middle of the 19th century onwards, including the first row of terraces by the newly formed Otley Building Society from 1847. Otley railway station opened in 1865 connecting goods and people to Leeds, with a connection to Bradford in 1875. At its peak it had 50 trains a day, but it was closed in 1965 under the Beeching cuts. Kirkgate was the first street to be paved in 1866, followed by sewers in 1869.

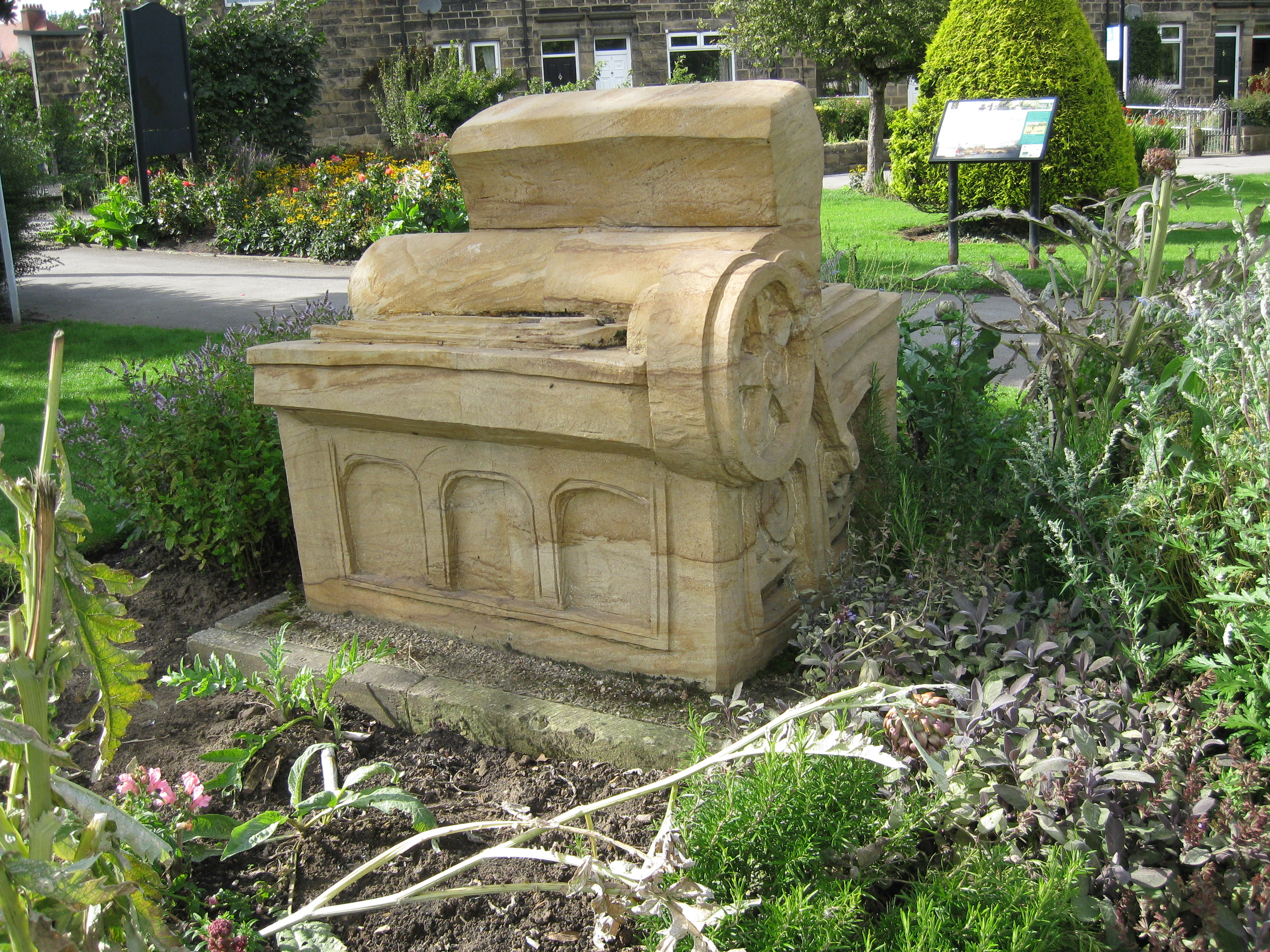
Sculpture of Wharfedale Press in Wharfemeadows Park

The Wharfedale Printing Machine was developed in Otley by William Dawson and David Payne. An early example can be seen in Otley Museum. By 1900 the printing machinery trade, with over 2,000 people employed in seven machine shops, was Otley's most important industry.

=== 20th century onwards ===
During the First World War, Farnley Camp at Otley housed the Northern Command Gas and Grenade School, which taught military personnel about explosives.

After the First World War there was a general shortage of housing in Britain, and much of it was crowded slums. Otley Council prepared one of the first subsidized housing schemes, commencing with relatively open land in Newall on the North of the river in 1920. The 1920s also saw the beginnings of the conversion of properties to a sewer drainage system, and electric lighting instead of gas on the streets.

Further estates followed and by 1955 there were more than 1,000 council houses. Private housing was also expanded during this time, but was greatly reduced in the Second World War. House building revived in the 1960s to 1980s, but industry declined, with many factories closing, including the printing machine works in 1981.

Wharfemeadows park provided leisure space for residents and the River Wharfe a place to swim with public open air swimming baths opening on the site in 1924. By the 1960s the outdoor pool was a popular leisure destination and was in use until 1993 when a fault with the pumping system precipitated its closure. In February 2016, in response to a Leeds City Council invitation for 'Expressions of Interest' for the site of 'the former Otley Lido', a group of local residents launched an ongoing campaign to regenerate the site as a modern open air swimming pool and community centre.

=== Otley Museum ===
Until 2010 Otley Museum was based in the Civic Centre when it was displaced by major redevelopment of the building. In January 2010, its collections, reflecting the town's story from prehistory to the present day, were packed for storage while new premises were sought. A proposal by the Town Council to develop a National Printing Museum based on the printers' engineers collection was criticised by trustees on the basis that printing was just one aspect of the town's history and that demand for such a museum had not been demonstrated. In 2024, while still without a permanent physical home, the museum publicised its new website which will serve as a showcase for photographs of some of the approximately 1900 artefacts that have been curated by volunteers. Visitors can view items from the collection by prior arrangement at its temporary location at Otley Cycle Club.

== Governance ==
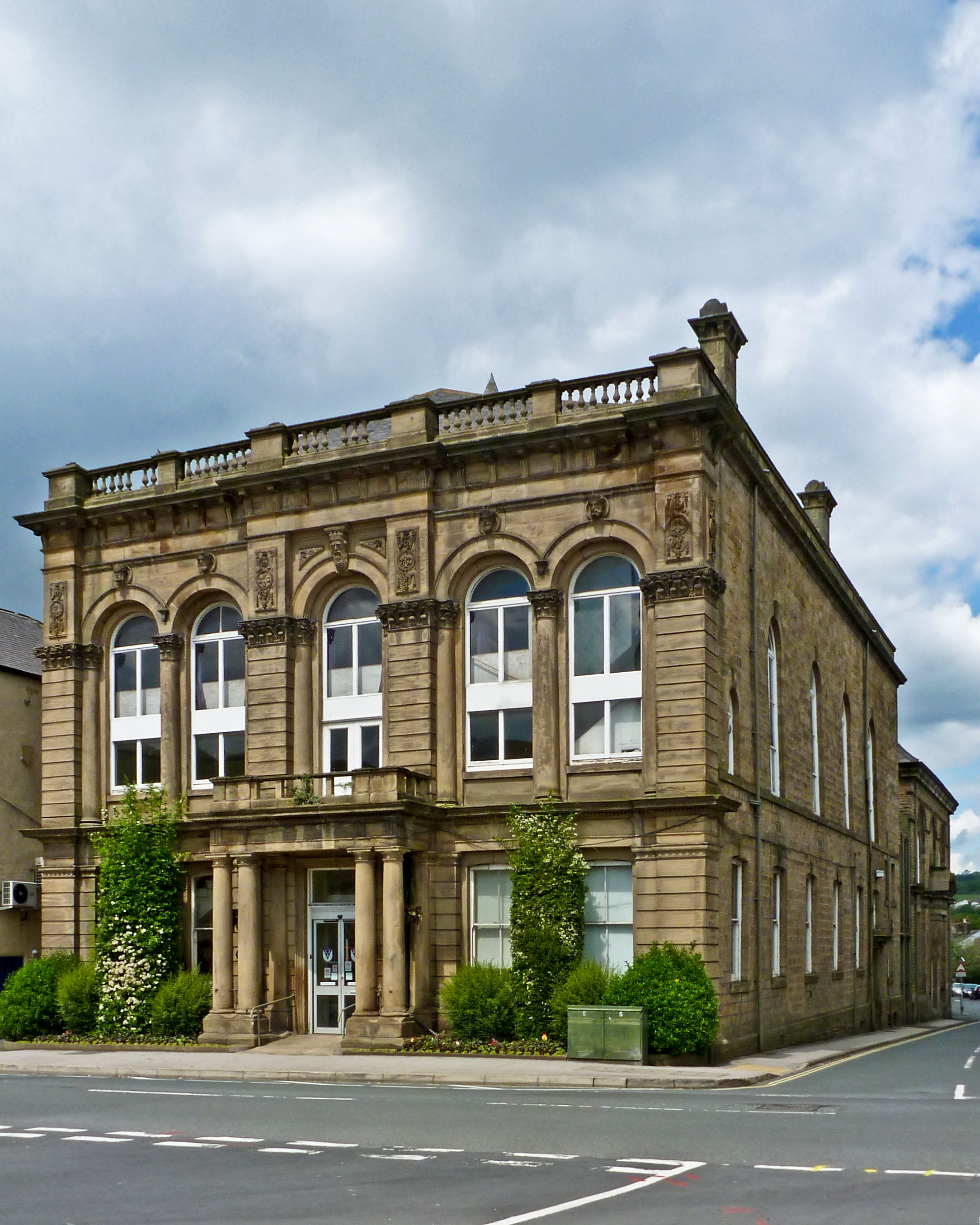
Otley Civic Centre

Historically Otley was a market-town and the centre of a large ecclesiastical parish in the wapentakes of Skyrack and Claro in the West Riding of Yorkshire. The various chapelries and townships in the ancient parish became separate civil parishes in 1866. The local authority was the lord of the manor until 1864 when Otley Board was formed and many public buildings date from then on. From 1894 Otley formed an Urban District, and in 1897 and 1903 expanded north of the River Wharfe to include Newall. Since local government reorganisation in 1974 Otley has been a civil parish in the metropolitan borough of the City of Leeds, in the county of West Yorkshire. The parish council has exercised its option to declare itself a town council. The town council and the Otley Museum were both based at Otley Civic Centre until the building closed in 2010.

Otley lies in the Leeds North West constituency of the UK Parliament and is represented by MP Katie White of the Labour Party. It is part of the Otley & Yeadon ward on Leeds City Council and is represented by three Liberal Democrat Councillors Ryk Downes, Colin Campbell & Sandy Lay. It is twinned with the French town of Montereau-Fault-Yonne, south of Paris.

Otley and Wharfedale ward has a population of 24,000, and Otley itself has a population of 14,348, according to the Census 2001.

== Geography ==
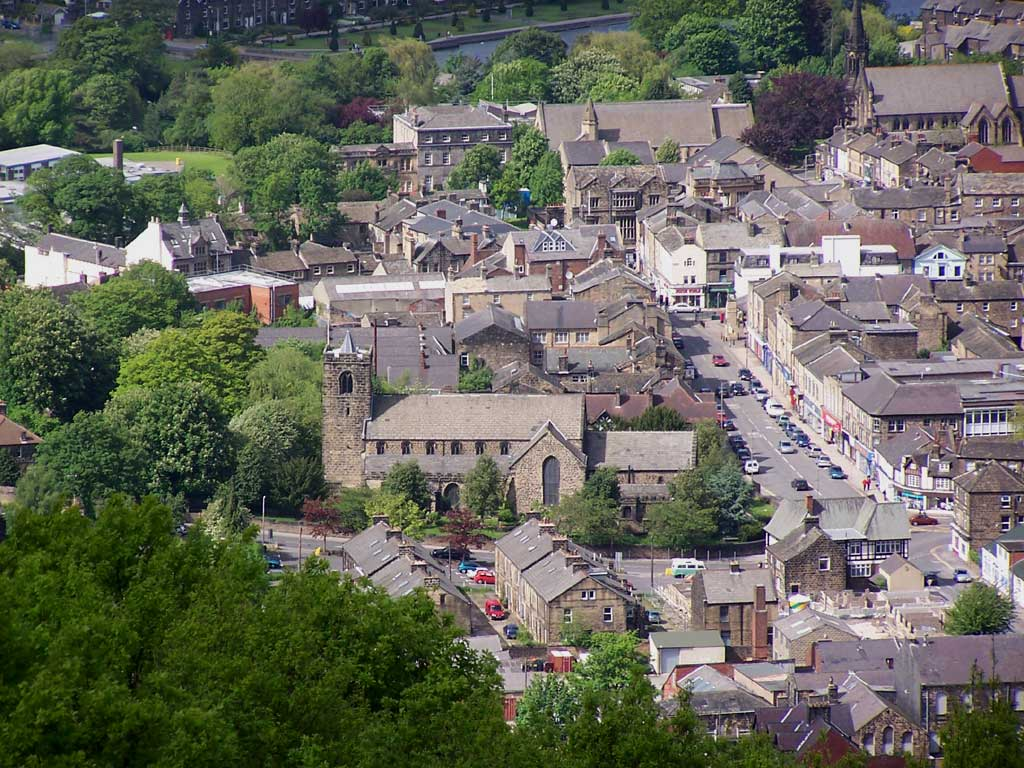
View over Otley

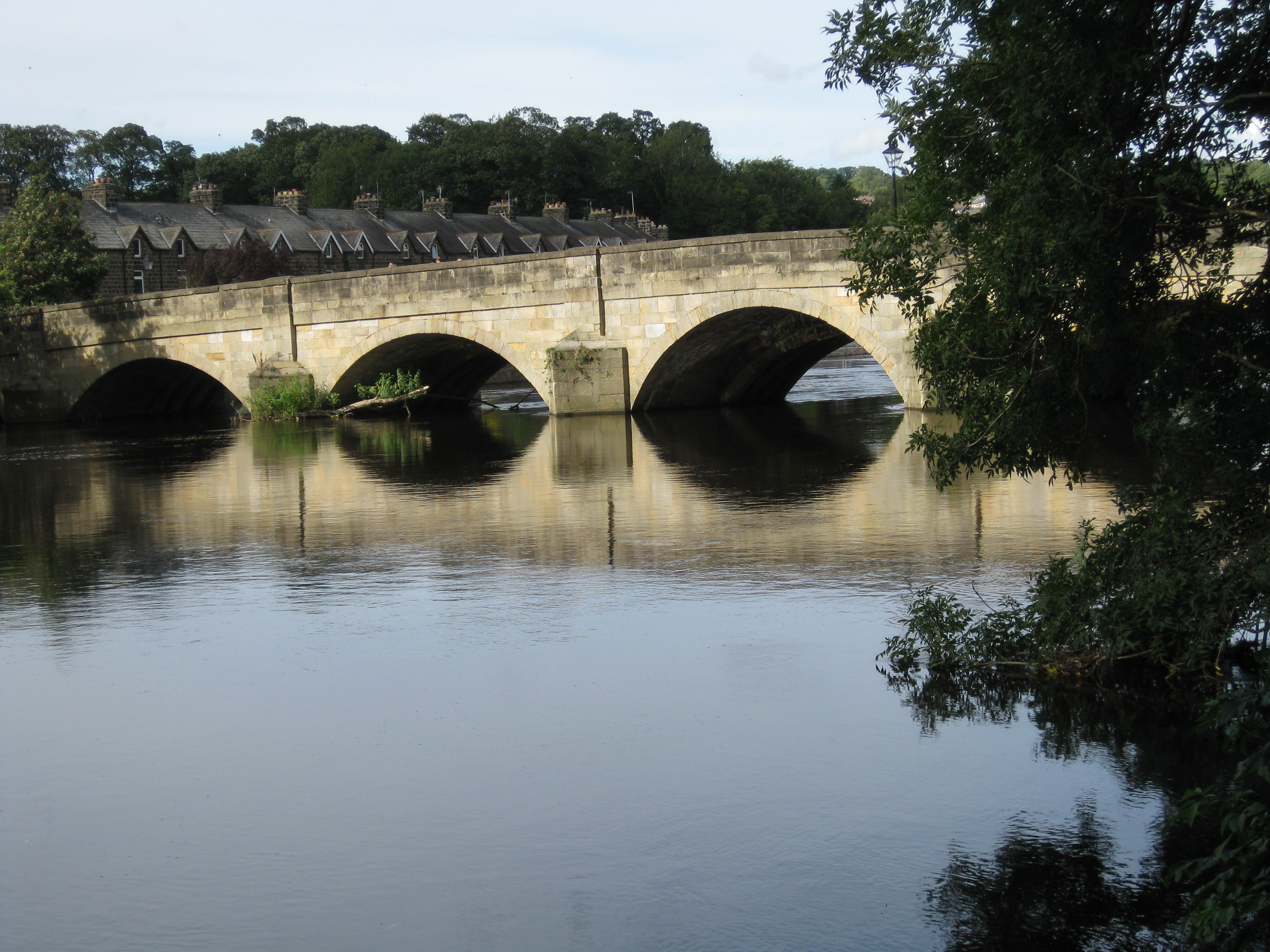
Otley Bridge, viewed from the South and West side

Otley lies 28 miles (45 km) south-west of York, 10 miles (16 km) north-west of Leeds, 10 miles (16 km) north-east of Bradford, and 196 miles (315 km) from London. The town lies in lower Wharfedale, at a bridging point over the River Wharfe where there is a seven-arched medieval bridge, and is surrounded by arable farmland. The historic town developed on the south bank of the Wharfe, but in the 20th century Otley expanded north of the river, to include new developments at Newall and the Weston Estate.

The south side of the valley is dominated by a gritstone escarpment overlooking Otley called the Chevin and to the north is Newall Carr. In 1944, Major Le G.G.W. Horton Fawkes of Farnley Hall donated 263 acres (106 ha) of land on the Chevin to the people of Otley. This has been expanded to 700 acres (280 ha) and constitutes Chevin Forest Park. It was from a quarry on the Chevin that the foundation stones for the Houses of Parliament were hewn.

To the east and west of Otley are flooded gravel pits, where sand and gravel have been extracted in the 20th century. The gravel pits to the east at Knotford Nook are a noted birdwatching site. Those to the west are devoted to angling and sailing.

To the west are the villages of Burley in Wharfedale and Menston. To the east is Pool-in-Wharfedale. To the south is the towns of Guiseley, and Yeadon.

== Transport ==
Roman roads bypassed Otley, South of the Chevin and North of Timble, so most of roads in the area were little better than tracks until the 18th century when efforts were made to facilitate trade. By 1820 there was a regular post coach to Leeds on 4 days a week and 9 carriers delivering as far as Manchester. In 1840 and 1841 new roads to Leeds and Bradford were opened. From 1900 the first motor vehicles appeared in Otley, and in 1912 a motor haulage business started with a vehicle with interchangeable bodies so that it could work as either as lorry or charabanc. By 1930 there were bus companies operating and in 1939 Otley bus station opened. Trolleybuses operated by Leeds Corporation Tramways arrived in 1915, but ceased in 1928.

The Otley and Ilkley Joint Railway opened Otley railway station in 1865 and closed in March 1965; the town bypass follows the part of the line of the old railway. The trackbed between Burley in Wharfedale, Otley and Pool is to become a cycleway, footpath and equestrian route known as the Wharfedale Greenway, with possible extensions onward to Ilkley alongside the extant railway. Planning permission for the first phase of the greenway was granted in July 2020.

The main roads through the town are the A660 to the south east, which connects Otley to Bramhope, Adel and Leeds city centre, and the A65 to the west, which goes to Ilkley and Skipton. The A6038 heads to Guiseley, Shipley and Bradford, connecting with the A65. To Harrogate, the A659 heads east to the A658, which is the main Bradford–Harrogate road.

Otley bus station is run by West Yorkshire Metro and services are operated by First West Yorkshire, Harrogate Bus Company, Keighley Bus Company, and Connexionsbuses. There are local services connecting the town and outlying areas.

== Notable features ==
=== Otley Bridge and riverside ===
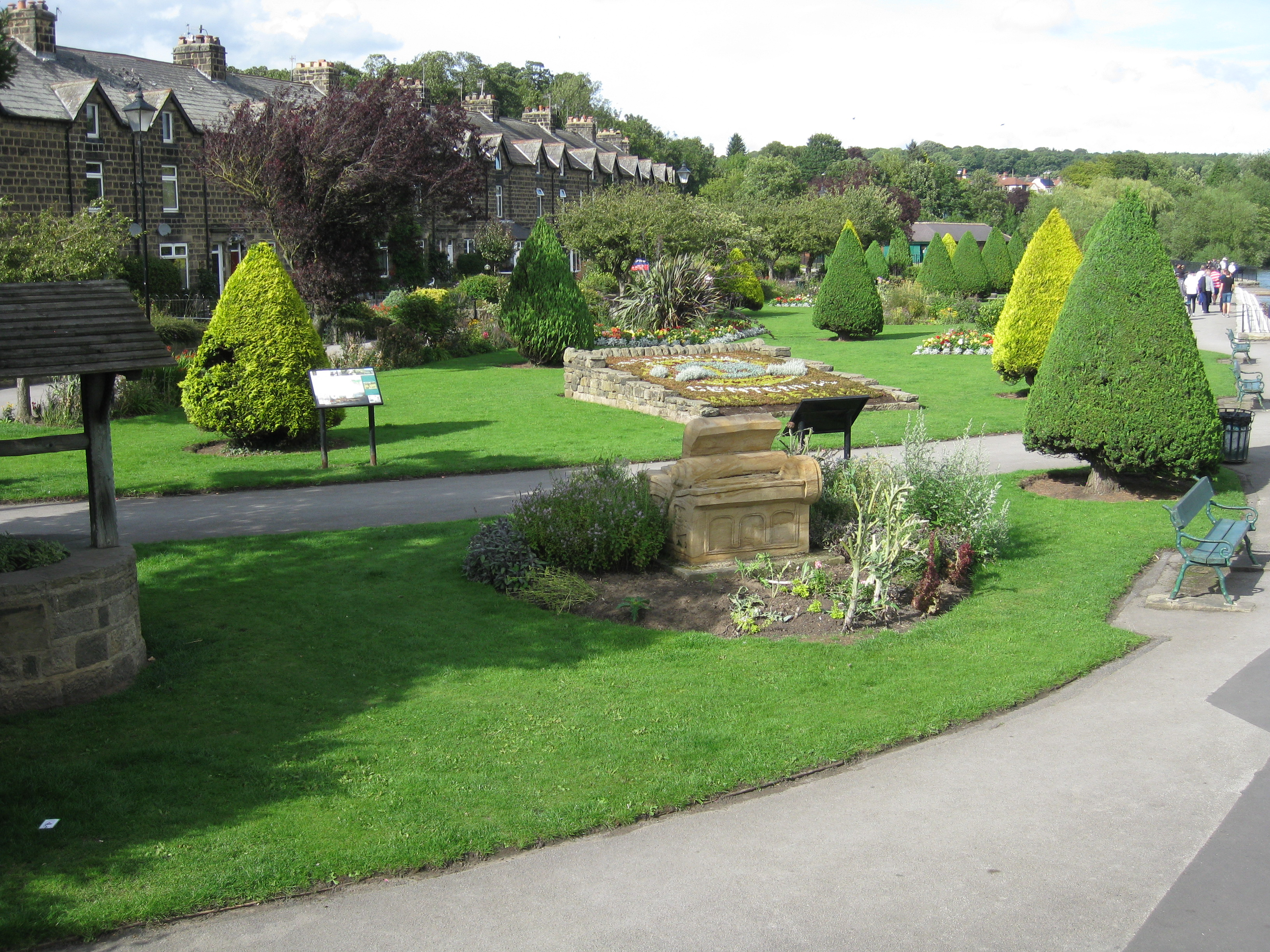
Wharfemeadows Park

Otley Bridge is a 7 span stone bridge and Scheduled Ancient Monument, dating from 1228, which was rebuilt after the flood of 1673 and widened in 1776. In 1957 a concrete cantilevered footwalk was added to separate pedestrians from road traffic. On the north side eastwards, 2 miles of the riverbank is Wharfemeadows Park with extensive gardens on land donated to the town in 1924 by the Fawkes family. It originally had an open-air swimming pool. Opposite on the south side is the much smaller Tittybottle Park, originally designated Manor Park in 1909 but it acquired its popular (and now official) name for its popularity with mothers and nannies. On the south side westward, is Manor Garth Park, formerly part of the land of the manor house. About 0.6 miles (1 km) east of the bridge is Gallows Hill, where the medieval gallows stood. Low-lying land by this was formerly a sewage works, but was bought by the Town Council in the 1980s and developed into Gallows Hill nature reserve.

=== Market Place ===
While markets have been held from at least 1227 it has only been in the current Market Place from about 1800. It contains the Buttercross (covered area for farm produce, now used for occasional charity events, otherwise rest and shelter for visitors) and the Jubilee Clock, which was erected in 1888 at a cost of £175. It has two plaques, one in memory to two locals killed in the Transvaal War and one expressing the gratitude of Belgian refugees who came to Otley during the First World War. Many of the buildings around are listed.

== Education ==
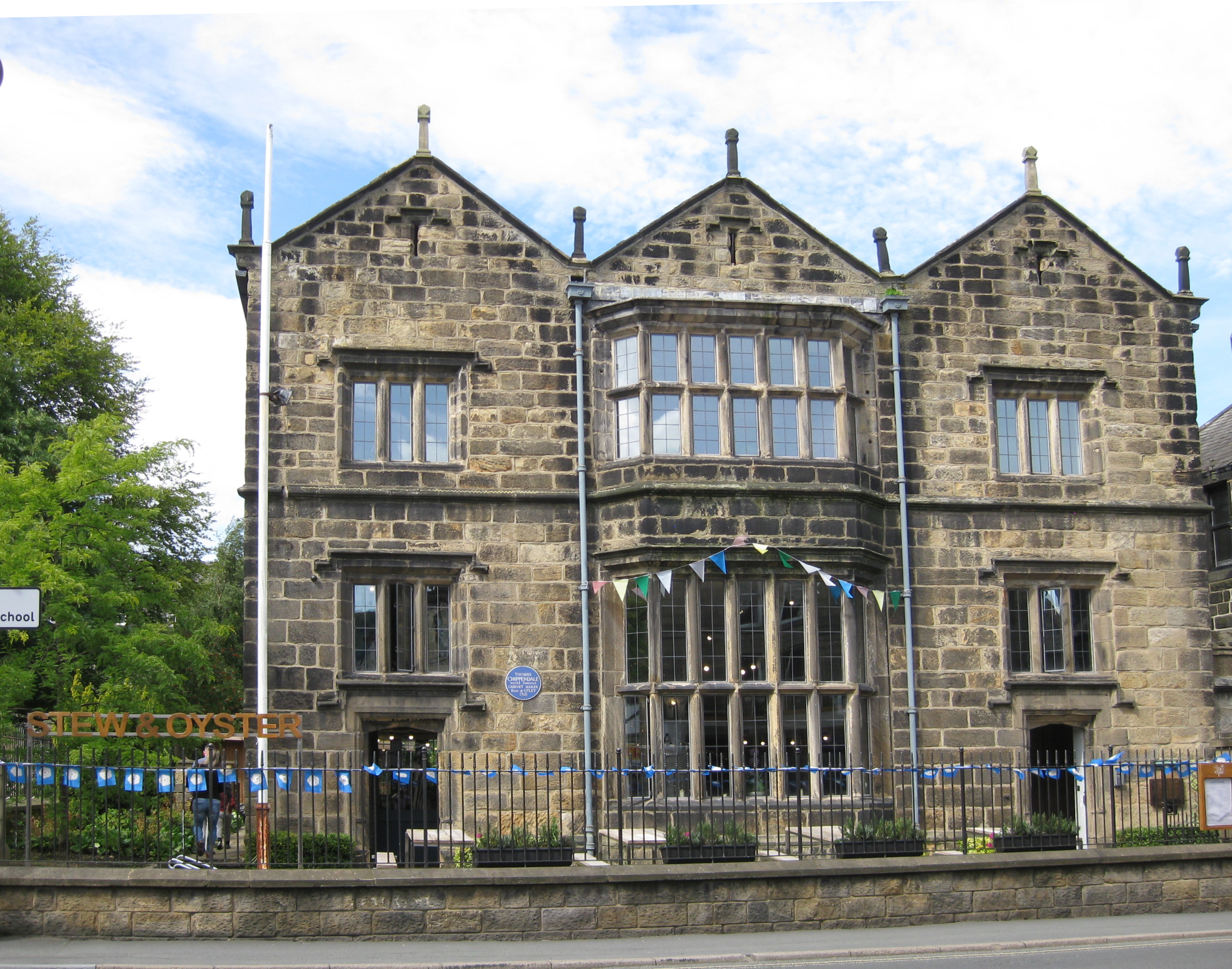
Prince Henry's Grammar School old premises

A grammar school was founded by Royal Charter issued to Thomas Cave in 1607 by King James VI and I, who named it "The Grammar School of Prince Henry". The single storey building was pulled down and rebuilt in the Elizabethan style with two storeys in 1840. It closed in 1878 and was used as a court-house, and in recent times has been commercial premises, then a public house until closure in 2020. In 1918 the foundation was re-established in temporary premises and in 1925 Prince Henry's Grammar School, Otley, in Farnley Lane opened.

Otley has a number of primary schools.

== Religion ==
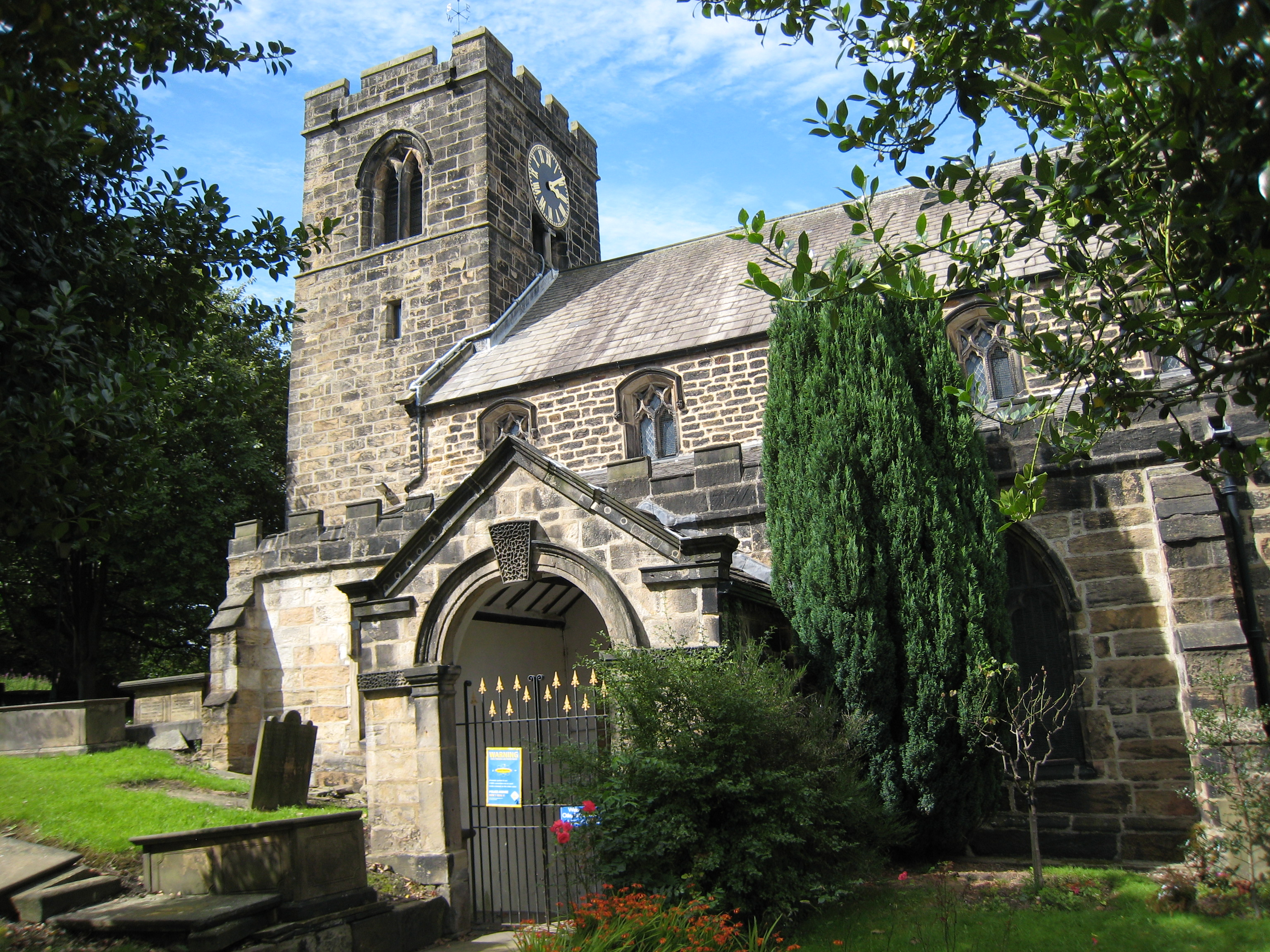
All Saints' Parish Church.

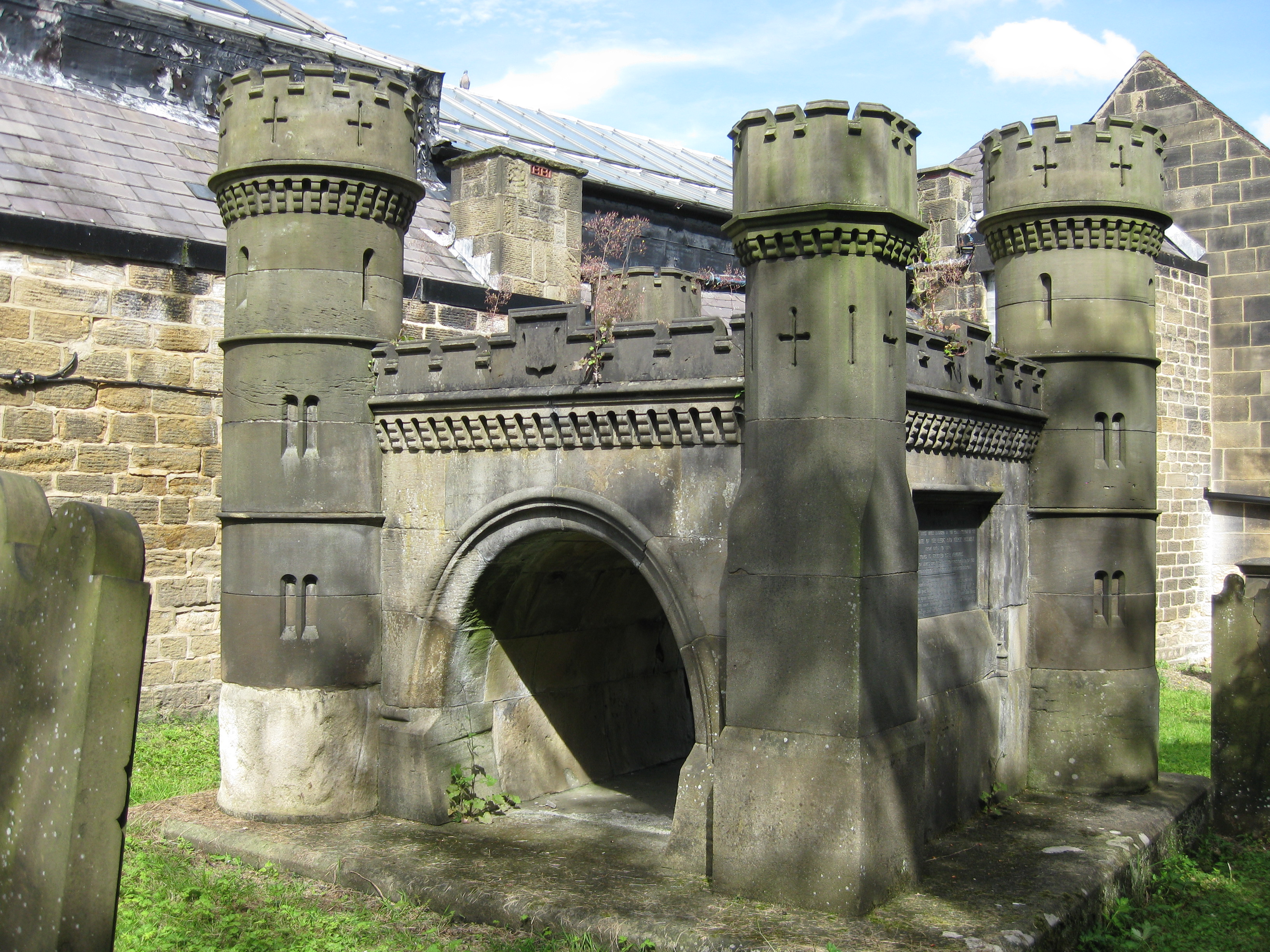
Navvies' Monument

Otley's first church was built in the early 7th century, made of wood, but was burnt down. The Parish Church (All Saints) originates from Saxon times and contains the remains of two early Anglo-Saxon crosses, one of which has been reproduced for the town's war memorial. The present building is based on a Norman church from the 12th century but little of the original remains, except the north doorway. Substantial changes were made in the 13th, 14th and 18th century, with the Tower Clock dating from 1793. This church was the centre of an ancient ecclesiastical parish which comprised the chapelries of Baildon, Bramhope, Burley in Wharfedale, Denton, and Farnley, and the townships of Esholt, Hawksworth, Lindley, Menston, Newall with Clifton, Pool-in-Wharfedale, and Little Timble.

The graveyard contains the "Navvies' Monument", a replica of the entrance to Bramhope Tunnel, a monument to those killed during its construction. Inside the church is the tomb of the grandparents of Thomas Fairfax who commanded Parliament's forces at the Battle of Marston Moor in 1644.

The Bridge Church was originally the Salem Chapel, built in 1826, being for many years the Congregational Church but having its present name from 1972 with the formation of the United Reformed Church. The church also operated a church hall in Newall Carr Road, some 1.5 miles (2.4 km) from the church, until the hall was declared redundant.

Our Lady and All Saints Roman Catholic Church was opened in 1851.

What is now Beech Hill Church started life in 1916 as 'Bethel Gospel Mission' and moved to its current location on Westgate in 2021.

Methodist preacher John Wesley was a frequent visitor to the town in the 18th century. Allegedly his horse died in the town and is buried in the grounds of the parish church. Its grave is marked by an unusual stone, also known locally as the "Donkey Stone". His Journal for 1761 reads, "6 July Monday; In the evening I preached at Otley and afterwards talked with many of the Society. There is reason to believe that ten or twelve of these are filled with the love of God." Wesley Street is named after him. A chapel was established on Walkergate in about 1800, replaced by a larger one on Westgate in 1857: a third Chapel (now Trinity Methodist Church) was built on Boroughate in 1876.

A Primitive Methodist Chapel opened on New Market in 1835, and became the Salvation Army Citadel which closed in 2019. A Primitive Church on Station Road opened in 1874 and closed in 1965 (it is now residences). Another Primitive Church on Craven Street opened in 1901 and closed in the early 1950s. It is now the headquarters of 2nd Otley Scouts, and is known as the Chevin Community Centre.

An 1890 Quaker meeting house on Cross Green is now a Gospel Hall. Otley Quakers now meet at the former Courthouse on the last Sunday of each month.

Other Christian groups meet in members' homes or rented rooms.

== Culture and community ==
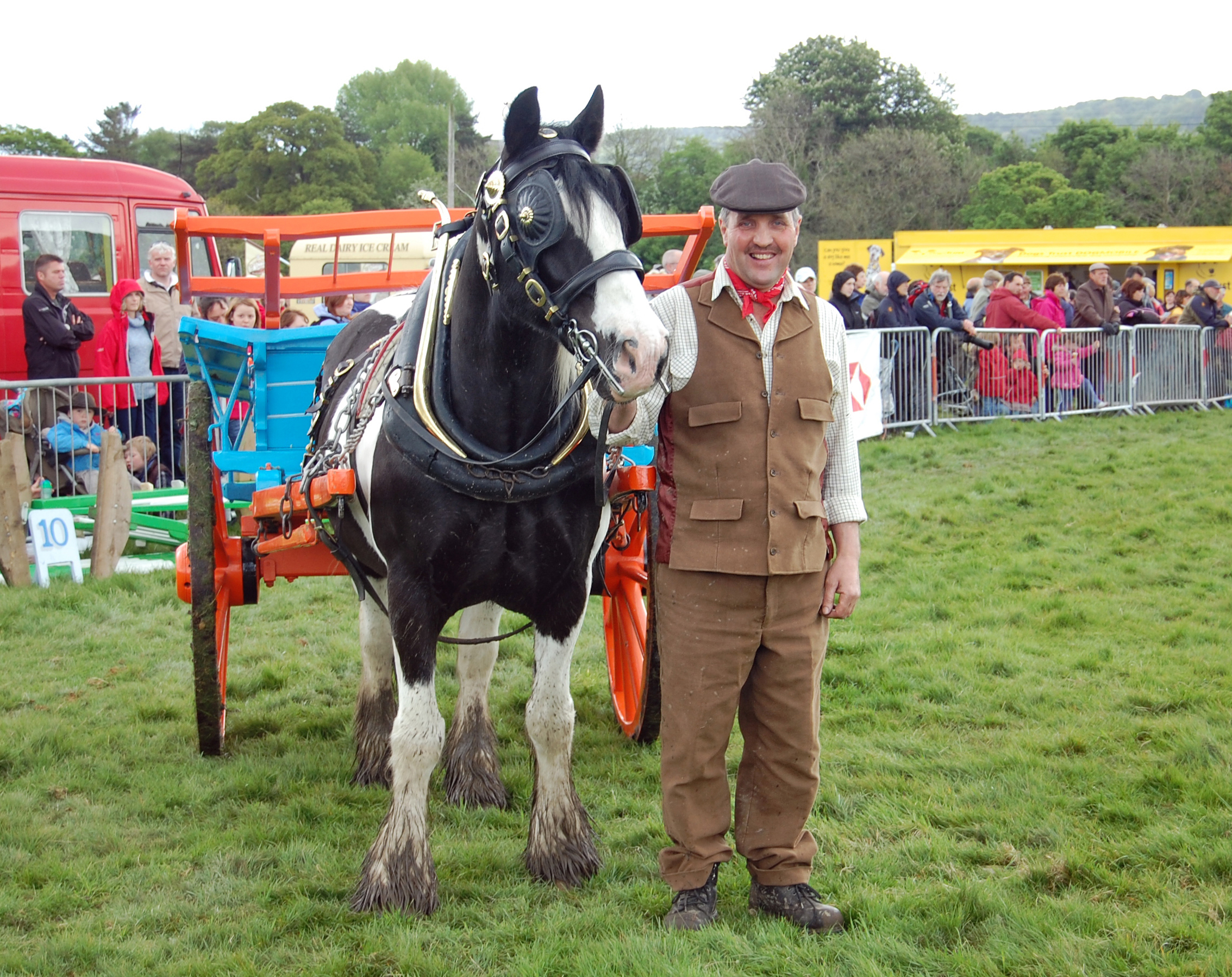
Otley Show in 2009.

Otley has a diverse range of cultural organisations. It has five active Morris dance sides, the Wharfedale Wayzgoose (Border), The Buttercross Belles (Ladies Northwest), Flash Company (Border, Molly, Appalachian & Clog), Hellz Bellz (Contemporary) and Kitchen Taps (Appalachian Step).

Drama groups include the Otley Community Players, Otley Youth Theatre (OY), and a thriving arts centre in the former courthouse. There is a poetry society, which meets monthly in the Black Horse Hotel. The town has a Brass Band who perform at many events in the town. It is not a regular contesting band, but won first prize in the unregistered section at their first contest at Hardraw Scar in September 2007 and again in 2008. Since then they have competed in the 1st to 3rd section winning Second prize and Best March in 2014.

Otley hosts the annual Otley Folk Festival in September, a Victorian Fayre in December, a carnival in June, and, in May, what is reputed to be the oldest one day agricultural show in the country. This celebrated its bicentenary in 2009. There is a beer festival, organised by the church, in November. Otley has four Scout troops, Otley Parish, Otley Bridge, 2nd Otley, and Otley Methodist Scouts. An Army Cadet Force detachment is also located in the town.

In January 2013 The Guardian newspaper featured an article in its Weekend section entitled Let's move to Otley, West Yorkshire.

=== Hostelries ===
The Black Horse Hotel (original demolished, current from 1901 and the Royal White Horse Hotel (the former Barclays Bank (closed 2019), in Manor Square) were the original posting houses and many of the others were coaching inns. By 1900 there were over 30 inns, and Otley was said to have "a pub on every corner". This reputation has continued into recent years with BBC Radio 4's statistics programme "More or Less" concluding that it had the greatest number per head of population.

Today there are 20 pubs in the town although the Roebuck (formerly known as the Spite), the Chevin and the Royalty are on the outskirts, with the Roebuck located in North Yorkshire. Some of the oldest buildings have been demolished or replaced, but the Red Lion on Kirkgate dates from 1745, the Bowling Green from 1757 (originally a courthouse), the Rose & Crown (originally cottages) 1731. The Old Grammar School was (as of 2017) the Stew and Oyster pub, this closed in January 2020. The Old Cock on Crossgate (despite its name) has only recently become a pub, but inhabits former cottages from 1757. These are all Grade II listed buildings.

The Black Bull in the Market Place, was allegedly drunk dry by Cromwell's troops on the night before the battle of Marston Moor during the English Civil War and has a 15th-century well in the beer garden.

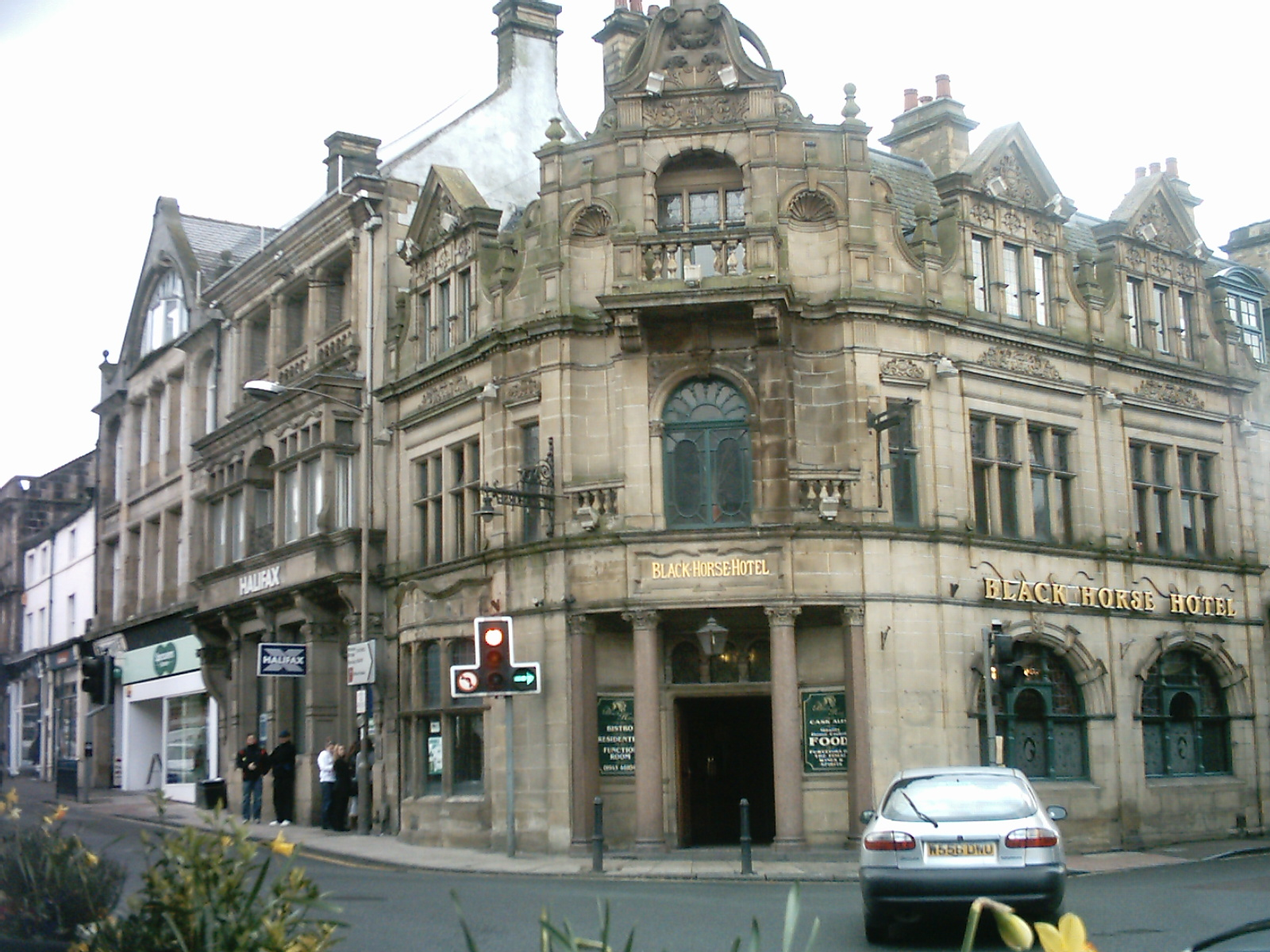
Black Horse Hotel

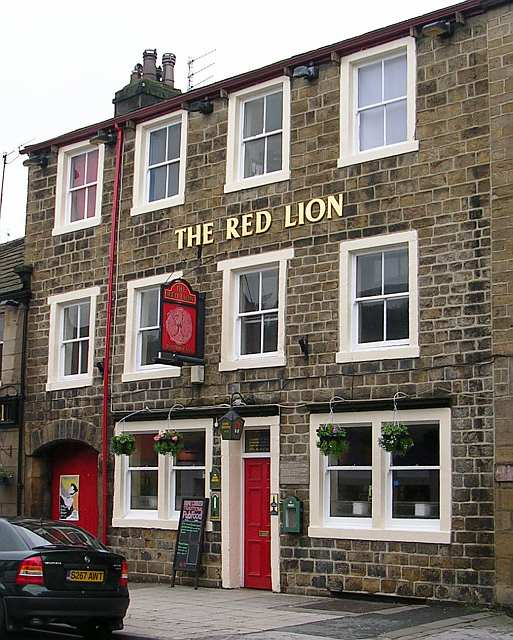
Red Lion

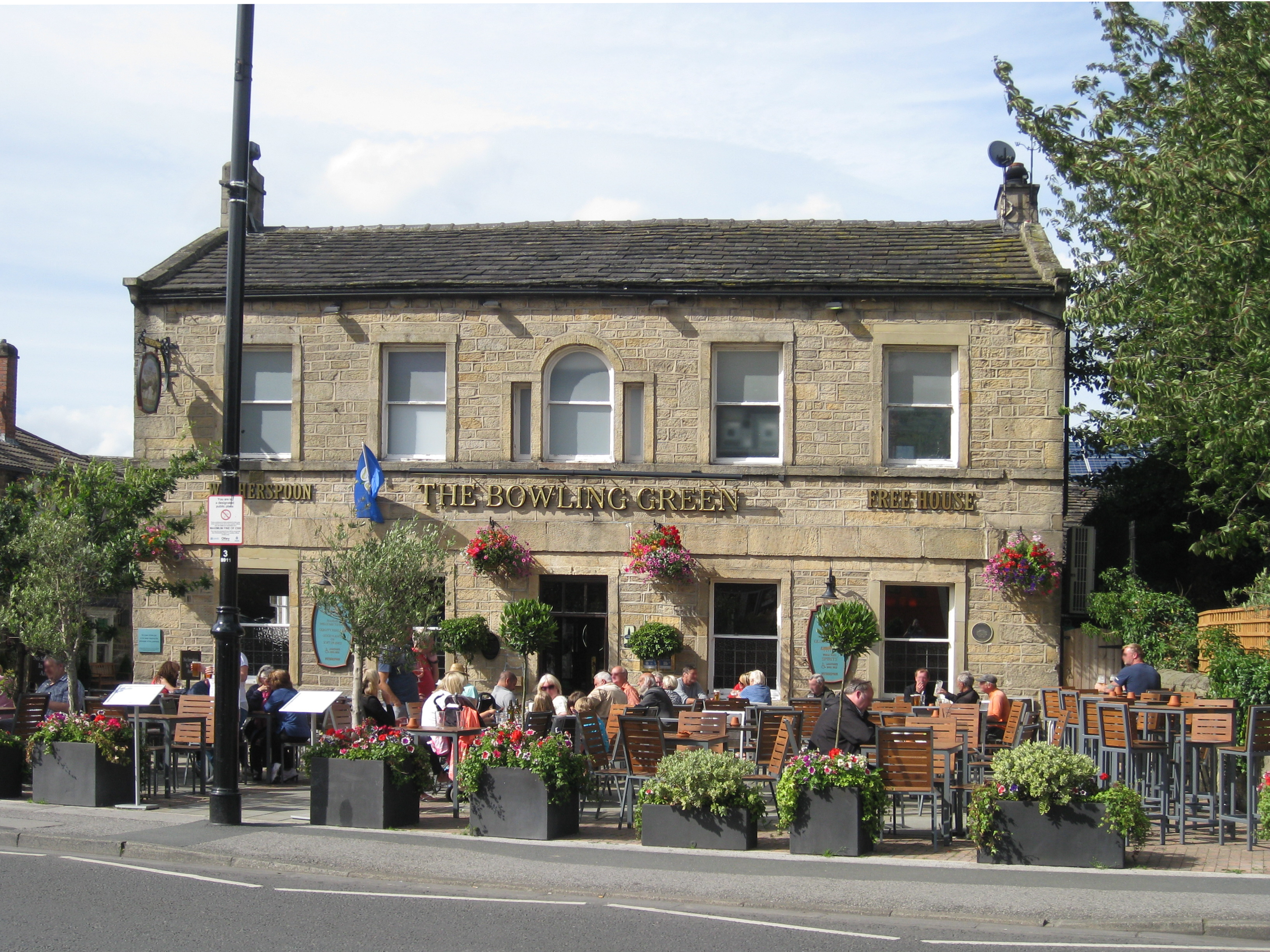
The Bowling Green

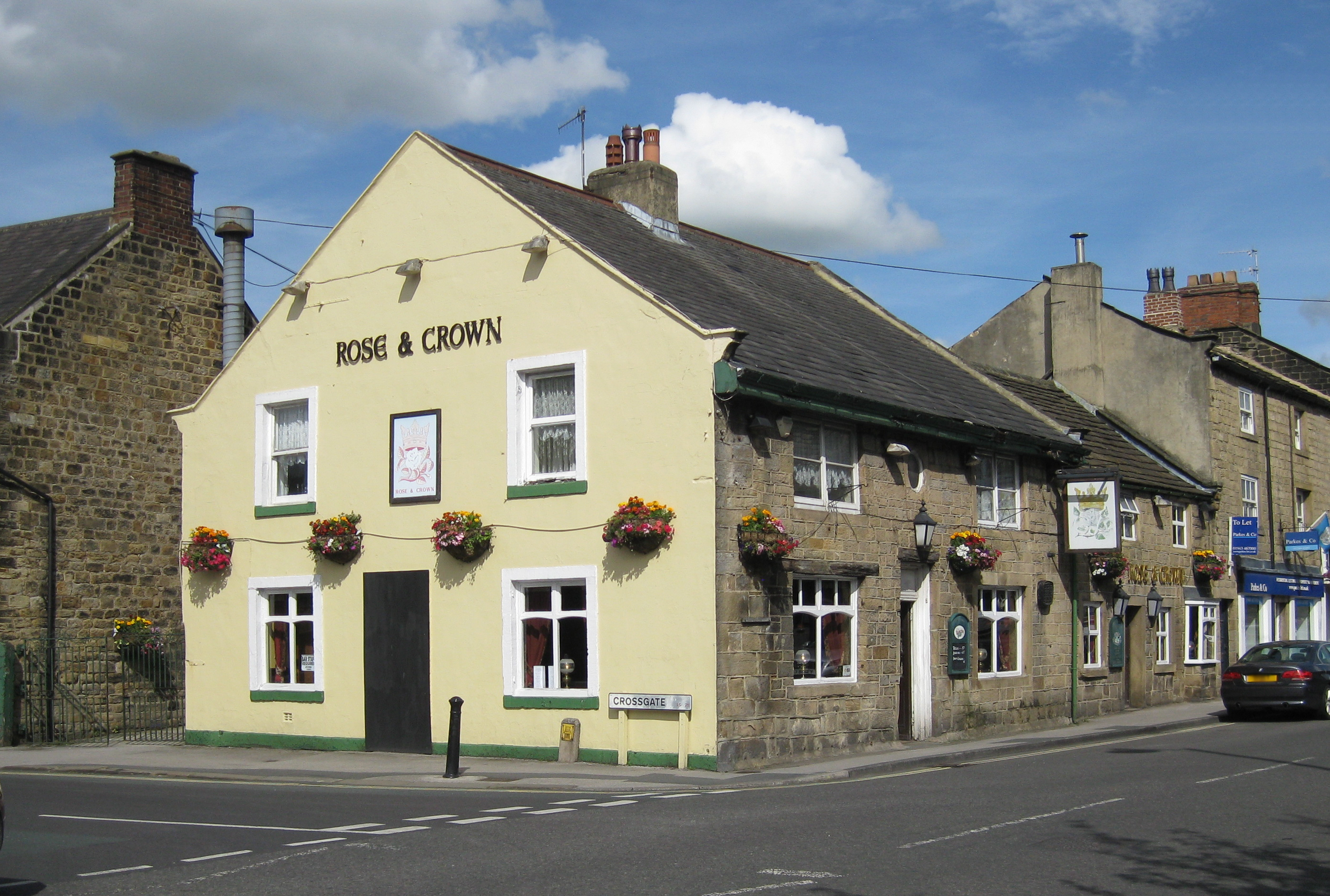
Rose and Crown

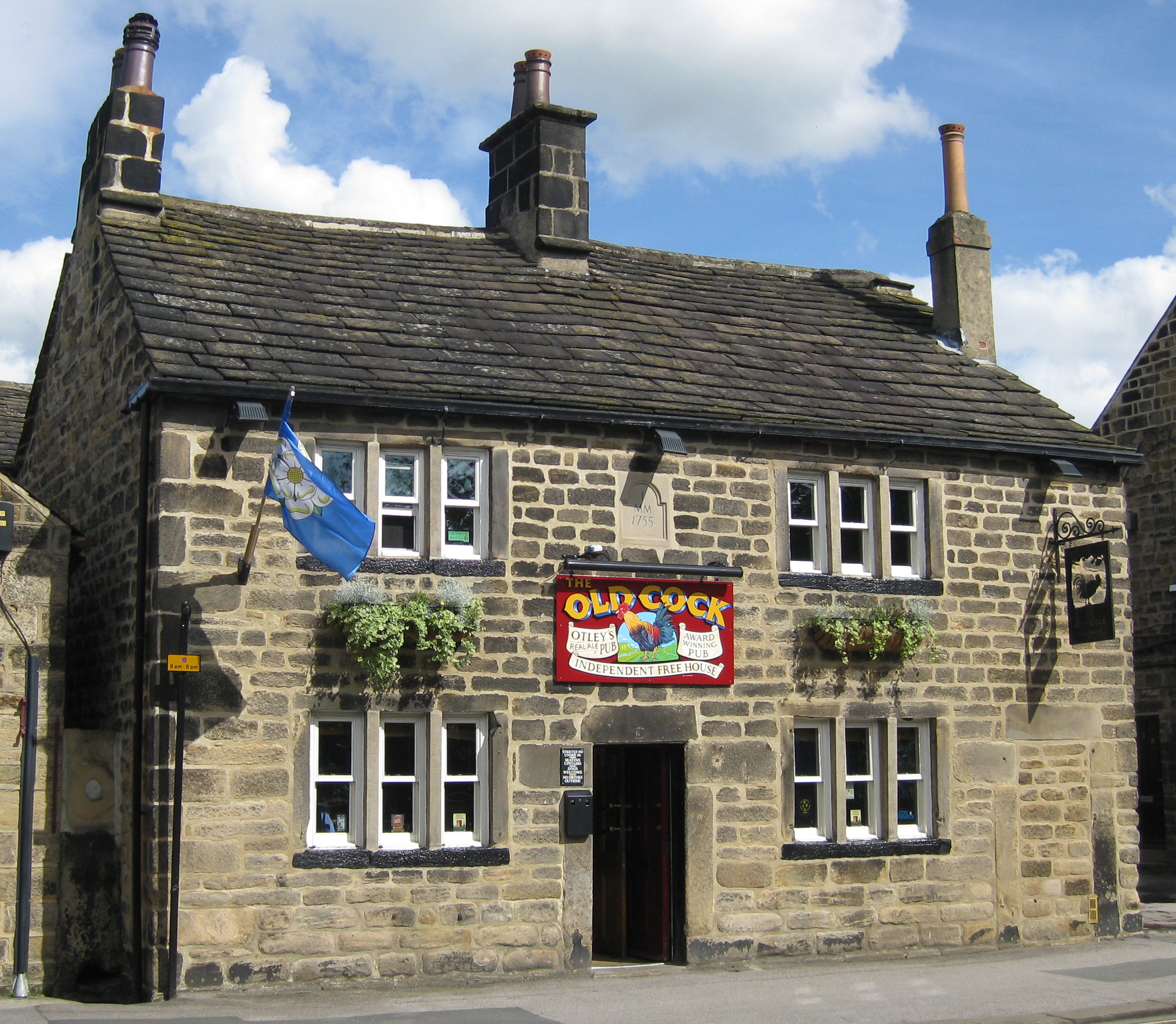
Old Cock

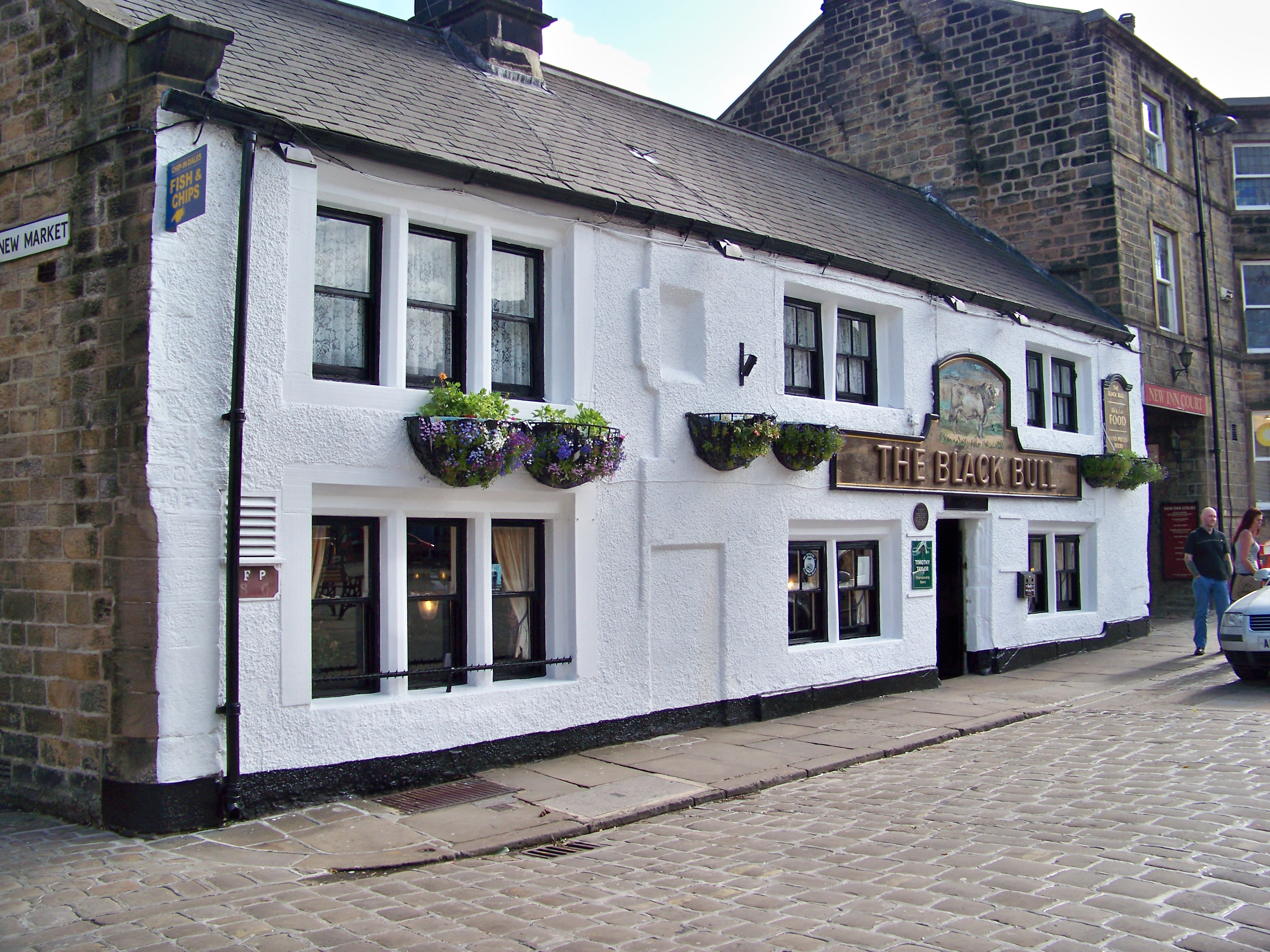
Black Bull

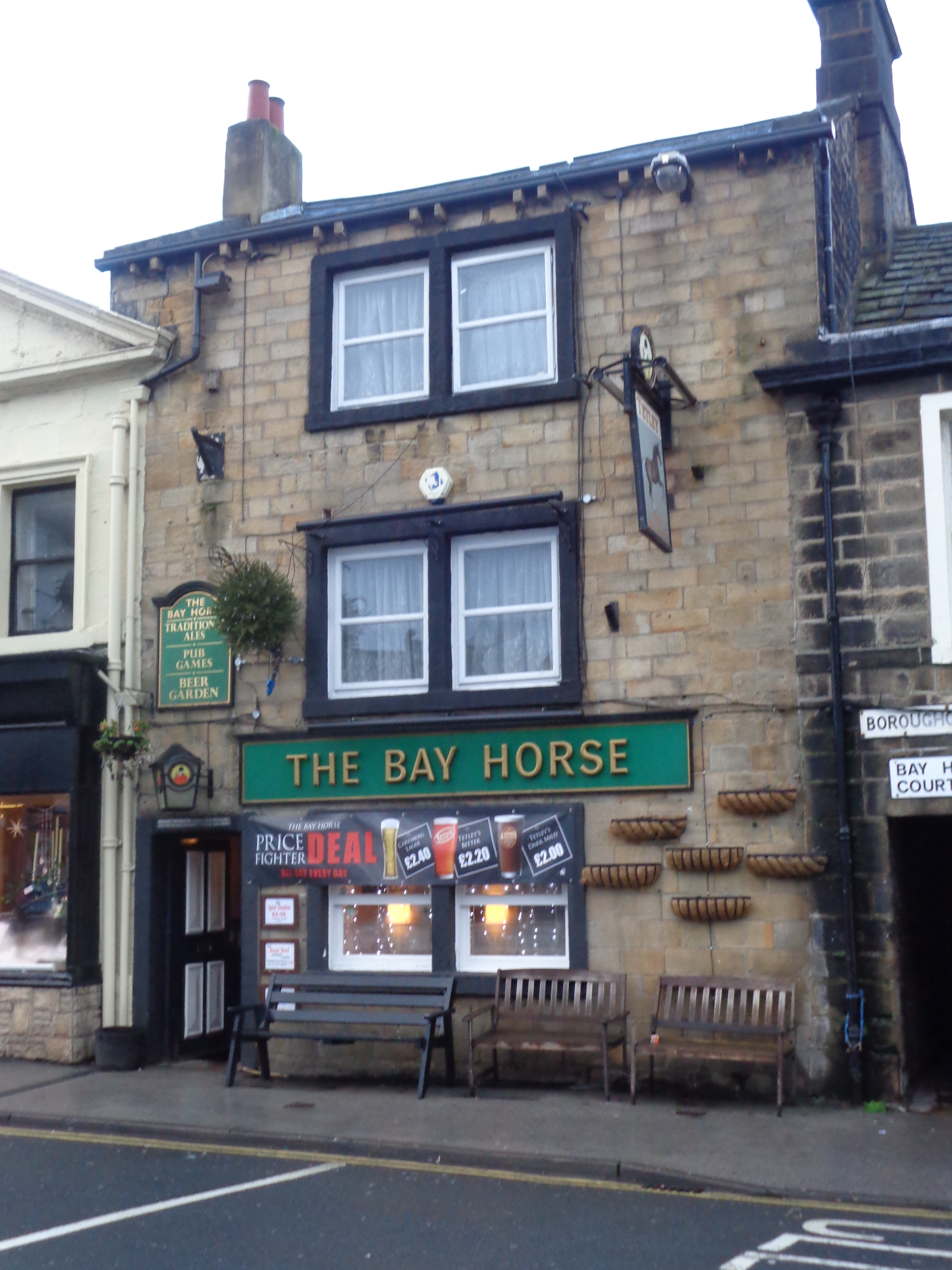
Bay Horse

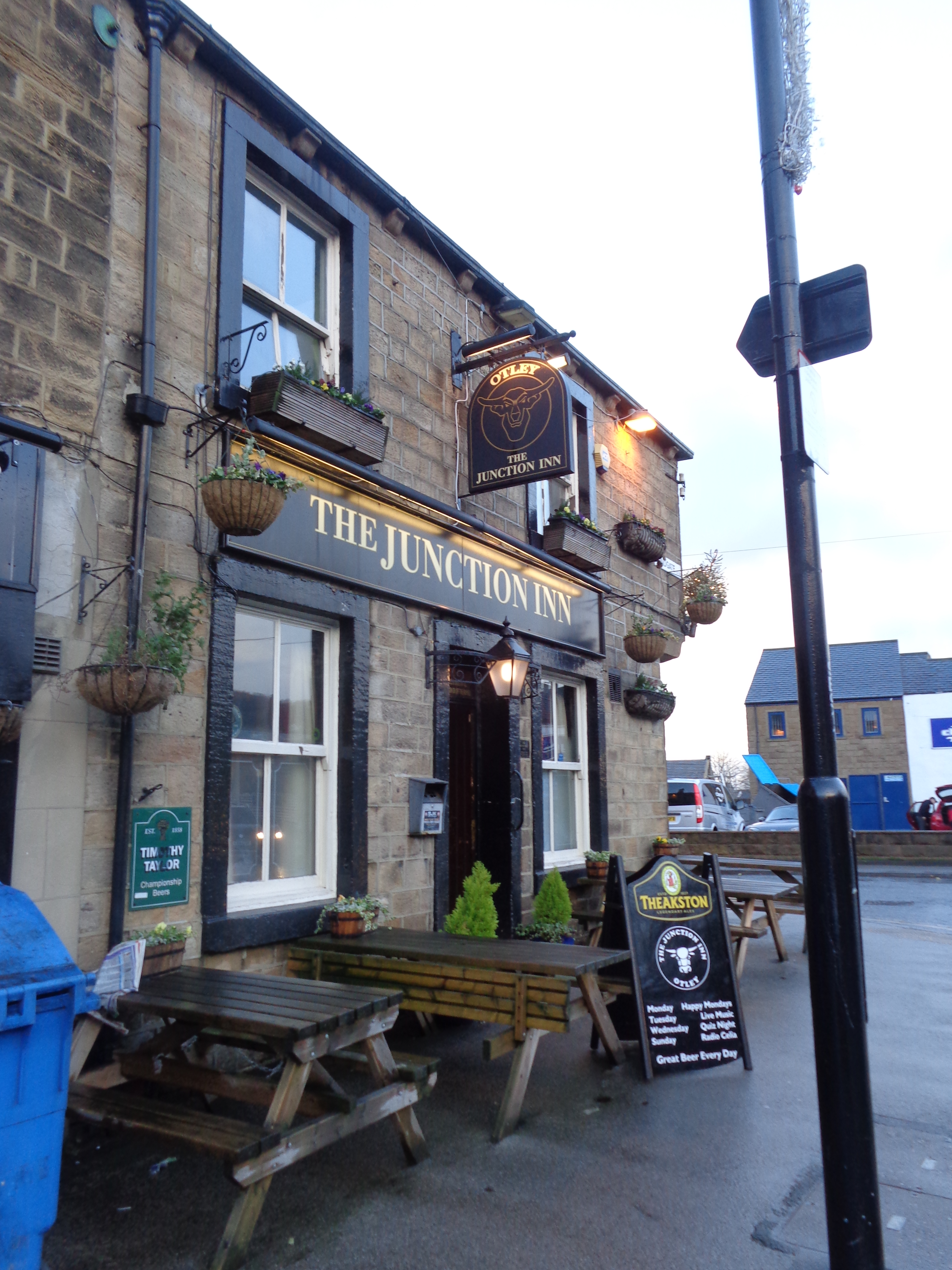
The Junction Inn

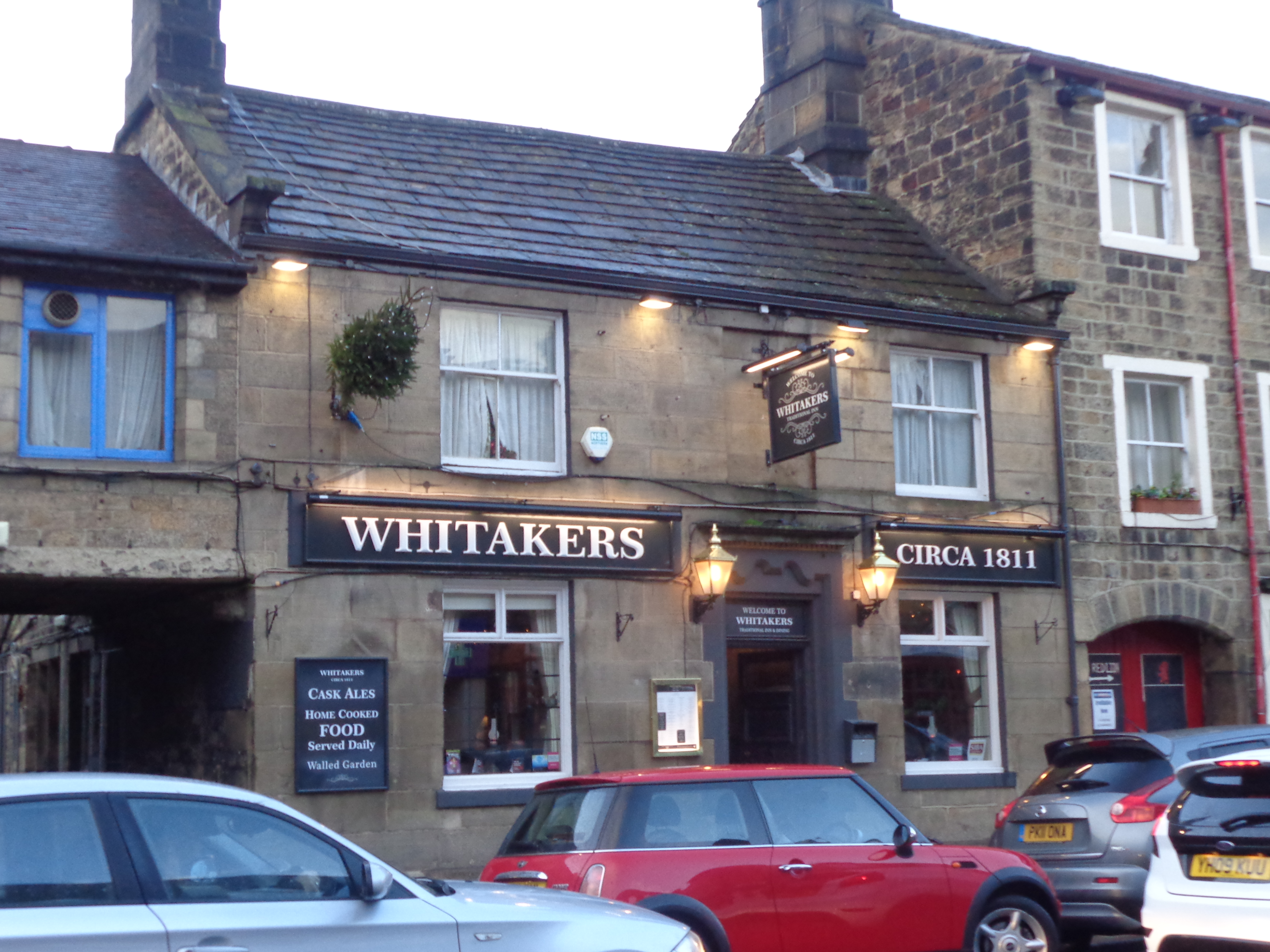
Whitakers

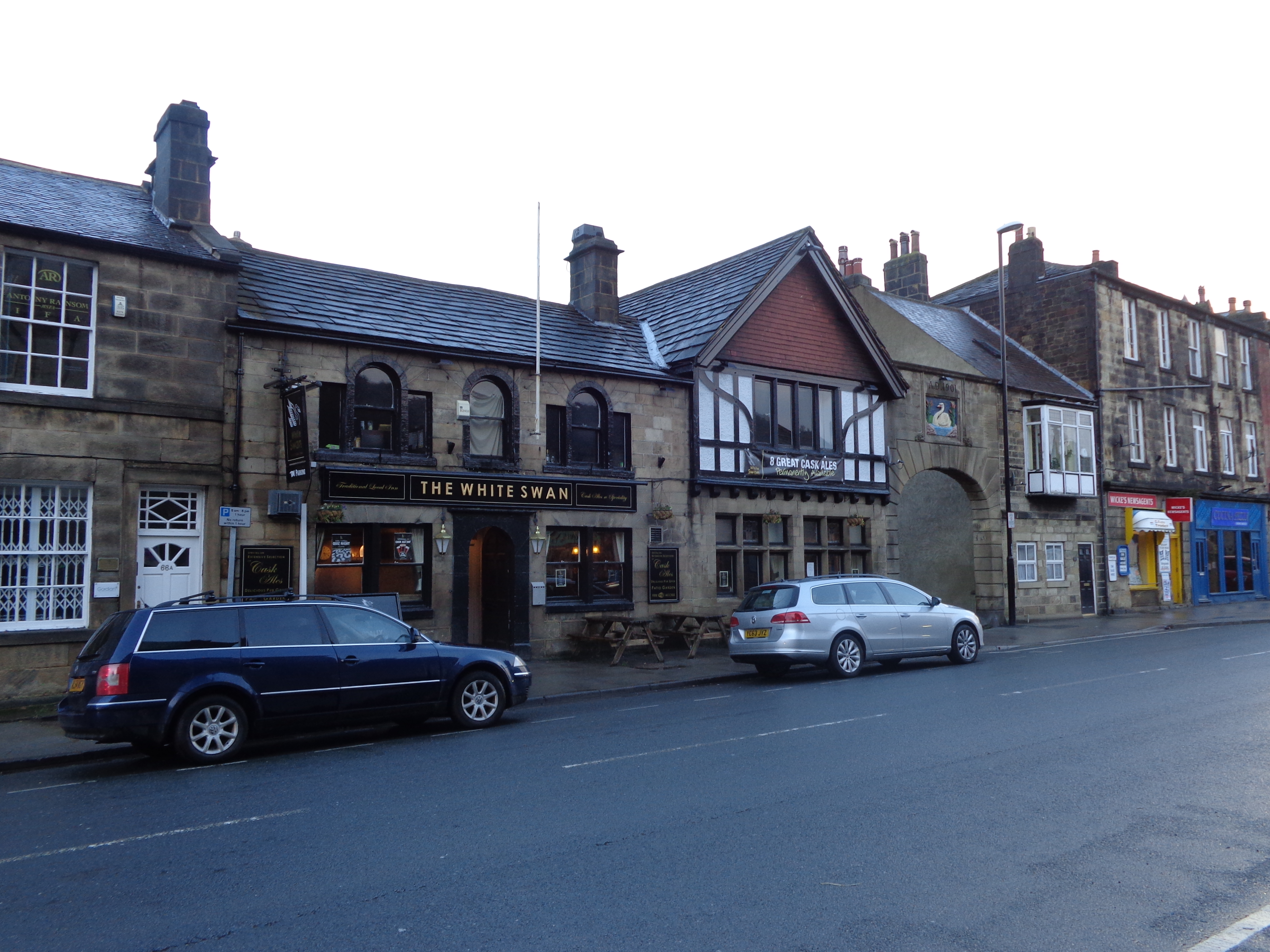
The White Swan

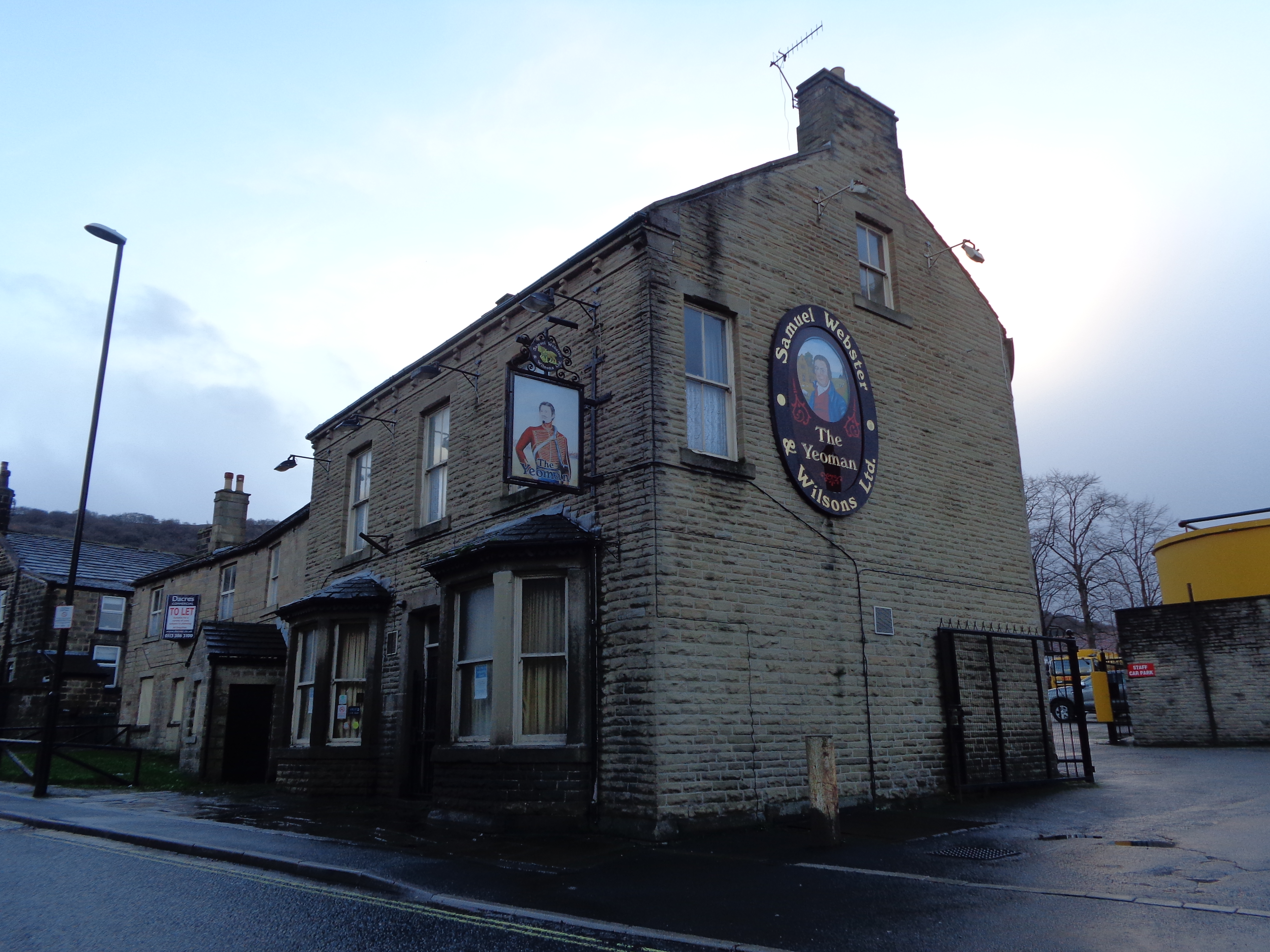
The Yeoman (formerly the Fountain)

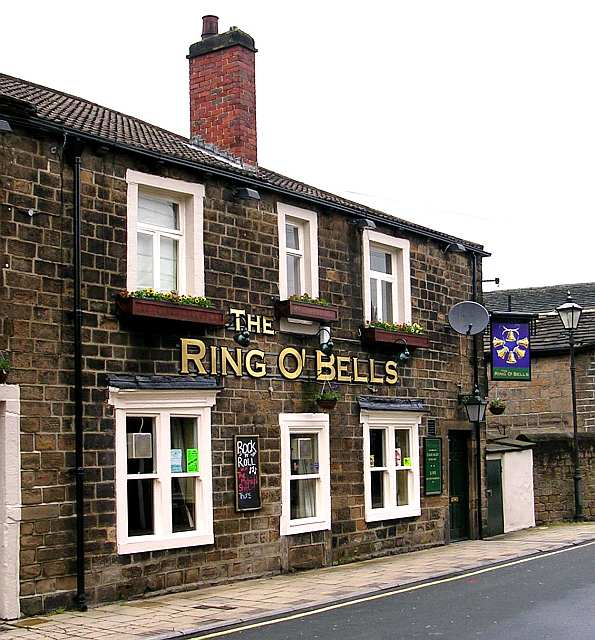
The Ring O'Bells (now the Otley Tavern)

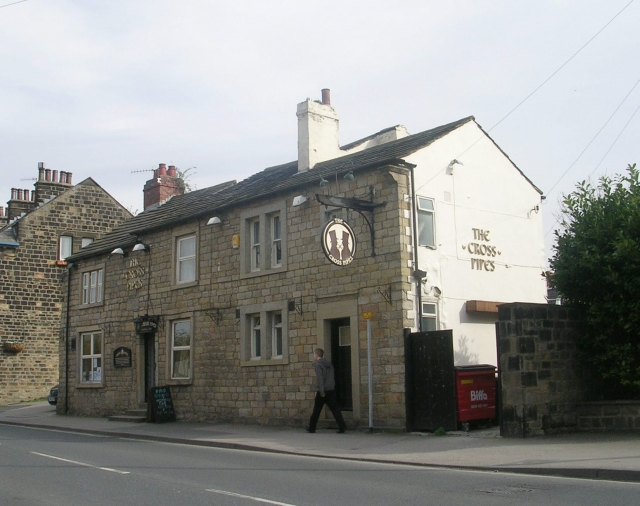
The Cross Pipes

== Filmography ==
Otley is "Hotton" in the ITV television soap opera Emmerdale, and appears in ITV's Heartbeat where Otley Courthouse is the old Police Station. ITV's DCI Banks also regularly filmed in the town. Otley was also the setting for the drama series The Chase and the ITV dramatisation of The Bad Mother's Handbook.

The 1970 film Wuthering Heights was also filmed in the area in Blubberhouses, Weston Hall near Otley, and Brimham Rocks.

== Local media ==
Local news and television programmes are provided by BBC Yorkshire and ITV Yorkshire. Television signals are received from the local relay transmitter.

Local radio stations are BBC Radio Leeds on 95.3 FM, Greatest Hits Radio Harrogate & The Yorkshire Dales on 107.1 FM, Capital Yorkshire on 105.6 FM, Heart Yorkshire on 107.6 FM, Drystone Radio on 102 FM and Rombalds Radio, a community based radio station that broadcast online.

The local newspaper is the Wharfedale Observer.

== Sport ==
Otley Angling Club was formed in 1897 by local land owners. It controls the fishing on the River Wharfe through Otley and a coarse fishing pond on the outskirts of the town. It runs regular fishing matches on the river and junior matches on the club pond.

Otley Athletic Club meets at Otley Cricket Club.

Otley Cricket Club, founded in 1820, play in the Airedale and Wharfedale Senior Cricket League. The club has won the league title 13 times and shared it in 1966. The club has three Senior teams and provides facilities for Juniors from Under 9 to Under 17. The Club play at Cross Green.

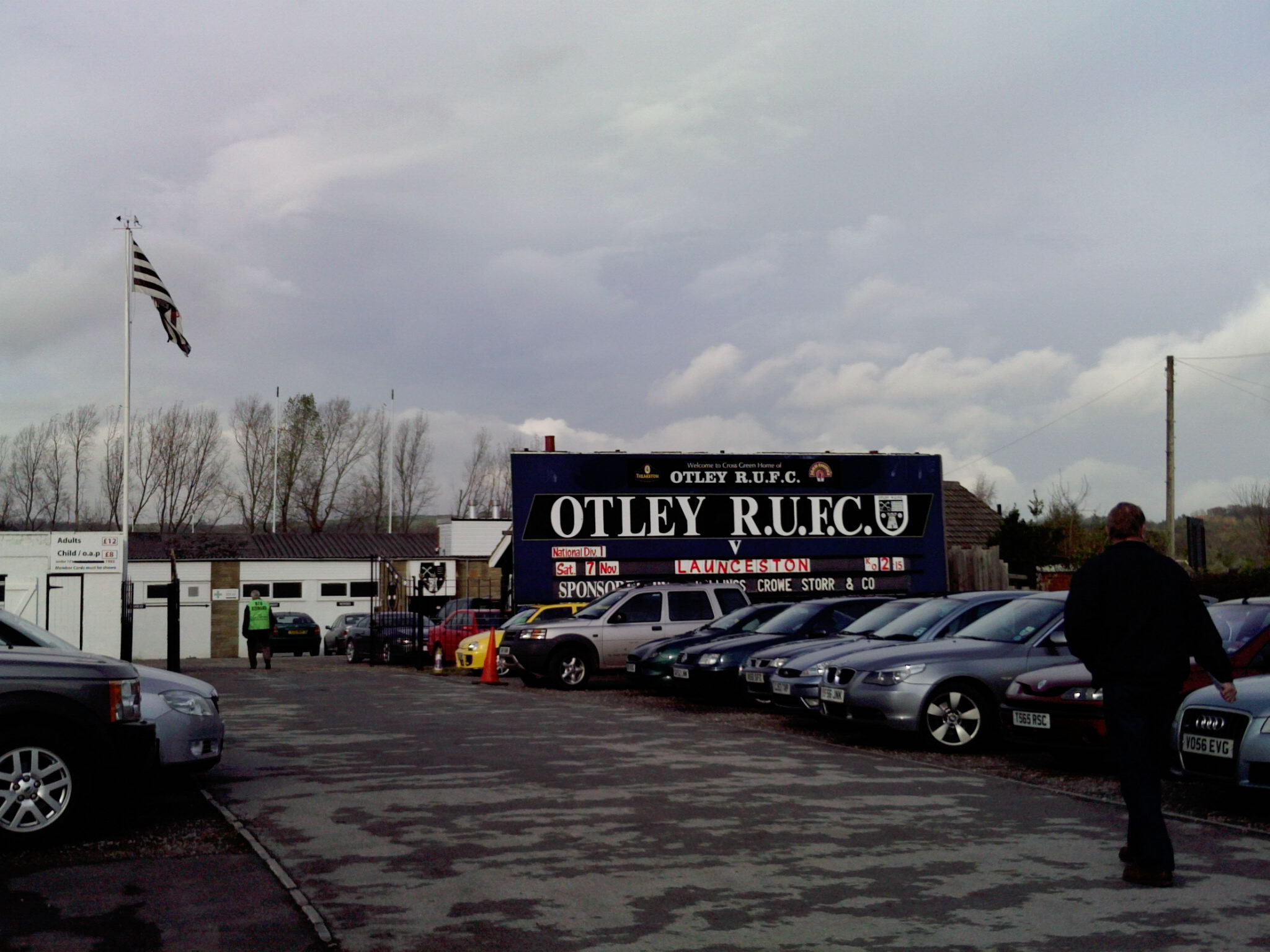
Cross Green rugby ground, the home ground of Otley R.U.F.C.

Otley R.U.F.C. play home matches at Cross Green, which was the venue for the Italy v USA fixture in the 1991 Rugby World Cup. In 1979 Cross Green was the site of a victory by the North of England against the All Blacks. Otley R.U.F.C. finished 5th in National Division One in both the 2003–04 and 2004–05 seasons but were relegated to National Division Two at the end of the 2006–07 season. The club won National Division Two in 2007–08 and returned to National Division One for the 2008–09 season.

Otley Town Football Club has teams in the Premier division of the West Yorkshire League, the Premier division of the Harrogate & District League and the reserves division of the West Yorkshire League. It runs junior teams including two girls' teams. The club is a Charter Standard football club run by volunteers. The Sunday League team, Otley Wharfeside AFC, play in the Wharfedale Triangle Football League.

Otley Cycle Club was founded on 27 January 1927. Its patron is Lizzie Armitstead, an international champion cyclist who was born in the town. It meets regularly and hosts a number of races throughout the year.

On 5 July 2014, the Tour de France Stage 1 from Leeds to Harrogate passed through the town. On 3 May 2015, the final stage of the first Tour de Yorkshire came through the outskirts of Otley. On 30 April 2016, Otley was the start of the second stage of the Tour de Yorkshire.

== Notable people ==
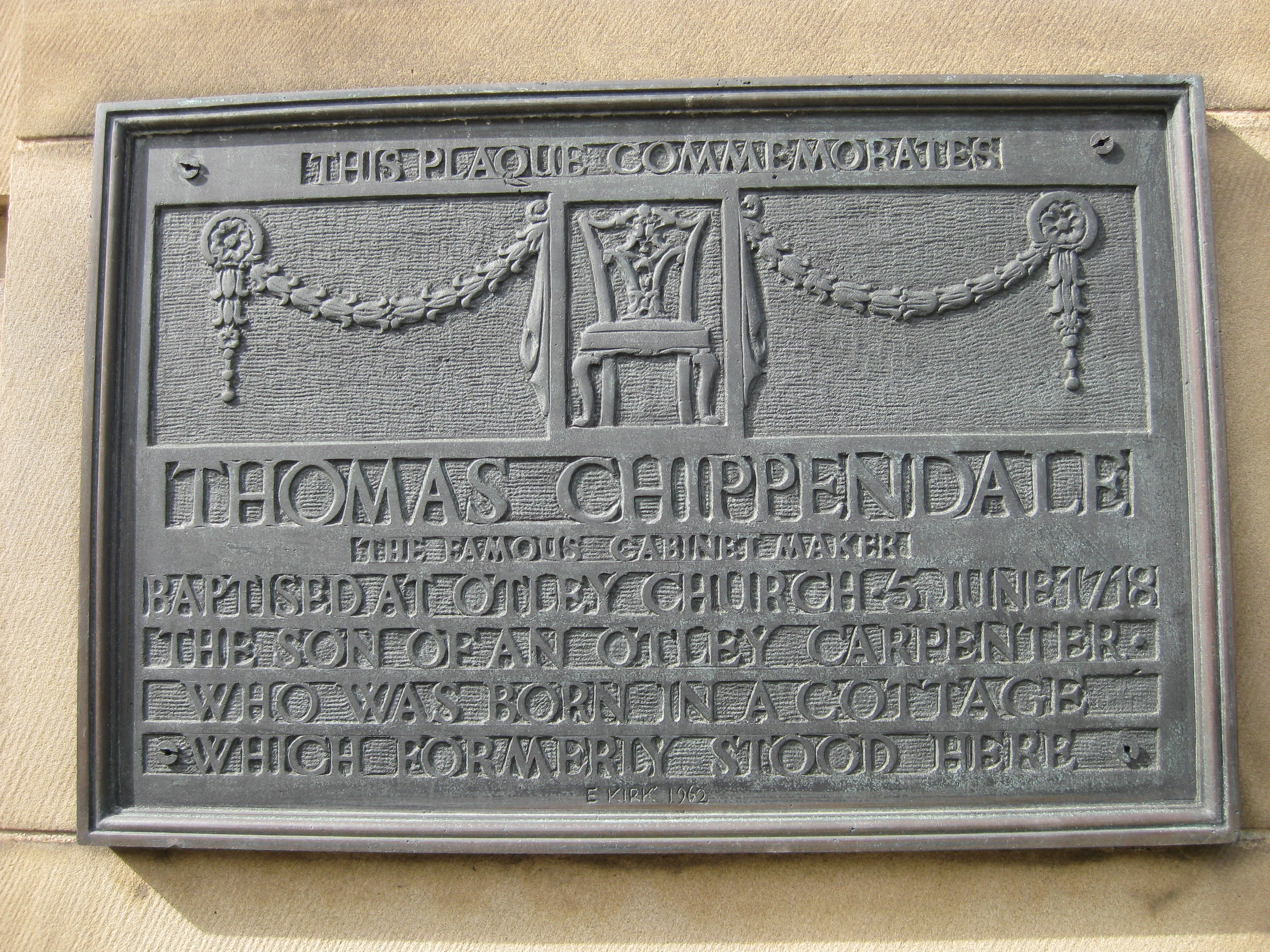
Thomas Chippendale was born in a cottage which formerly stood here

- Thomas Chippendale (1718–1779), English cabinetmaker, who was born in a cottage at the junction of Boroughgate and Wesley Street; his statue stands next to the old Grammar School that he once attended in Manor Square.
- J. M. W. Turner (1775–1851), English painter, who visited Otley in 1797, aged 22, when commissioned to paint watercolours of the area. He was so attracted to Otley and the surrounding area that he often returned. His friendship with Walter Ramsden Fawkes made him a regular visitor to Farnley Hall, two miles from Otley. The stormy backdrop of his 1812 Snow Storm: Hannibal and his Army Crossing the Alps is reputed to have been inspired by a storm over Otley's Chevin while Turner was staying at Farnley Hall.
- Elizabeth Garnett (23 September 1839 – 22 March 1921), missionary to navvies and author, who did much to improve the life of the navvies working in the area.
- Craig Adams, musician, member of The Sisters of Mercy, The Mission and The Cult
- Olivia Blake, current MP for Sheffield Hallam
- David Thomas Broughton, folk singer and guitarist
- Lizzie Deignan, British cyclist
- Nick Houghton, field marshall, former Chief of the Defence Staff
- Alan Kernaghan, Republic of Ireland footballer
- Joseph Ritchie, surgeon, African explorer, and naturalist
- Julian Sands, British actor
- Mike Tindall, England rugby union captain
- The Chevin, alternative rock band
- Coyle Girelli, composer and recording artist
- Aidan White, professional footballer
- Dora Metcalf, entrepreneur, mathematician and engineer
- Lucy Chambers, actress

== See also ==
- Listed buildings in Otley
