= Wharfedale Greenway =

Proposed trail in West Yorkshire, England

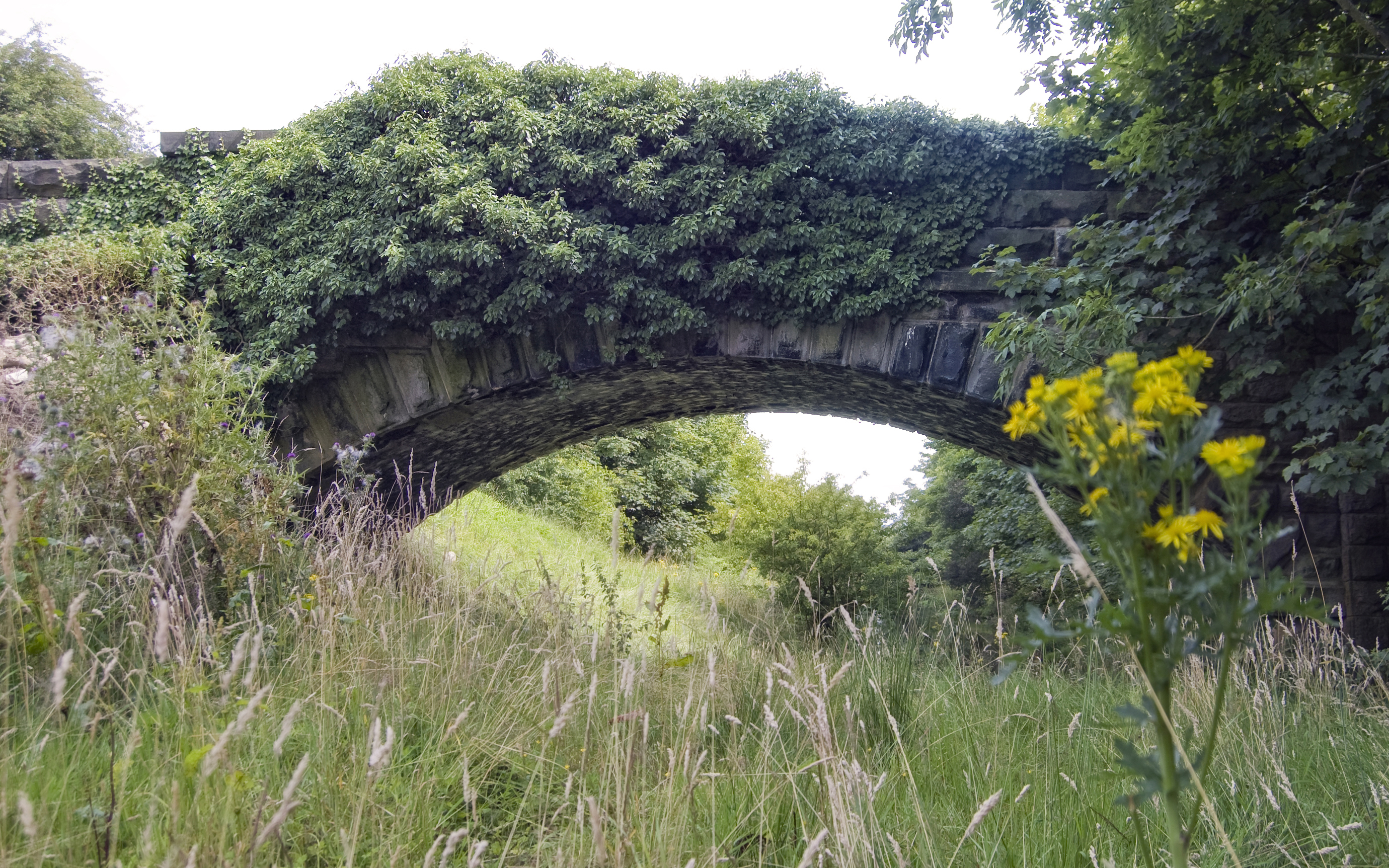
- Bridge over the abandoned railway cutting in Otley, to become part of the greenway
- Length: 6.7 mi (10.8 km)
- Location: Wharfedale, West Yorkshire, England
- Established: 2020
- Trailheads: Addingham (west) to Pool in Wharfedale (east)
- Use: Cycling, pedestrians, horses

Trail map
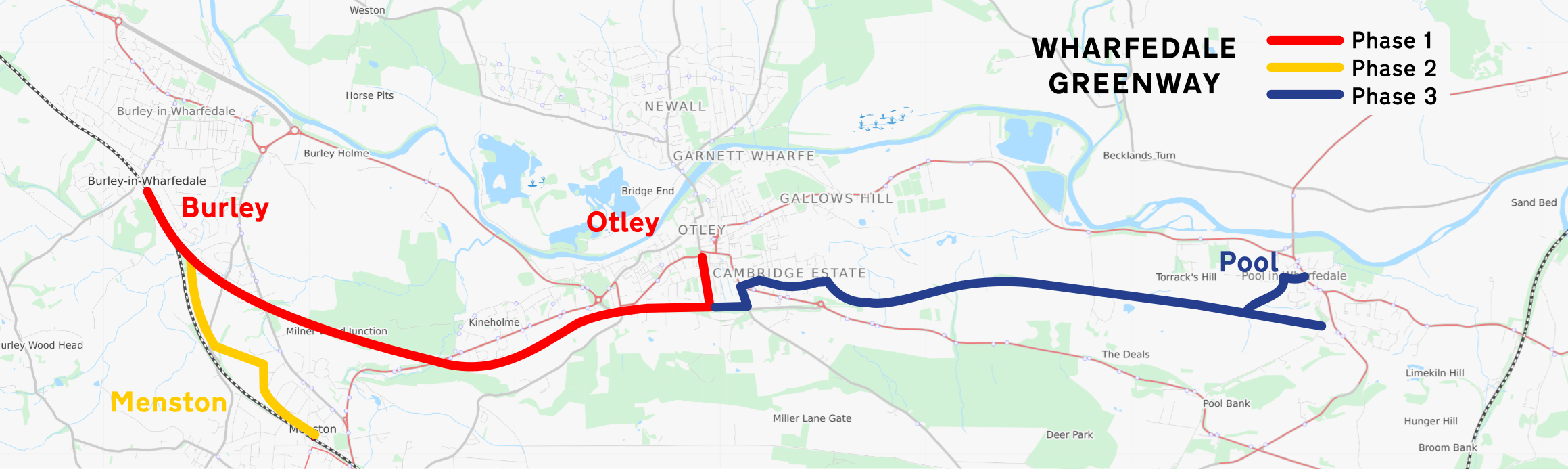

The Wharfedale Greenway is a proposed cycleway, footpath and equestrian route which will run along the route of the former Otley and Ilkley Joint Railway between Burley in Wharfedale and Pool in Wharfedale via Otley, West Yorkshire, England. The railway previously connected the extant Wharfedale and Harrogate lines until its closure in 1965. It will also have a branch southwards towards Menston alongside the remaining railway to Ilkley. The rail trail has been planned by Sustrans and the parish councils along the route since 2010 and was approved by Leeds City Council in July 2020. The Friends of Wharfedale Greenway was established in 2021. It is a group of volunteers dedicated to raising awareness and support for the creation of a greenway along the Wharfe Valley. Its mission is to connect communities, promote sustainable transportation, and preserve the natural beauty of the area.

== History ==
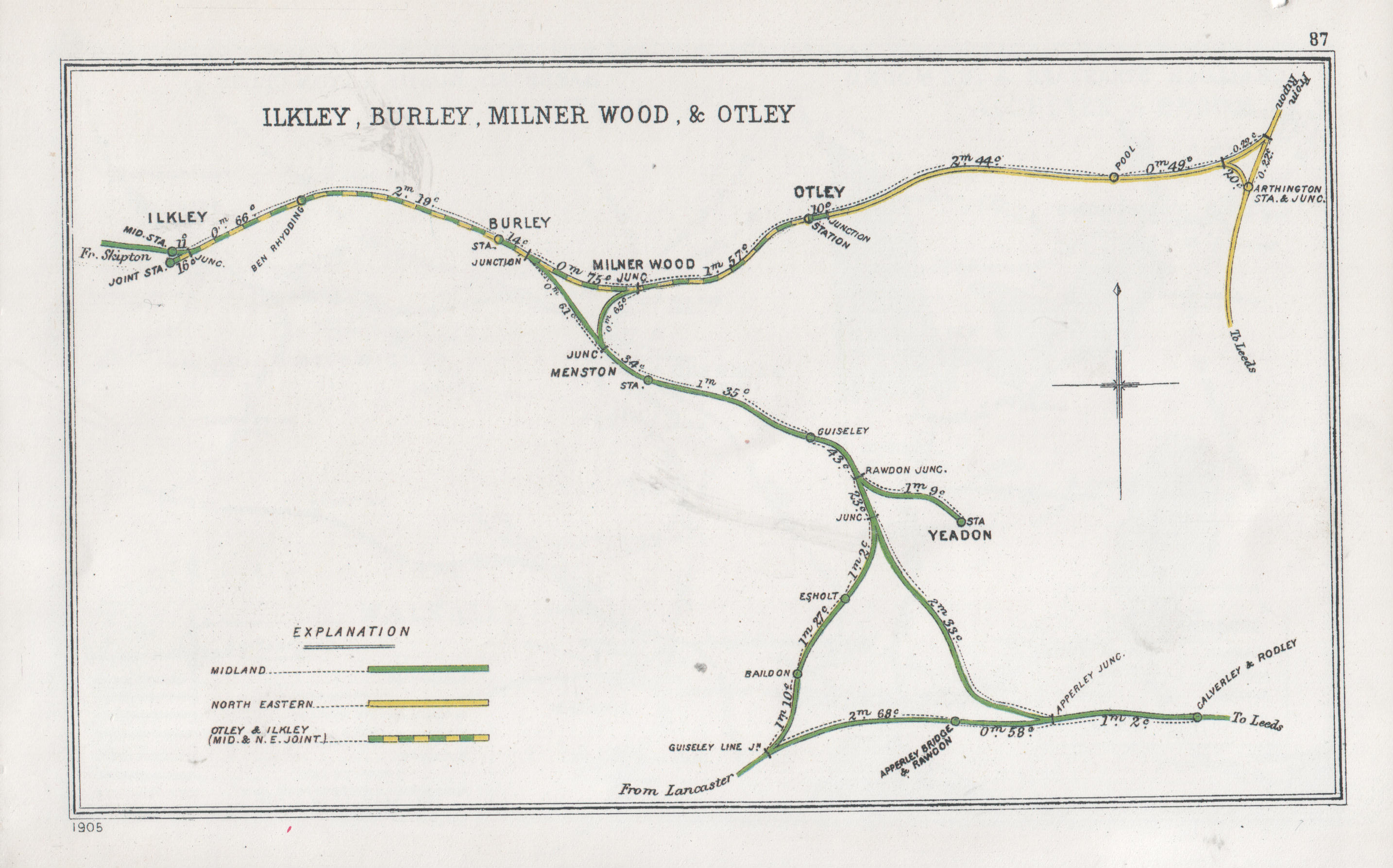
A pre-grouping railway junction diagram around Ilkley, Burley, Milner Wood & Otley

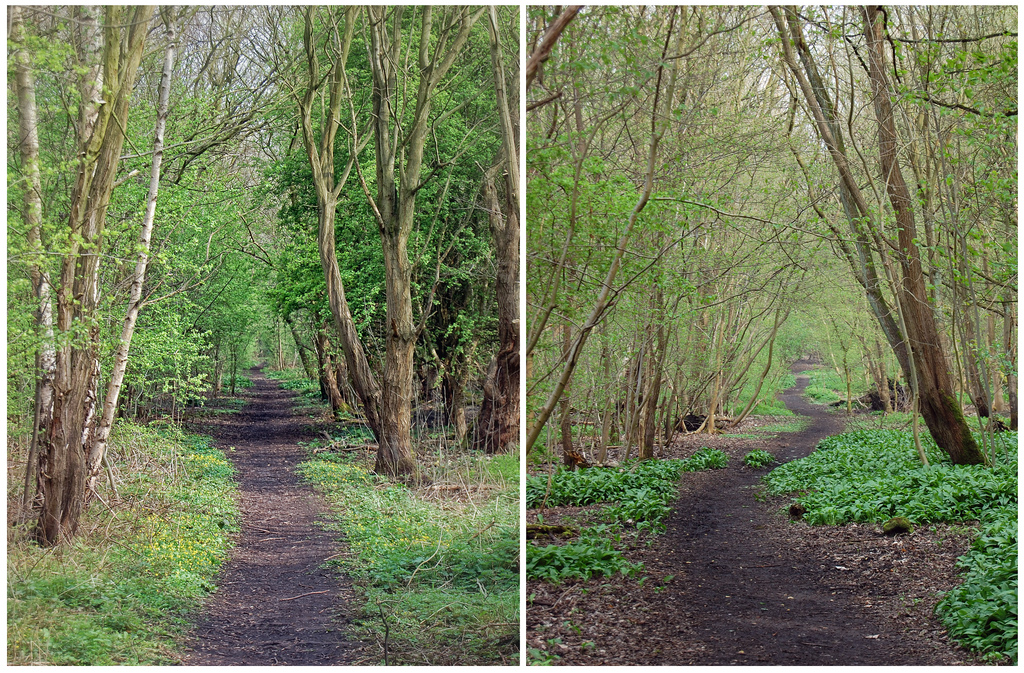
A footpath lined with trees marks the former railway route to the west of Otley, between what were the old Milnerwood and Burley Junctions

The 6 1/2-mile (10 km) Otley and Ilkley Joint Railway was opened to passenger traffic on 1 August 1865, and ran for almost 100 years before partial closure in July 1965 when the line to Otley closed. Today passenger Leeds to Ilkley Wharfedale line services still run over the rest of the line. The track was lifted in 1966, and though the closed route forms an unsurfaced footpath along some sections, much of the eastern part between Otley and Pool is publicly inaccessible private farmland.

A feasibility study for a cycleway was prepared by Sustrans in 2010 for Otley Town Council. However, substantial cuts in public funding coincided with the 2010 report, leaving Leeds City Council unable to take the proposals forward while still completing work on urban sections of the city's cycle network. Renewed interest was stimulated in 2013 by the announcement that the Grand Départ of the 2014 Tour de France would take place in Leeds city centre. A steering group consisting of Otley Town Council, Burley, Pool, and Menston parish councils, Leeds and Bradford City Councils, and Sustrans was established to create a safe walking and cycling route linking the parishes. The 2010 report's recommendation to put forward the old railway corridor, to be named the Wharfedale Greenway, was then adopted.

A subsequent consultation exercise then demonstrated sizable local support (94%) for the project. In March 2017, Sustrans completed a Design and Delivery Report for the first phase between Burley and Otley, to create a robust case for securing funding opportunities. To maintain momentum, in June 2017 Sustrans were commissioned to carry out a Design and Cost report for the second phase of the Greenway between Otley and Pool.

Otley Town Council submitted an application for full planning permission for change of use of disused railway to form a traffic-free path including construction of a bridge over Bradford Road, in February 2020, relating to the first phase between Burley and Otley. The local planning authority, Leeds City Council, considered that the greenway was "expected to be a very valuable asset to the local communities" and "would help tackle severance problems by providing cycling and pedestrian access between the settlements on the route which is currently severed by major roads such as the A660, A65 and A6038." The application was approved in July 2020, allowing construction to begin of a 3 m (9.8 ft) wide tarmac footway alongside a 2 m (6.6 ft) equestrian track.

Further phases envisaged include:

- Phase 2: Otley to Pool
- Phase 3: Link with Menston
- Phase 4: Burley to Ilkley and Addingham link and onwards to Bolton Bridge
