= Otley Museum =

Local museum in Otley, West Yorkshire, England

Coordinates: 53.9061°N 1.6895°W

Otley Museum is in the town of Otley, near Leeds in West Yorkshire, England. Founded in 1961, it holds a collection of objects, artefacts and documentary material relating to the development of Otley and the surrounding District since the prehistoric period.

== Collections ==
The museum's collections include prehistoric stone tools and artefacts, with the archaeological collection originating from the excavations of the Palace of the Archbishop of York at Otley. In addition to this the museum houses the Otley Printers' Engineers Collection, the Urban Development Archive, and an archive representing the Social History of Otley from the 18th Century onwards. The Otley Museum is independent, and managed and run entirely by volunteers.

Until early 2010, two rooms in the Otley Civic Centre housed the museum's eclectic collection of objects depicting the history of Otley and its surrounding District from prehistoric times through Anglo Saxon and Viking era, into the medieval period, and documenting its development from a rural community to a Victorian industrial town, and into the 20th century. When the museum had to vacate those rooms, these artefacts were placed in secure storage at Wellcroft House.

In 2024, while still without a permanent physical home, the museum publicised its new website which will serve as a showcase for photographs of some of the approximately 1900 artefacts that have been curated by volunteers.
