= Otley Civic Centre =

Municipal building in Otley, West Yorkshire, England

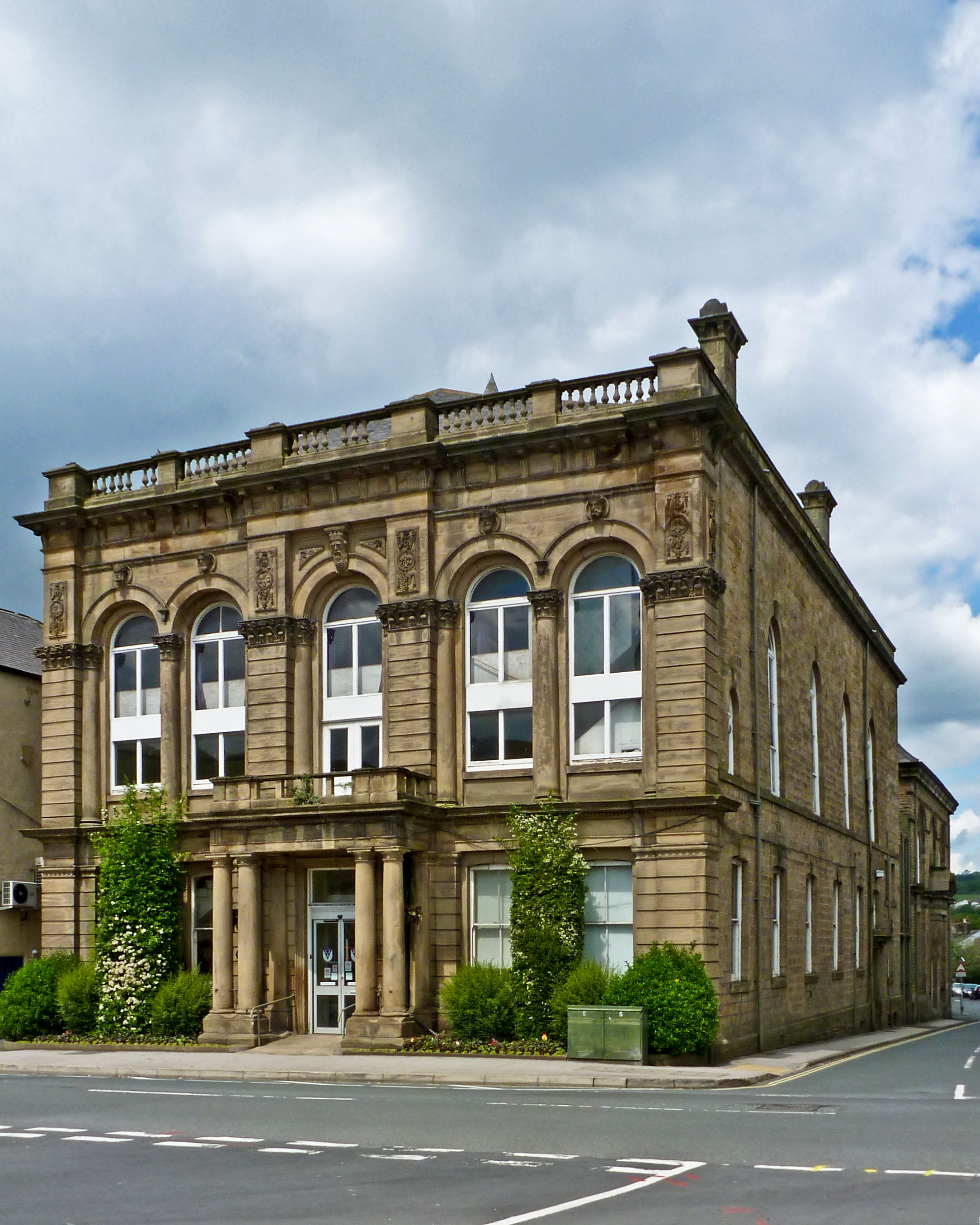
- Otley Civic Centre

- Shown in West Yorkshire
- 53.9061°N 1.6895°W
- Location: Cross Green, Otley

History
- Built: 1871

Site notes
- Architect: Charles Fowler
- Architectural style: Italianate style

Listed Building – Grade II
- Official name: The Mechanics Institute
- Designated: 8 July 1974
- Reference no.: 1200204

Otley Civic Centre is a municipal structure in Cross Green, Otley, West Yorkshire, England. The structure, which was the offices and meeting place of Otley Town Council, is a Grade II listed building.

== History ==
The building was commissioned by members of the local mechanics institute which had been formed as the Otley Useful Instruction Society in 1835. Its members, who included the magistrate, John Peele Clapham, initially met in a school room attached to the Salem Chapel in Bridge Street before moving to the Wesleyan Chapel in Nelson Street the following year. In the 1860s the members decided to erect a dedicated building for the mechanics institute to promote adult education in the town.

The foundation stone for new building was laid by a local philanthropist, Mrs Emma Dawson, of Weston Hall on 19 June 1868. It was designed by Charles Fowler of Leeds in the Italianate style, built in ashlar stone and was officially opened on 31 October 1871. The design involved a symmetrical main frontage with five bays facing onto Cross Green; the central bay, which slightly projected forward, featured, on the ground floor, a portico with two pairs of Tuscan order columns supporting an entablature and, on the first floor, a stone balcony and a French door flanked by Corinthian order pilasters. The other bays were fenestrated by sash windows on the ground floor and round headed windows on the first floor. At roof level, there was an entablature, a cornice supported by brackets and a balustrade. Internally, the principal rooms were the concert hall on the first floor and the lecture theatre on the ground floor. The building became the main forum for public events in the town with lectures, theatrical performances and concerts all being held there.

Following significant population growth, largely associated with the status of Otley as a market town, the area became an urban district in 1894. Although, the mechanics institute was extended to the rear in 1895, the council established offices for council officers and their departments in North Parade. The council eventually took ownership of the former mechanics institute, which it received as a gift for the benefit of the community, in 1957.

The Otley Museum, which was established in 1961 with the objective of assembling a collection of objects depicting the history of the town, subsequently moved into the building. Following local government re-organisation in 1974, the building was transferred to the ownership of Leeds City Council and the building subsequently became the offices and meeting place of Otley Town Council which was formed in the mid-1970s. After the city council decided to redevelop the building, the town council was asked to relocate and the museum had to close in December 2010. The city council went on to sell the building to a developer in December 2020.
