= Connexionsbuses =

Bus Operator in Yorkshire, England

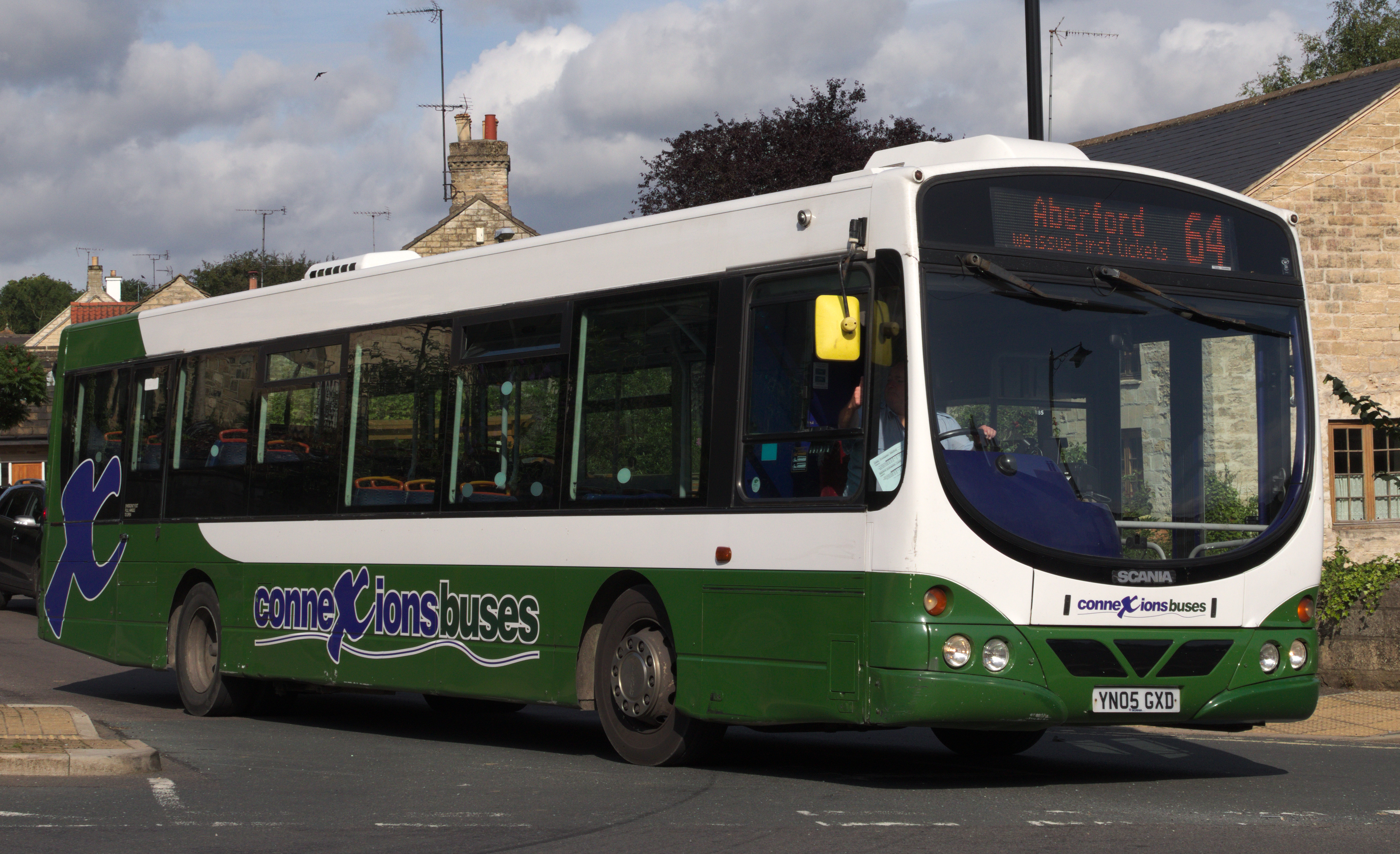
- Founded: February 2002; 24 years ago
- Headquarters: Tockwith, North Yorkshire; England
- Service area: North Yorkshire; West Yorkshire
- Service type: Bus and coach
- Fleet: 39 (at February 2016)
- Managing Director: Craig Temple
- Website: www.connexionsbuses.com

Harrogate Coach Travel (Note: Since March 2011, the company has traded under the name Connexionsbuses.) trading as Connexionsbuses is a bus operator which operates local and regional bus services in North Yorkshire and West Yorkshire, England.

== History ==
Harrogate Coach Travel was established in February 2002 by Craig and Julie Temple. Initially, the company operated local bus services between York and Ripon via Green Hammerton. The company later expanded, operating tendered services for both North Yorkshire County Council and West Yorkshire Metro.

In August 2010, the company expanded with the introduction of local services in and around the towns of Ilkley and Otley, which were transferred from First West Yorkshire and TLC Travel.

In March 2011, the company was rebranded as Connexionsbuses.

In April 2011, the X70 service was launched between Harrogate and Wetherby. At the same time, the company gained the contract for several local services in Harrogate from North Yorkshire County Council. The service between York and Ripon was lost, with a jointly-operated service commencing between York to Ripon and Wetherby, in partnership with Eddie Brown Tours.

In 2013, the company took over operation of service 780 between Knaresborough and Wetherby, as well as service 923 between Otley and Tadcaster.

In April 2014, local services 104, 110, 111 and 112 in Harrogate were replaced by services X4, X6, X6A and X12.

Following the collapse of Eddie Brown Tours in December 2014, the company took over temporary operation of services 142 and 143 between York and Harrogate via Ripon – a short-term arrangement lasting until 5 January 2015. Following this, the services were taken over by Transdev York. The company also took over short-term operation of services 56/56A and 57/57A between Harrogate and Ripon or Roecliffe, which was later transferred to The Harrogate Bus Company.

In June 2016, the company took over operation of service 38 between Moortown and White Rose Centre on a commercial basis, after Yorkshire Tiger withdrew the service. The service was withdrawn in September 2018 following competition from independent operator, SquarePeg Buses, as well as the expected implementation of a low-emission zone in Leeds.

In October 2018, the company commenced operation of route 64, which runs between Aberford and Leeds via Cross Gates, under contract to First Leeds. As of January 2022, the service operates half-hourly on weekdays and Saturday, with First Leeds operating an hourly service during the evening and on Sunday.

In November 2018, the company withdrew their operation in the cathedral city of Ripon, owing to the level of reimbursement for concessionary passes paid by North Yorkshire County Council. The company had operated local services in the city since September 2017, following the cessation of Shaun's Travel.

== Fleet ==
=== Depots ===
As of May 2022, the company operates from a single depot in Tockwith.

=== Vehicles ===
As of June 2022, the fleet consists of 40 buses. The fleet consists mainly of diesel-powered single manufactured by Optare and Scania and double-deck buses (Mostly second hand) manufactured by Scania.

== Wetherby Bus War ==
In 2011, the company became involved in a bus war with Transdev Harrogate & District. (Note: Transdev Harrogate & District has since been rebranded as The Harrogate Bus Company.) It concerned bus services operating in and around the market town of Wetherby.

== Preservation ==
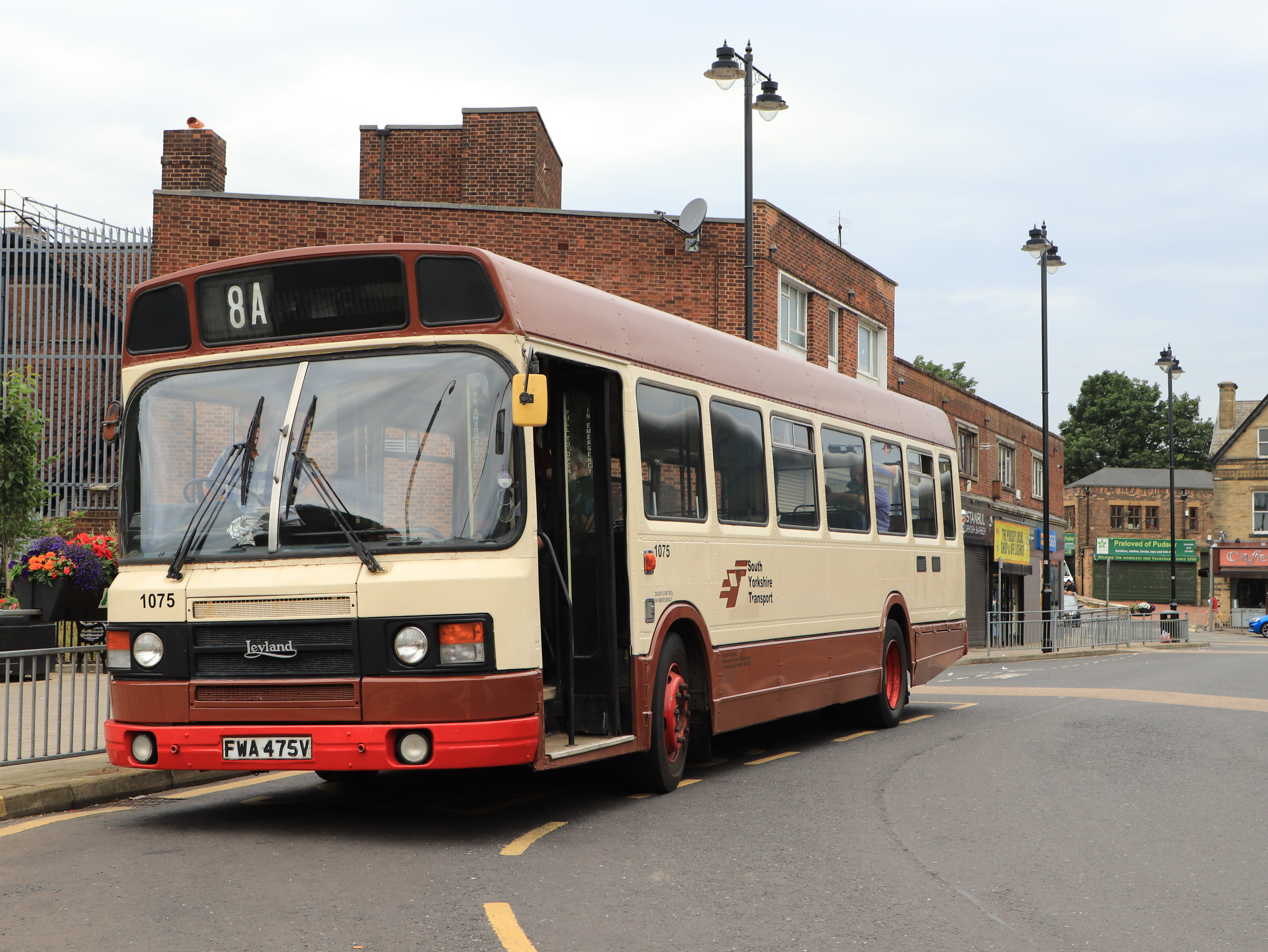
A Leyland National in the former South Yorkshire Transport livery

Alongside service buses, the company also maintain a fleet of preserved heritage vehicles. As of October 2019, this consisted of a fleet of nine vehicles manufactured between 1971 and 1999 – most of which originally operated in and around Yorkshire.
