= Burley-in-Wharfedale railway station =

Railway station in West Yorkshire, England

Burley-in-Wharfedale
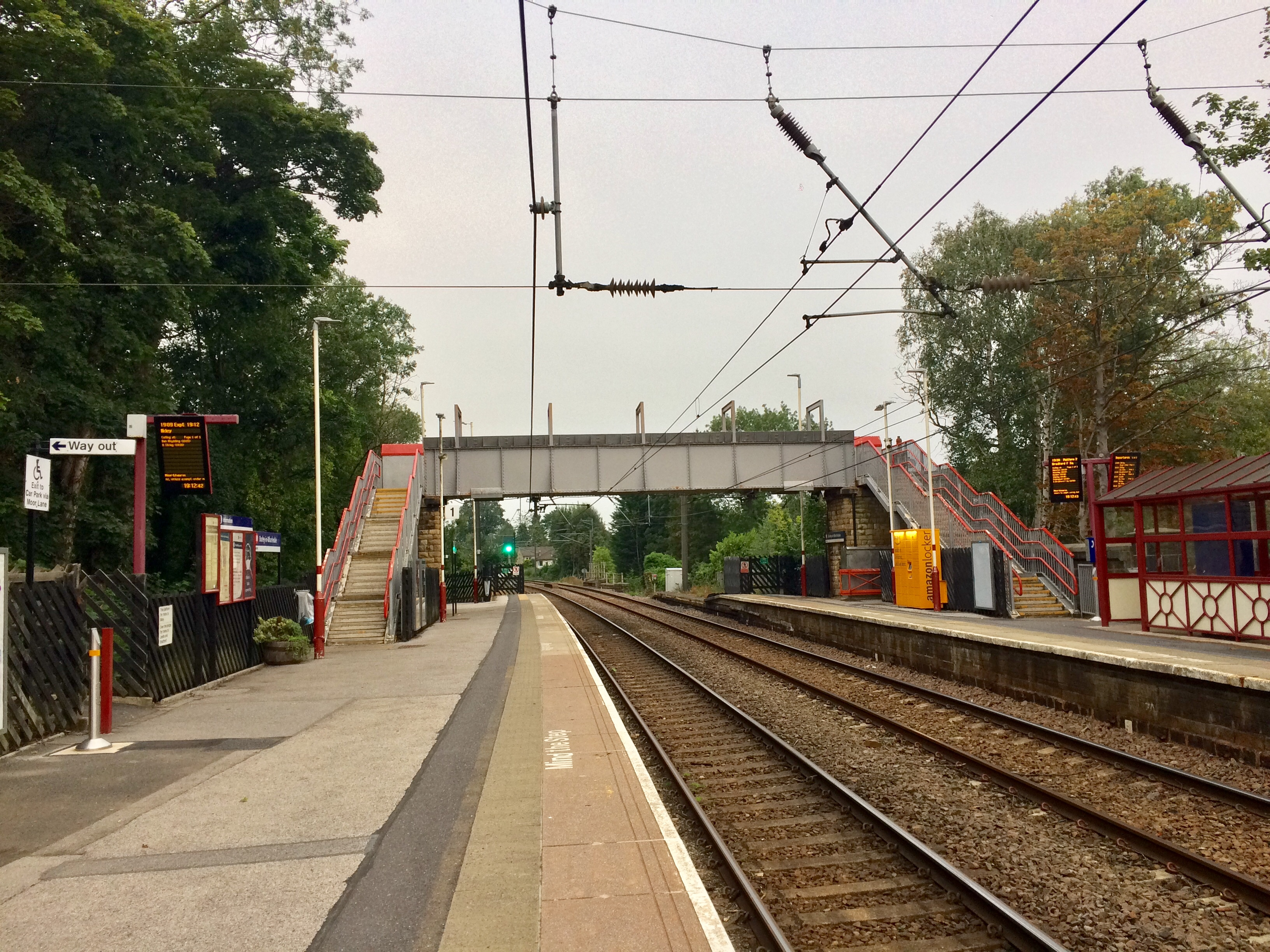
- A view looking along the line towards Ilkley

General information
- Location: Burley in Wharfedale, City of Bradford; England
- Coordinates: 53.9082°N 1.7535°W
- Grid reference: SE162458
- Manager: Northern Trains
- Transit authority: West Yorkshire (Metro)
- Platforms: 2

Other information
- Station code: BUW
- Fare zone: 3
- Classification: DfT category F1

History
- Opened: 1865

Passengers
- 2021/22: ▲0.376 million
- 2022/23: ▲0.465 million
- 2023/24: ▲0.492 million
- 2024/25: ▲0.607 million
- 2025/26: ▲0.638 million
Location
Notes
- Passenger statistics from the Office of Rail and Road

Burley-in-Wharfedale railway station serves the village of Burley in Wharfedale in West Yorkshire, England, in the City of Bradford. The station lies on the Wharfedale Line between Ilkley and Leeds/Bradford Forster Square. It is served by Class 333 units run by Northern Trains, who also manage the station.

It was opened in 1865 and is located on the Otley and Ilkley Joint Railway (and thus run by both the Midland Railway and the North Eastern Railway), 3 1/4 miles (5.2 km) east of Ilkley. The station is unstaffed (and has been so since October 1968) and was once the junction for the line to Leeds via Otley. This route closed in 1965, as a result of the Beeching Axe. The station building still stands, but is now privately owned.

In February and March 2022, tactile paving was installed along both platform edges.

There are plans for the platforms to be extended to allow for 6 carriage trains.

== Facilities ==
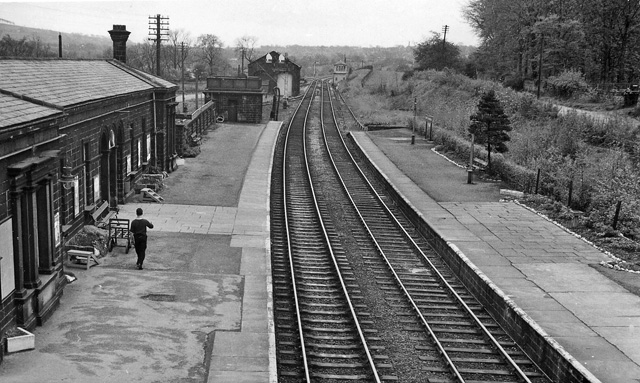
View SE, towards Guiseley and Leeds in 1961

Though unstaffed (as noted), the station does have a self-service ticket machine in place to allow passengers to buy before boarding; this can also be used to collect advance purchase tickets. Waiting shelters are provided on both platforms, which are linked by footbridge (step-free access is however possible to both via nearby streets). Train running information is offered via customer information screens, automated announcements and timetable posters.

== Services ==
During Monday to Saturday daytimes services run to/from Leeds twice-hourly and hourly to Bradford Forster Square and there are three services every hour to Ilkley (an extra Bradford to Ilkley train each way per hour runs at peak time). During Monday to Saturday evenings and all day Sundays, services are hourly to/from both Leeds and Bradford Forster Square and there are two departures per hour to Ilkley.

Preceding station	National Rail	Following station
Menston	Northern Trains Wharfedale Line	Ben Rhydding
	Disused railways	
Otley	Otley and Ilkley Joint Railway	Ben Rhydding
