= Menston railway station =

Railway station in West Yorkshire, England

Menston
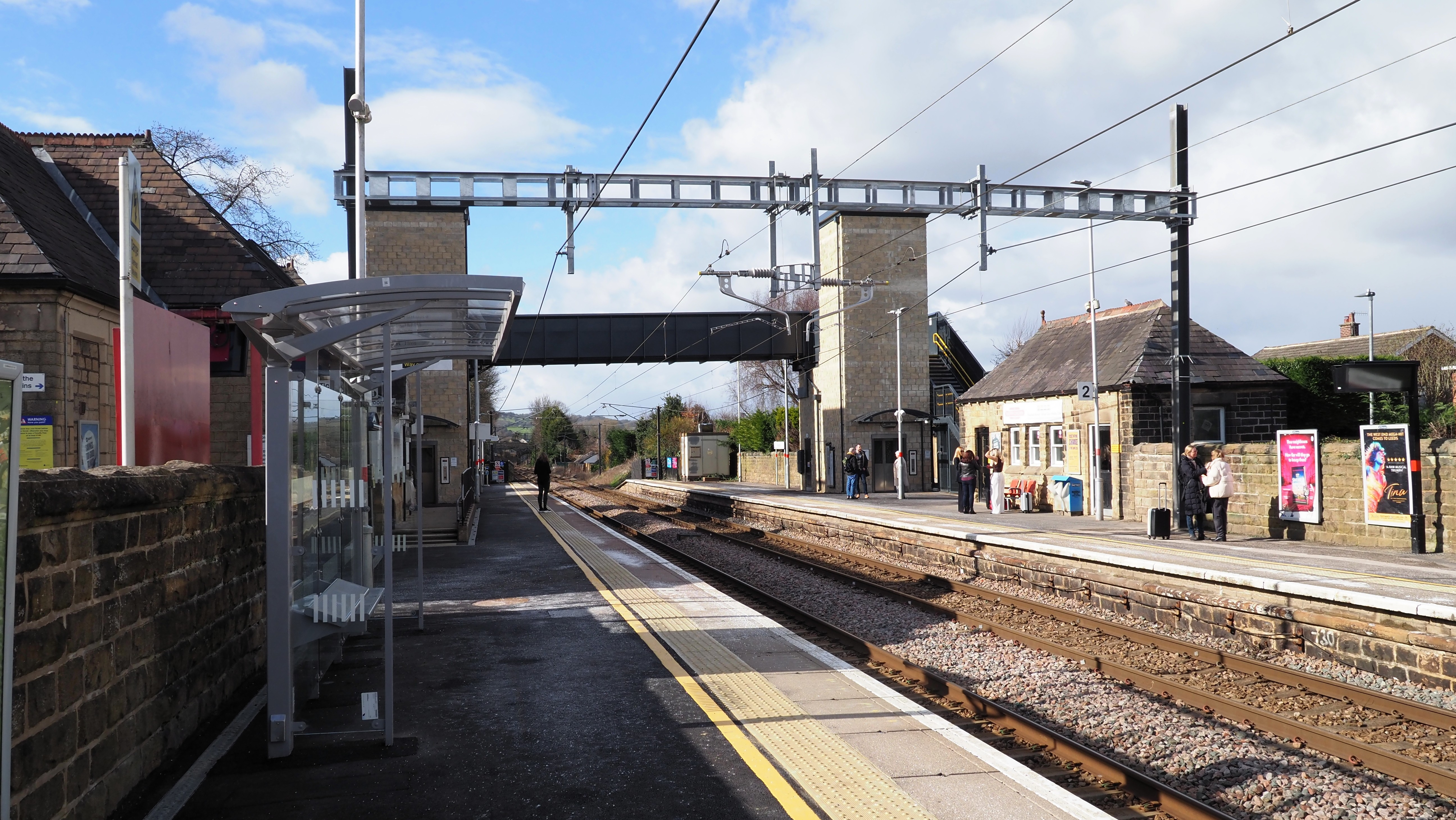
- Menston Station pictured in March 2026

General information
- Location: Menston, City of Bradford; England
- Coordinates: 53.8923°N 1.7356°W
- Grid reference: SE174440
- Manager: Northern Trains
- Transit authority: West Yorkshire (Metro)
- Platforms: 2

Other information
- Station code: MNN
- Fare zone: 3
- Classification: DfT category E

History
- Opened: 1873

Passengers
- 2021/22: ▲0.441 million
- 2022/23: ▲0.581 million
- 2023/24: ▲0.592 million
- 2024/25: ▲0.658 million
- 2025/26: ▲0.669 million
Location
Notes
- Passenger statistics from the Office of Rail and Road

Menston railway station serves Menston in the City of Bradford, West Yorkshire, England. On the Wharfedale Line between Ilkley and Leeds/Bradford Forster Square, it is served by Class 331 and 333 electric trains run by Northern Trains, who also manage the station.

The line was opened in August 1865 by the Midland Railway on their line from Apperley Junction to Burley-in-Wharfedale, from where trains could travel to either Ilkley or Otley via the Otley and Ilkley Joint Railway, however, Menston station did not open until April 1873. The route to Otley was closed in 1965, but the Ilkley line (though also listed for closure in the 1963 Beeching Report) avoided a similar fate, being finally reprieved in 1972. Electric services at the station commenced in 1994.

Between 1883 and 1951, High Royds Hospital, which stood to the west of the line, was served by a long private siding from just south of Menston station.

Menston station was redeveloped in 2000 as part of the general improvements to the Wharfedale Line by the West Yorkshire Passenger Transport Executive. The disused station building was brought back into use and a new ticket office was opened. The station now includes ticket machines where passengers can buy tickets and view services from Menston. Its current opening times are 06:15–18:00 Mon–Sat and 09:15–17:00 Sunday. A bus stop was added in the station forecourt.

A new footbridge and lifts were opened on 3 March 2026 to allow for step free access to both platforms. The project also included improved waiting facilities and CCTV upgrades. At the same time platform 1 was extended to allow for six-carriage trains in the future.

== Services ==
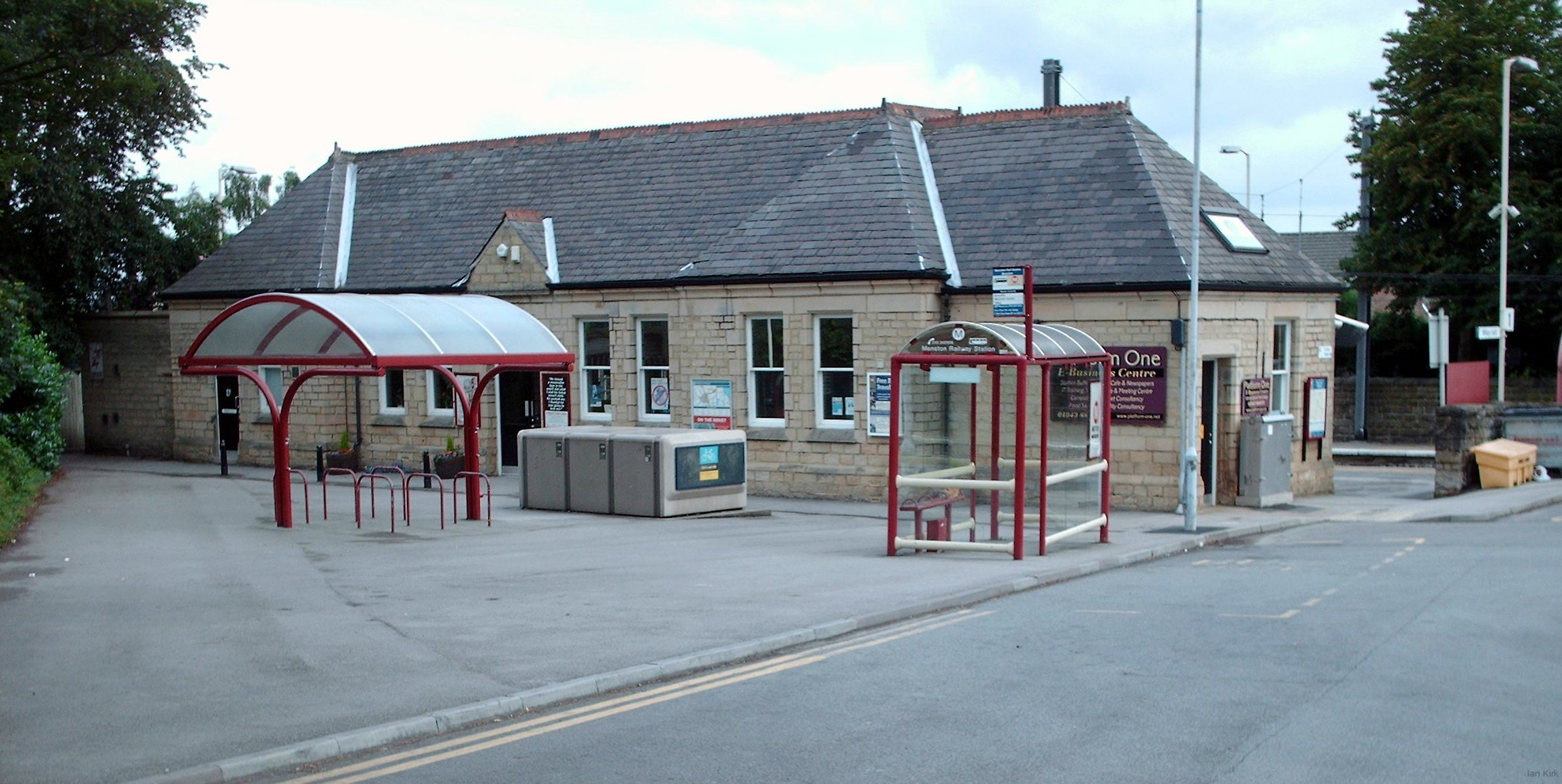
Menston station

During Monday to Saturday daytimes services run to/from Leeds twice per hour and once per hour to/from Bradford (increasing to half-hourly in the peaks), and there are three services every hour to Ilkley (four at peak times). During weekday evenings and all day Sundays, services are hourly to/from both Leeds and Bradford Forster Square and twice-hourly to Ilkley.

== Onward connections ==
The bus stop on the station forecourt is regularly served by Connexionsbuses 962 to Otley and Ilkley and their 963 to and from Otley & Garnett Wharfe.

TLC Travel operate the 635 between Pool, Otley, Shipley and Bradford once a day, both outward and return journeys serve the station forecourt.

First Leeds services 33/34 serve the station forecourt on evenings and Sundays but at other times only stop nearby on Cleasby Road.

== Bibliography ==
- Railways Through Airedale & Wharfedale. Martin Bairstow. 2004. ISBN 1-871944-28-7.

Preceding station	National Rail	Following station
Guiseley	Northern Trains Wharfedale Line	Burley-in-Wharfedale
