= Esholt railway station =

Disused railway station in West Yorkshire, England

Esholt
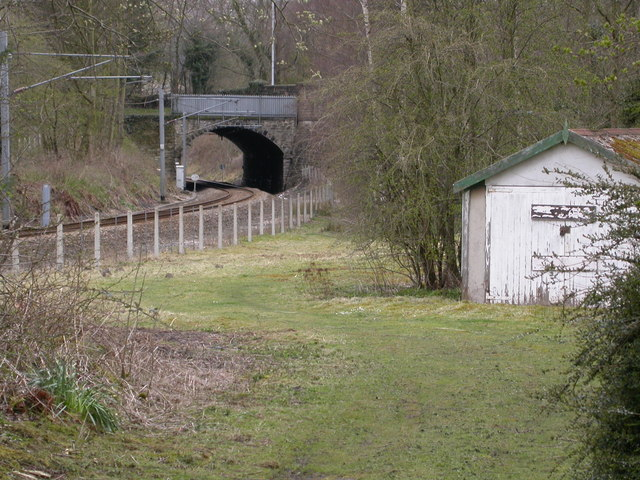
- View from Station Road but there is now no sign of the station, which closed in 1940.

General information
- Location: Esholt, City of Bradford; England
- Coordinates: 53.86076°N 1.73099°W
- Grid reference: SE177405

Other information
- Status: Disused

History
- Original company: Midland Railway
- Pre-grouping: Midland Railway
- Post-grouping: London, Midland and Scottish Railway

Key dates
- 4 December 1876: Opened
- 28 October 1940: Closed
Location

Esholt railway station was a railway station on the Shipley to Guiseley line of the Midland Railway. It opened on 4 December 1876 along with Baildon station when the line was formally opened, and closed on 28 October 1940. The buildings remained after closure before being demolished in 1953.

The station was listed for closure because it was losing £100 per year. A Bradford-based insurance broker, Mr Ben Ivinson, pulled the communication cord on a steam train from Bradford to Ilkley to try to get the train to halt in the station area. Mr Ivinson was protesting about the station's closure and the railway's response of there being a good enough bus service.

Preceding station	Historical railways	Following station
Baildon; Line and station open	Midland Railway; Wharfedale Line	Guiseley; Line and station open
