= Otley railway station =

Railway station in West Yorkshire, England

Otley
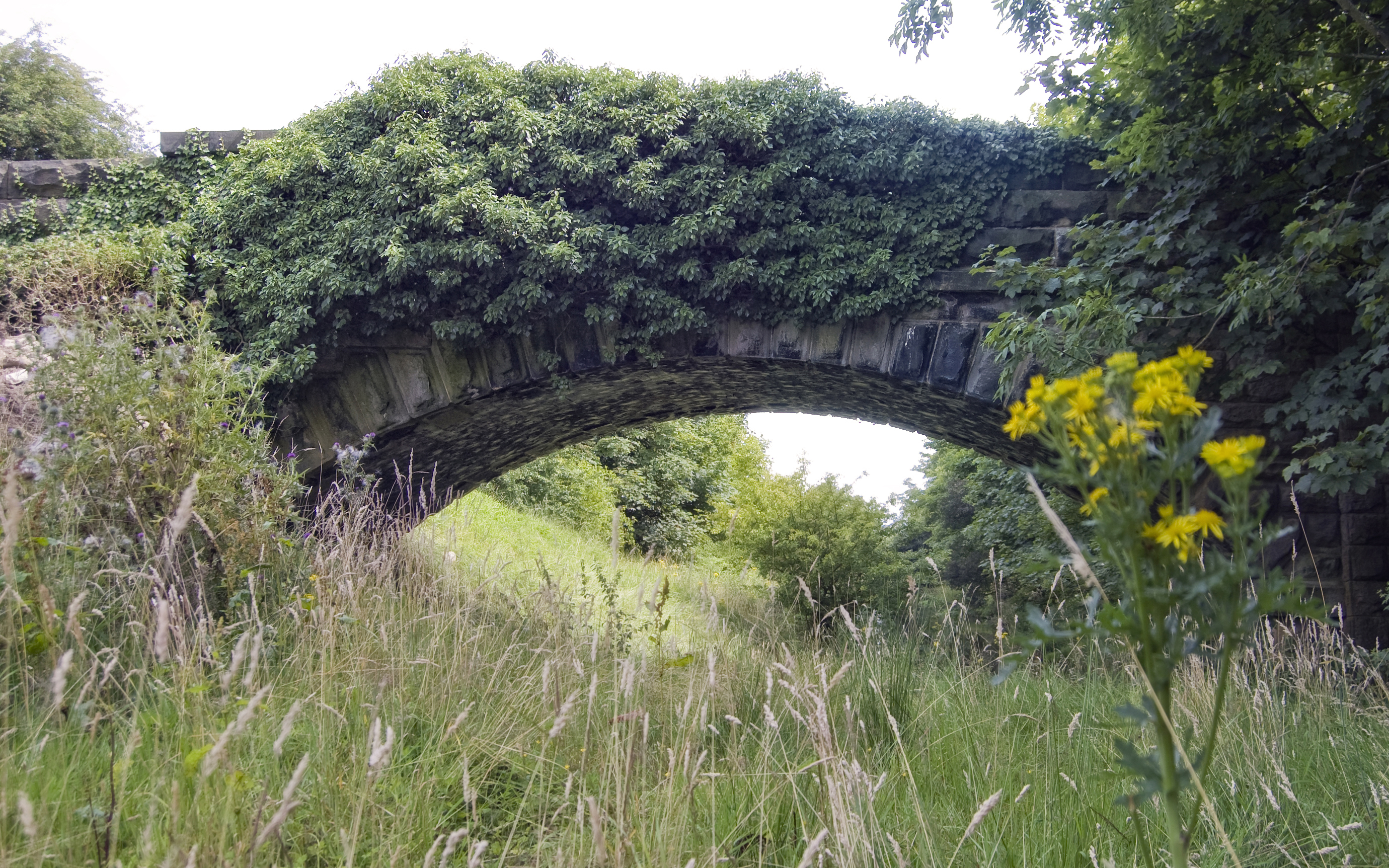
- An abandoned stone bridge spans the former track bed

General information
- Location: Otley, City of Leeds; England
- Coordinates: 53.90099°N 1.69138°W
- Grid reference: SE203450
- Platforms: 2

Other information
- Status: Disused

History
- Pre-grouping: North Eastern Railway and Midland Railway (joint)

Key dates
- 1865: Opened
- 1965: Closed
Location

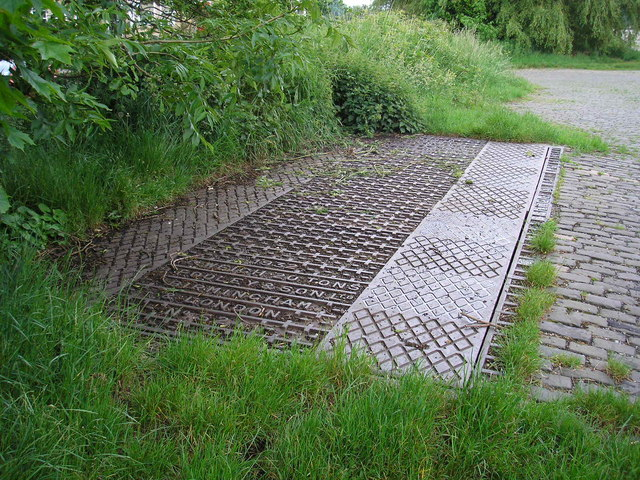
Abandoned weighbridge in the grounds of the former station, 2008

Otley railway station was a railway station serving the town of Otley in West Yorkshire, England.

== History ==
It was opened as a joint venture on the Otley and Ilkley Joint Railway, constructed by the North Eastern Railway and the Midland Railway, on 1 February 1865. The station was closed on 22 March 1965. Tracks and buildings have been removed since. The Otley branch line joined Arthington, in the east, to Ilkley and Menston in the west via a junction known as Milnerwood. The length of the line was about six miles (9.7 km) and spanned a range of terrain at the foot of The Chevin with a substantial cutting through a sandstone ridge near Milnerwood which can still be seen today by walking the footpath along the old track bed.

In January 2019, Campaign for Better Transport released a report identifying the line via Otley which was listed as Priority 2 for reopening. Priority 2 is for those lines which require further development or a change in circumstances (such as housing developments).

The trackbed between Burley in Wharfedale, Otley and Pool is to become a cycleway, footpath and equestrian route known as the Wharfedale Greenway, with possible extensions onward to Ilkley alongside the extant railway. Planning permission for the first phase of the greenway was granted in July 2020.

Preceding station	Disused railways	Following station
Pool-in-Wharfedale	Otley and Ilkley Joint Railway or Midland Railway	Burley-in-Wharfedale or Menston
