= Baildon railway station =

Railway station in West Yorkshire, England

Baildon
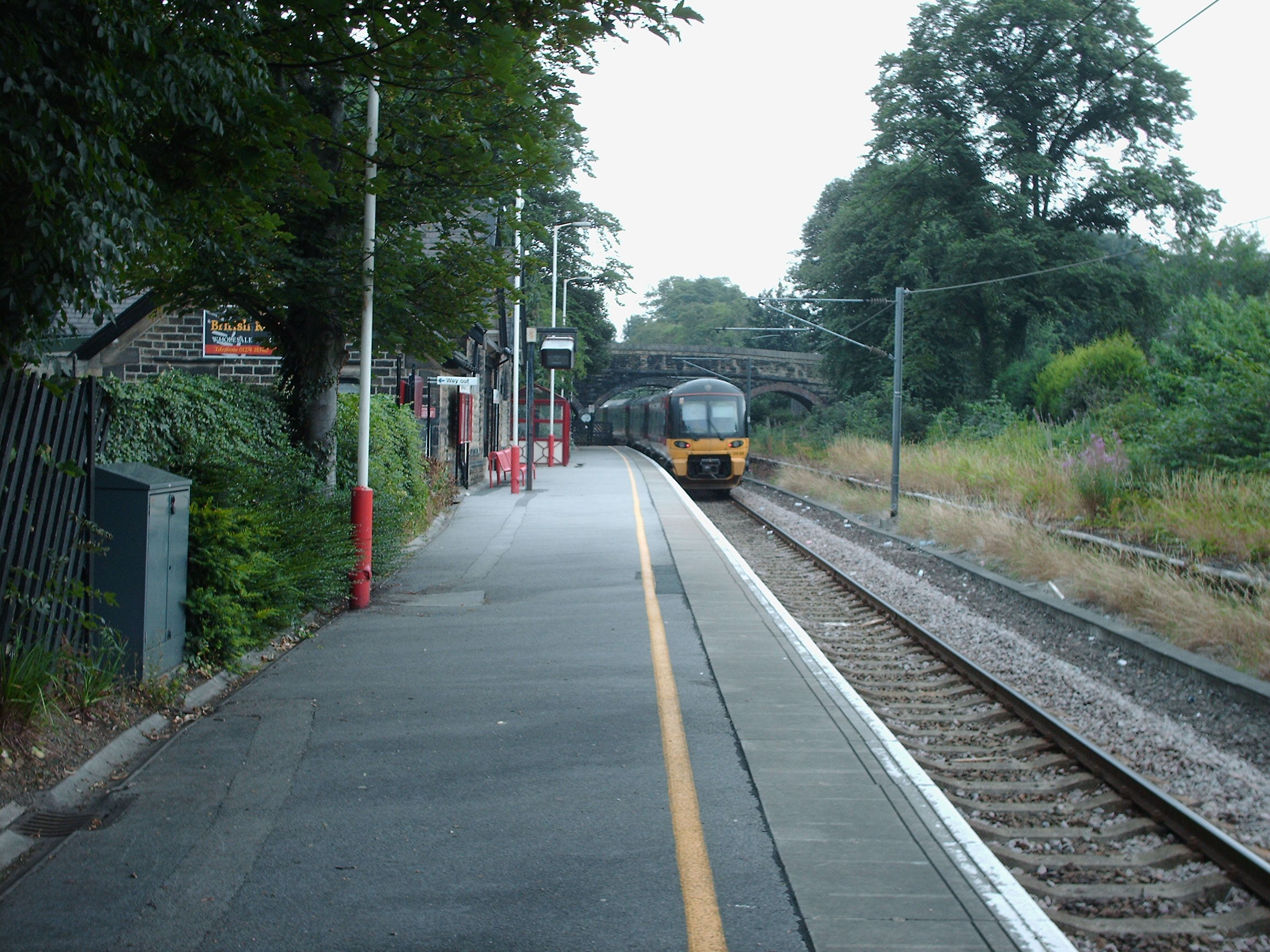
- The view from the platform

General information
- Location: Baildon, City of Bradford; England
- Coordinates: 53.850°N 1.754°W
- Grid reference: SE162393
- Manager: Northern Trains
- Transit authority: West Yorkshire Metro
- Platforms: 1

Other information
- Station code: BLD
- Fare zone: 3
- Classification: DfT category F1

Key dates
- 4 December 1876: Opened
- 5 January 1953: Closed
- 28 January 1957: Reopened
- 29 April 1957: Closed
- 5 January 1973: Reopened

Passengers
- 2021/22: ▲0.207 million
- 2022/23: ▲0.215 million
- 2023/24: ▼0.198 million
- 2024/25: ▲0.211 million
- 2025/26: ▲0.259 million
Location
Notes
- Passenger statistics from the Office of Rail and Road

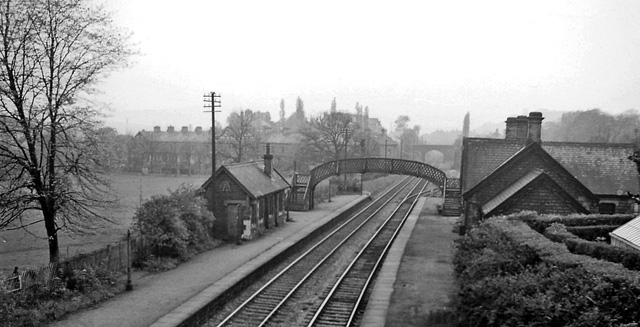
View towards Shipley and Bradford in 1961

Baildon railway station serves the town of Baildon near Shipley in West Yorkshire, England. The station reopened under British Rail on 5 January 1973, by the Chairman of Baildon Council, Arnold Lightowler, having been closed for exactly 20 years. It is situated 4 miles (6 km) north of Bradford Forster Square, on the Wharfedale Line. The station, and all trains serving it, are operated by Northern Trains.

== History ==
Opened by the Midland Railway in December 1876, the station became part of the London, Midland and Scottish Railway during the Grouping of 1923, and then passed to the North Eastern Region of British Railways on nationalisation in 1948. It was then closed by the British Transport Commission as an economy measure in January 1953, though it briefly reopened for three months in 1957 due to a petrol shortage during the Suez Crisis. The goods yard had a single road shed, and two loading docks, being located on the west side of the station. The station is recorded as having a steam crane that could handle loads of just over 1-tonne (1.1-ton). Goods traffic at the station ceased in April 1964, and the goods yard site is now the location of a housing estate.

The line remained open, and in January 1973, Bradford Corporation re-opened the station to rail traffic, a year before the WYPTE would be created and who would re-open stations across Yorkshire in the 1970s, and 80s. Baildon Urban District Council contributed the whole cost of re-opening the station, which was set at £2,500 (equivalent to £30,000 in 2025), largely because the platforms at Baildon were still in-situ and usable.

== Services ==
During Monday to Saturday daytimes, in the evening and all day on Sundays there is an hourly service to Bradford Forster Square and Ilkley. This increases to every thirty minutes at peak times.

Unlike other stations on the Wharfedale and Airedale lines, Baildon has no direct service to Leeds owing to its position on the curve between the two lines. Passengers must instead change at Shipley or Guiseley (Shipley having more services) to access Leeds.

== The site today ==
In February 1983, the line was reduced to single track, so there is only one platform, and the station building has been sold. The station building is architecturally similar to the smaller stations on the Settle Carlisle Line, as it was built in the same era as the Settle line. The track remains in place on the former eastbound line (towards Guiseley). The second platform is disused and covered in weeds. The station is located 4 miles (6.4 km) north of Bradford Forster Square, and 2 miles 79 chains (4.8 km) south-west of Guiseley railway station. Electrification of the line was authorised in the 1990s and completed in 1995.

The station is unstaffed, but a ticket machine is now available. Tickets must be purchased from the machine or on the train with a Promise To Pay Notice from the same machine. A long-line PA system and digital display screens provide train running information. Step-free access is provided from the car park and main entrance to the platform.

Since February 2024 the station has been closed with no services using the curve of line between Shipley and Guiseley via Baildon due to a landslip nearby. Services were predicted unlikely to resume until June 2024, despite an initial Network Rail estimate of a six-week closure. In March 2024 it was announced that the residents of two homes atop the railway embankment subject to the landslip would have to leave their homes as they are no longer structurally sound. As of the 30th of June 2024, the line has been reopened to revenue service.

== Bibliography ==
- Bairstow, Martin (2004). Railways through Airedale & Wharfedale. Farsley: Bairstow. ISBN 1-871944-28-7.
- Butt, R. V. J. (October 1995). The Directory of Railway Stations: details every public and private passenger station, halt, platform and stopping place, past and present (1st ed.). Sparkford: Patrick Stephens Ltd. ISBN 978-1-85260-508-7. OCLC 60251199. OL 11956311M.
- Jowett, Alan (2000). Jowett's Nationalised Railway Atlas (1st ed.). Penryn, Cornwall: Atlantic Transport Publishers. ISBN 978-0-906899-99-1. OCLC 228266687.
- Jowett, Alan (March 1989). Jowett's Railway Atlas of Great Britain and Ireland: From Pre-Grouping to the Present Day (1st ed.). Sparkford: Patrick Stephens Ltd. ISBN 978-1-85260-086-0. OCLC 22311137.

Preceding station	National Rail	Following station
Shipley	Northern Trains Wharfedale Line	Guiseley
	Disused railways	
Shipley; Line and station open	Midland Railway; Wharfedale Line	Esholt; Line open, station closed
