= Ben Rhydding railway station =

Railway station in West Yorkshire, England

Ben Rhydding
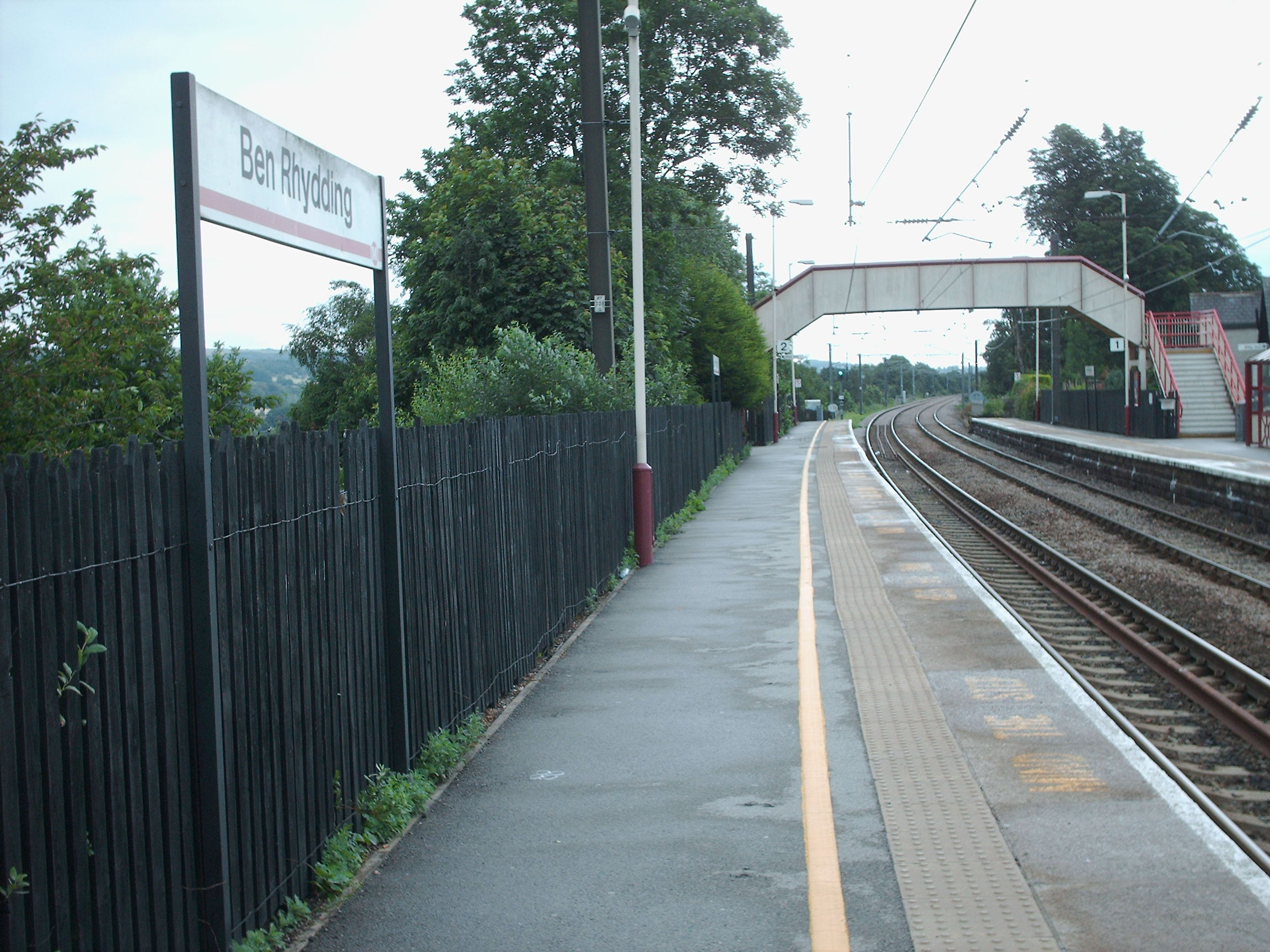
- Platform 2

General information
- Location: Ilkley, City of Bradford; England
- Coordinates: 53.9257°N 1.7973°W
- Grid reference: SE134477
- Manager: Northern Trains
- Transit authority: West Yorkshire Metro
- Platforms: 2

Other information
- Station code: BEY
- Fare zone: 4
- Classification: DfT category F1

Passengers
- 2021/22: ▲0.145 million
- 2022/23: ▲0.184 million
- 2023/24: ▲0.192 million
- 2024/25: ▲0.219 million
- 2025/26: ▲0.227 million
Location
Notes
- Passenger statistics from the Office of Rail and Road

Ben Rhydding railway station serves the Ben Rhydding area of Ilkley, West Yorkshire; it is situated about a mile east of the town centre. It is on the Wharfedale Line, between Ilkley and Leeds/Bradford Forster Square, it is served by Class 331 and Class 333 electric multiple units (EMUs) run by Northern Trains, who also manage the station. It is 15.5 miles (24.9 km) north-west of Leeds, and 1-mile (1.6 km) east of Ilkley railway station.

== Facilities ==
The station has two through-platforms linked by a footbridge. The footbridge is not wheelchair accessible but there is level access to both platforms from separate streets. There is a small station car park with around twenty spaces. There is a public address system, electronic displays on both platforms and both platforms have a passenger shelter. The station is unstaffed and the former station buildings are now in private use.

== Services ==
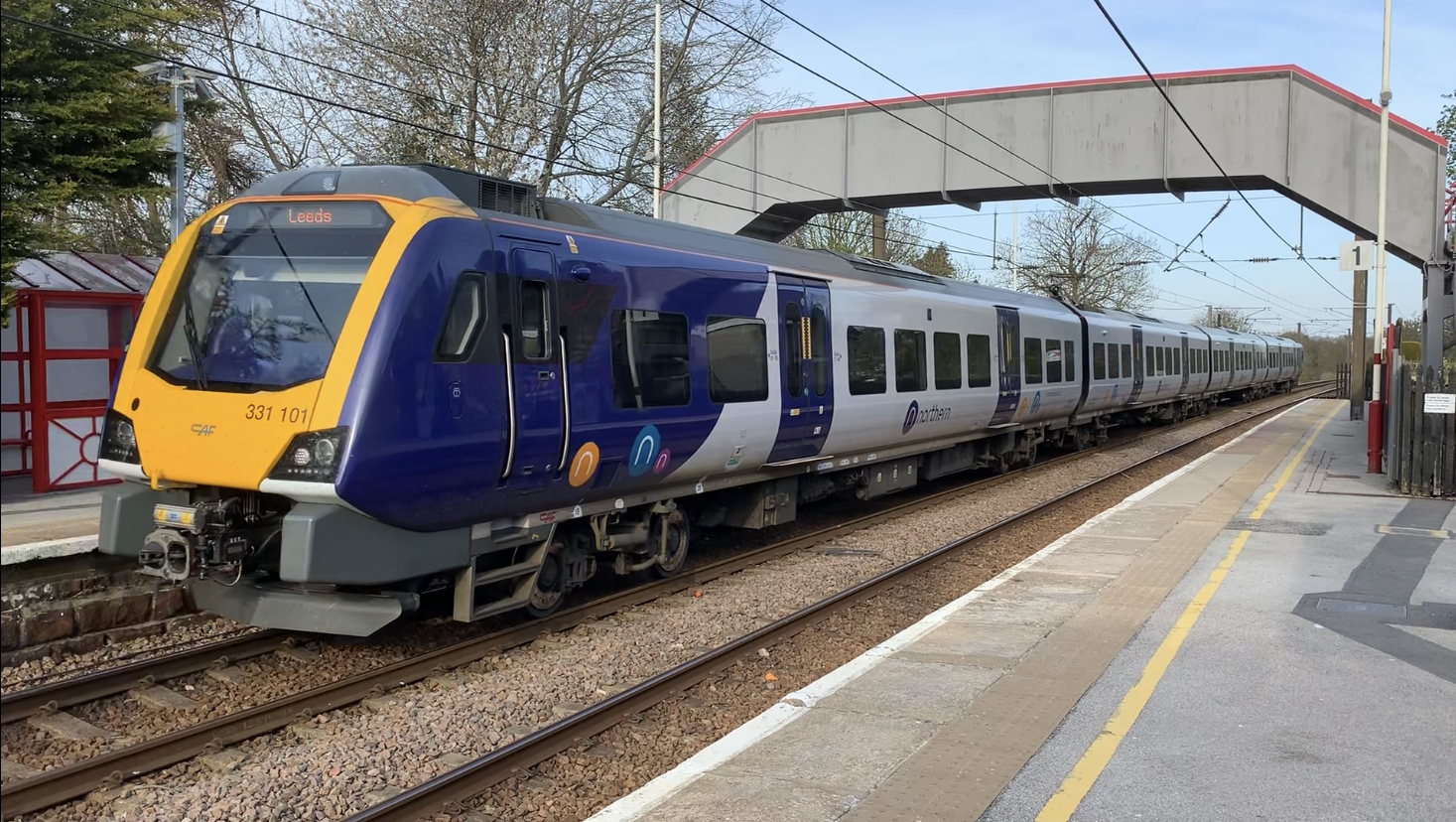
A British Rail Class 331 at Ben Rhydding. These operate along with the more commonly seen British Rail Class 333s on the Wharfedale Line.

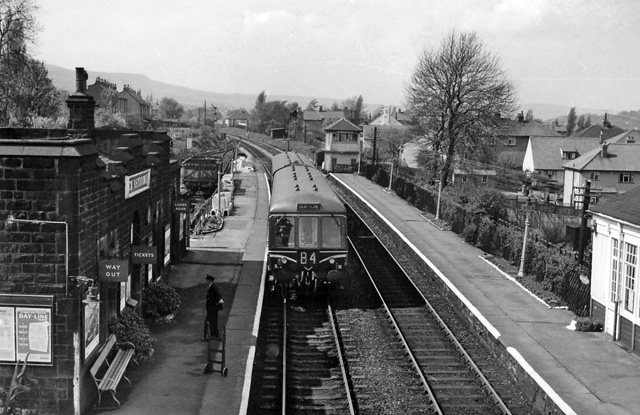
The station in 1961

During Monday to Saturday daytimes services run to/from Leeds twice per hour and hourly to Bradford, whilst there are three services every hour to Ilkley. One extra service each way runs to/from Bradford and Ilkley at peak times. During Monday to Saturday evenings and all day on Sundays, services are hourly to/from both Leeds and Bradford Forster Square (service to/from the latter was doubled on Sundays from two-hourly at the December 2017 timetable change), with two departures per hour to Ilkley. The station has a small car park, but no other amenities. Since electrification of the Wharfedale Line most services are operated by British Rail Class 333 Electric Multiple Units.

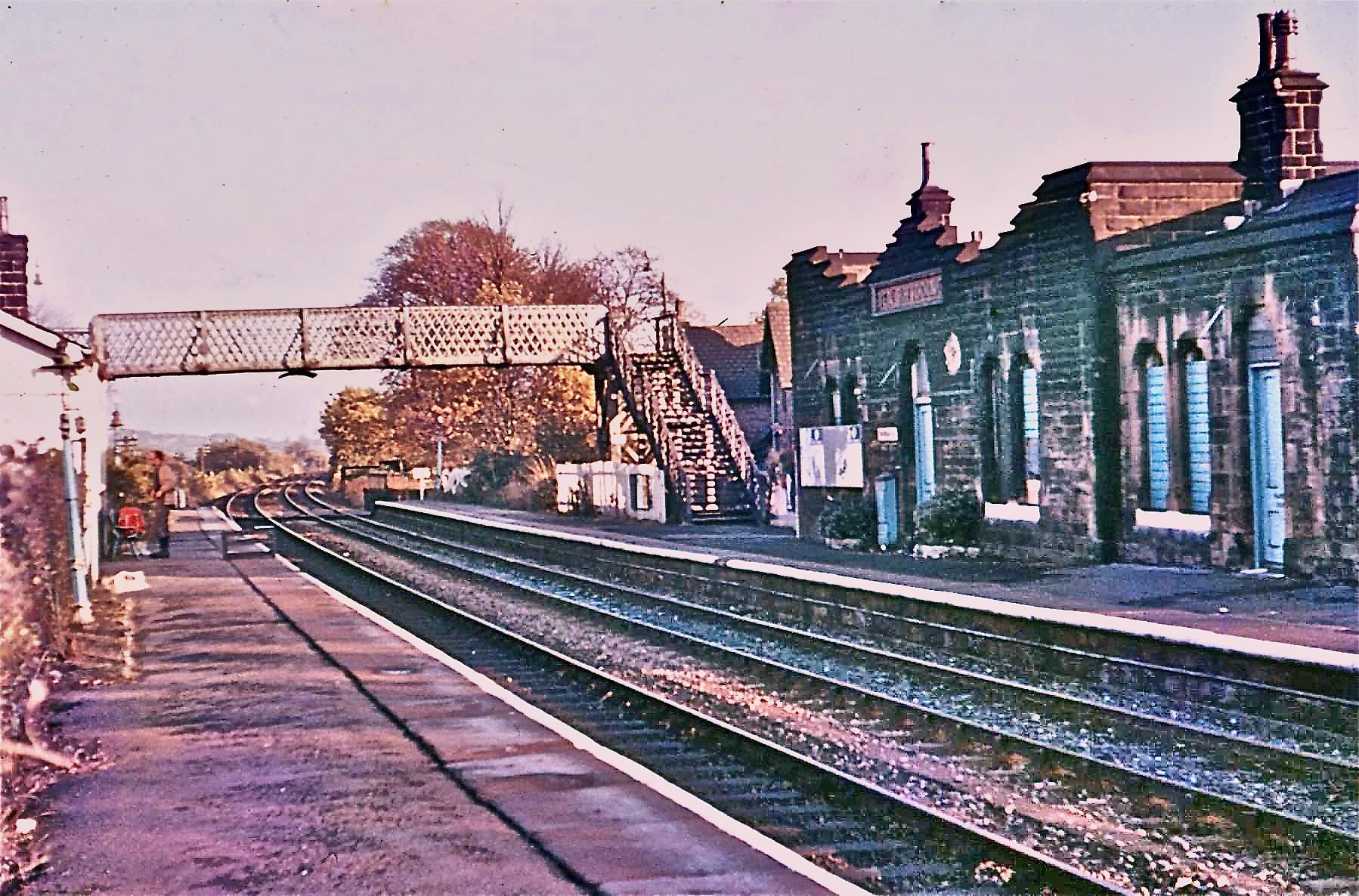
Ben Rhydding station in 1973

== History ==
Ben Rhydding station, built as part of the Otley and Ilkley Joint Railway, was opened to passenger traffic on 1 July 1866, eleven months after the opening of the railway. Originally the station was to be called Wheatley, the name of the village, but the influence of the Ben Rhydding Hydro establishment, saw a name-change on account of those using the station to visit the hydro. In April 1865 the North Eastern Railway Board had "ordered that a small wooden station consisting of booking office, waiting room and retiring room for ladies be provided as a temporary accommodation at Ben Rhydding." Six years later, in May 1871, the Joint Committee reached an agreement with the proprietor of the Ben Rhydding Hydro, that a more permanent station structure should be built at the expense of the Hydro, with a ground rent of a penny per annum, so long as the structures met the approval of the railway engineer, a Mr. Crossley. The Hydro's arrangements with the company lasted until 1885, when the structures – a stone built station house on the south (down) platform and a wooden structure on the north (up) platform – were sold to the railway company for £240. Clients of the hydro were met by the hydro's horse-drawn omnibus, and later by motor-bus, up until some time after the first world war. The station was opened to goods traffic in 1888, and trailing access sidings were provided on the down side for this purpose. A new signal box was opened in 1901, situated at the Ilkley end of the northern platform. The signal box closed in December 1965. Goods traffic ceased on 5 July 1965, and the sidings later removed. Station staff were withdrawn on 7 October 1968, when 'pay-trains' were introduced. The stone station building has subsequently been demolished, and shelter on both platforms is restricted to simple bus-stop type covered areas. Electrification of the Wharfedale Line was undertaken by British Rail between 1994 and 1995 and is of the standard 25kV overhead supply.

Preceding station	National Rail	Following station
Burley-in-Wharfedale	Northern Trains Wharfedale Line	Ilkley
