= Pool-in-Wharfedale railway station =

Disused railway station in West Yorkshire, England

Pool-in-Wharfedale

General information
- Location: Pool-in-Wharfedale, City of Leeds; England
- Coordinates: 53.898410°N 1.628040°W
- Grid reference: SE245447

Other information
- Status: Disused

History
- Pre-grouping: North Eastern Railway
- Post-grouping: London and North Eastern Railway

Key dates
- 1865: Opened
- 22 March 1965: Closed
Location

Pool-in-Wharfedale railway station was a railway station serving the village of Pool-in-Wharfedale in West Yorkshire, England. It was opened by the North Eastern Railway (NER) as part of a branch line constructed to link the line between Leeds and Harrogate with a new joint line, the Otley and Ilkley Joint Railway that the NER was building in conjunction with the Midland Railway. The station operated for 100 years, being opened in 1865 and closing as part of the Beeching cuts in March 1965. The station's name appeared as Pool in earlier Bradshaws, but changed to Pool-in-Wharfedale by the October 1931 issue.

The defunct railway was lifted in 1966 and the station building was demolished in 1974; a housing development now occupies the site.

The trackbed between Burley in Wharfedale, Otley and Pool is to become a cycleway, footpath and equestrian route known as the Wharfedale Greenway, with possible extensions onward to Ilkley alongside the extant railway. Planning permission for the first phase of the greenway was granted in July 2020.

Preceding station	Disused railways	Following station
Otley	North Eastern Railway	Arthington
