= Menston =

Village and civil parish in West Yorkshire, England

Coordinates: 53.8912°N 1.7344°W

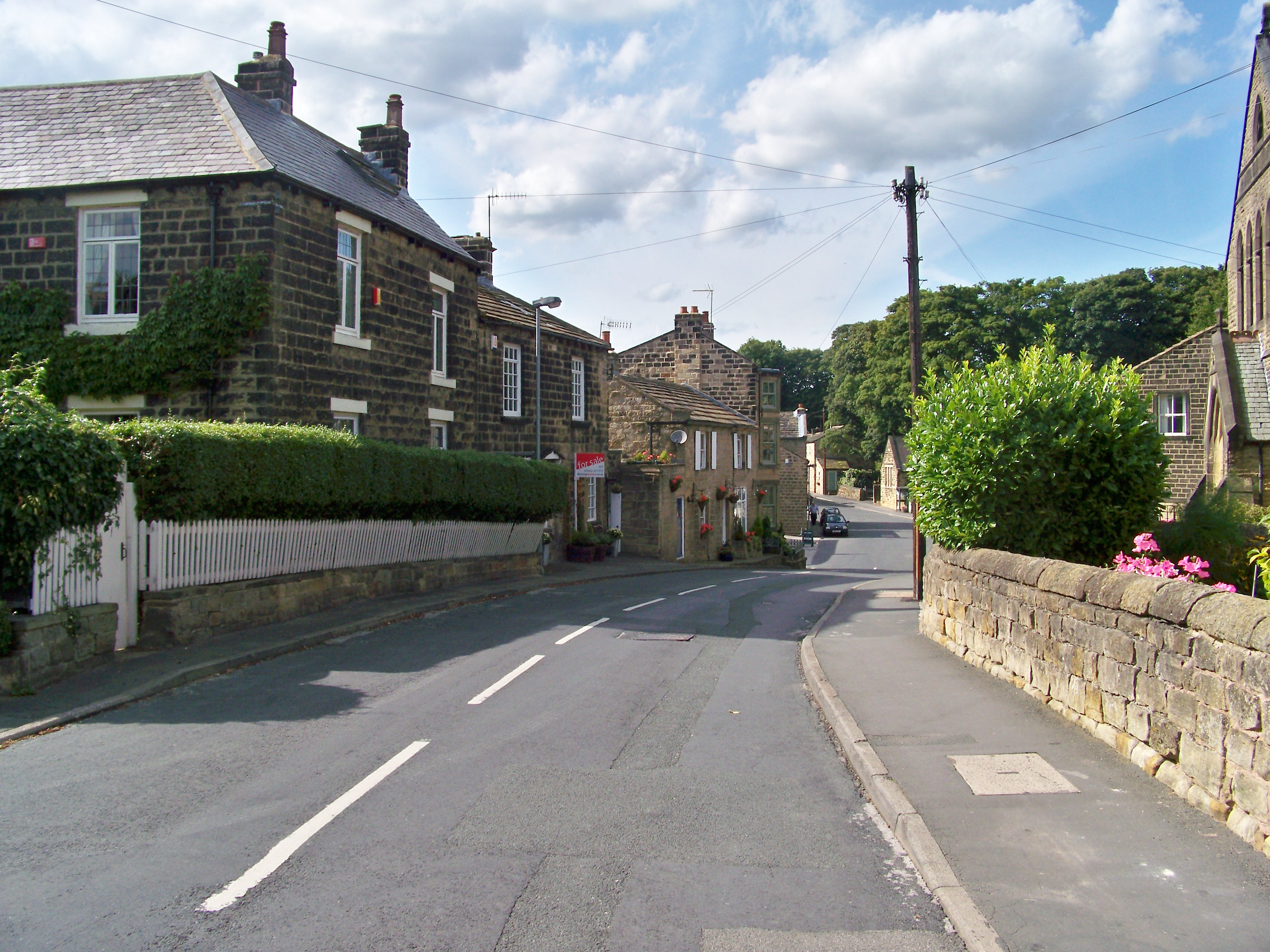
- Main Street

- Location within West Yorkshire
- Population: 4,498 (2011 census)
- OS grid reference: SE174439
- Civil parish: Menston
- Metropolitan borough: City of Bradford
- Metropolitan county: West Yorkshire
- Region: Yorkshire and the Humber
- Country: England
- Sovereign state: United Kingdom
- Post town: ILKLEY
- Postcode district: LS29
- Dialling code: 01943
- Police: West Yorkshire
- Fire: West Yorkshire
- Ambulance: Yorkshire
- UK Parliament: Shipley

Menston is a village and civil parish in the county of West Yorkshire, England. The civil parish is within Wharfedale Ward in the metropolitan borough of Bradford, along with Burley in Wharfedale. A small part of Menston, south of the village, is outside the civil parish in the Guiseley and Rawdon ward of the City of Leeds. At the 2011 census the parish had a population of 4,498 (down from 4,660 in 2001). The village is home to St Mary's Menston Catholic Voluntary Academy, a secondary school with academy status in the part of Menston included in the City of Leeds. Menston is situated near the towns of Guiseley and Otley, with which it shares strong transport and community links. The name Menston derives from the Old English Mensaingtūn meaning 'settlement connected with Mensa'.

== Landmarks ==
Menston's Anglican parish church is dedicated to St John the Divine, and is part of the Diocese of Leeds. Other notable buildings include the former High Royds Hospital and St Mary's Menston Catholic Academy, both of which are located in the Leeds part of Menston.

The site of High Royds Hospital, originally the West Riding Pauper Lunatic Asylum, which is just inside the City of Leeds metropolitan borough, has been converted into housing called "Highroyds Village". This reflects Menston's growing size and increasing demand for housing over recent decades. The population of Menston has been steadily increasing, and as a result, Menston Primary School, which was once under threat of closure in the 1980s, has seen a rise in student numbers.

== Transport ==
Menston is on the A65, approximately ten miles north-west of the centre of Leeds and 9 miles north of Bradford centre, between Guiseley and Burley-in-Wharfedale. There are bus services to Leeds, Otley and Wetherby (an infrequent bus service run by Utopia).

Menston also has a railway station between Guiseley and Burley on the Wharfedale Line, with direct trains to Leeds, Bradford Forster Square and Ilkley. Menston once had rail links to Otley, via the (now closed) Arthington to Menston Line.

Climate Action Menston have prepared a walking map of the village which can be downloaded from their website.

== Cultural references ==
Highroyds is mentioned in the Kaiser Chiefs song of the same name, from the album, Yours Truly Angry Mob. The Kaiser Chiefs met and formed in the same class at St Mary's Catholic High School, now St. Mary's Menston.

== Gallery ==
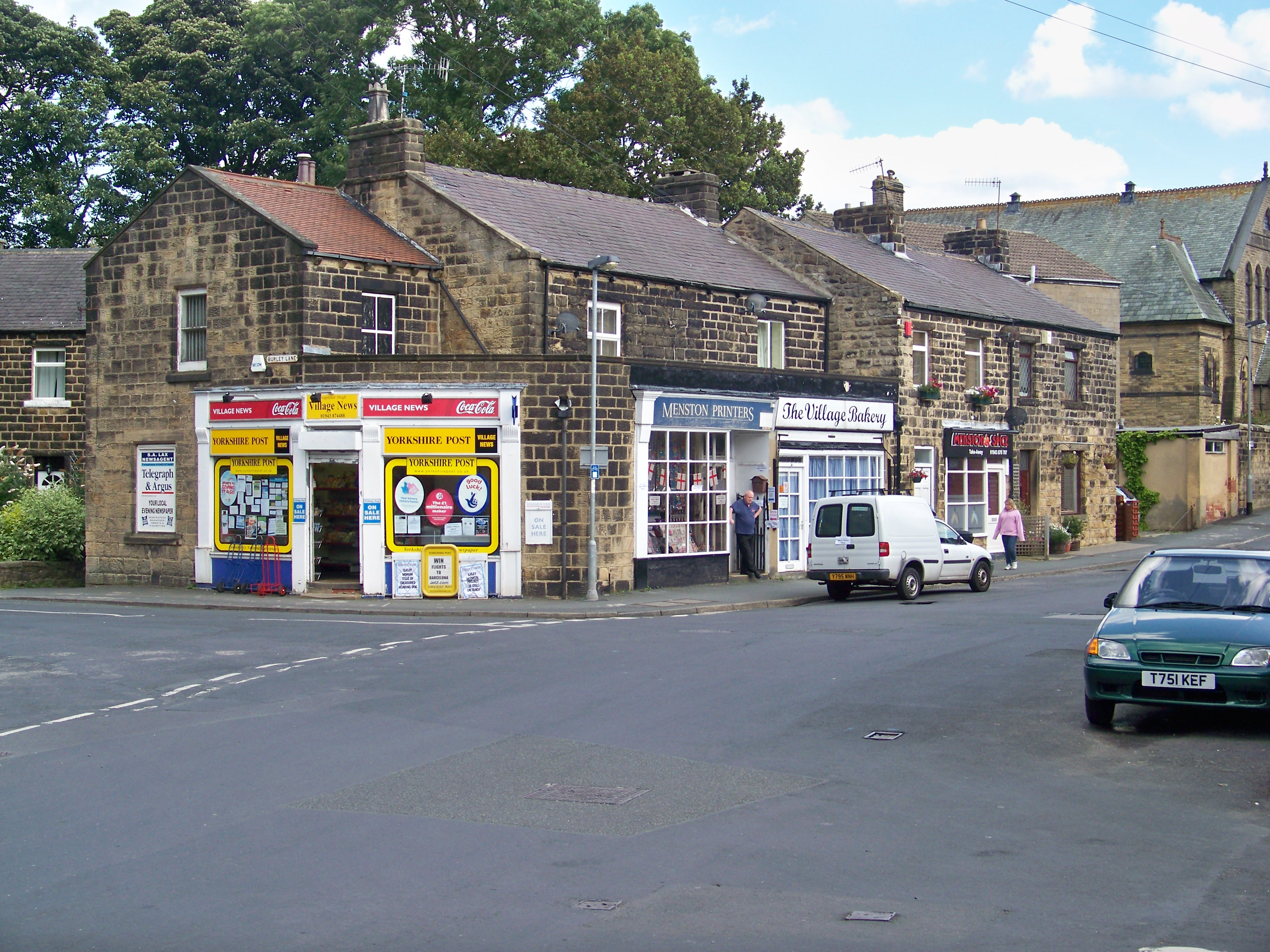
Shops on Main Street and Burley Lane junction

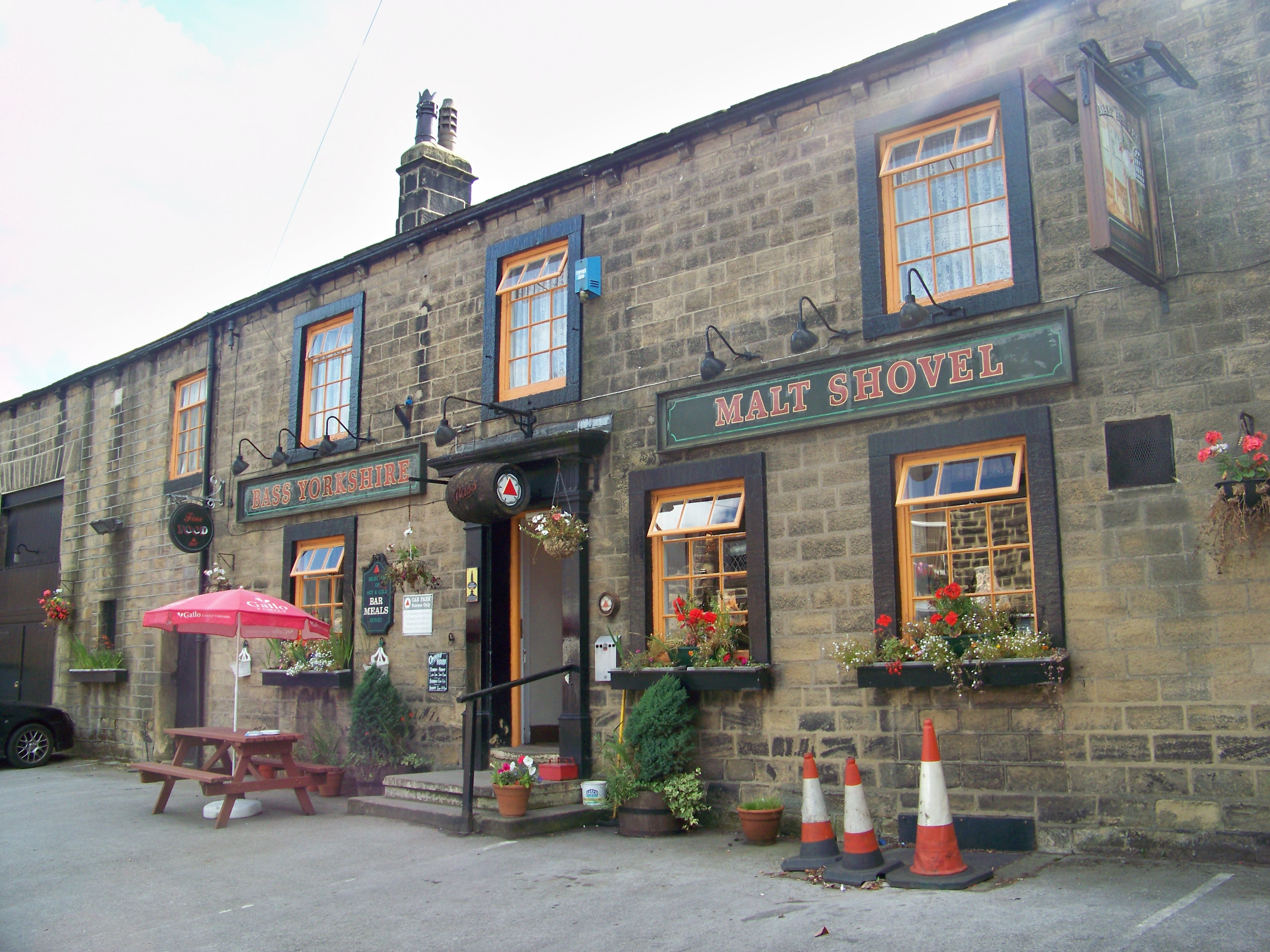
The Malt Shovel

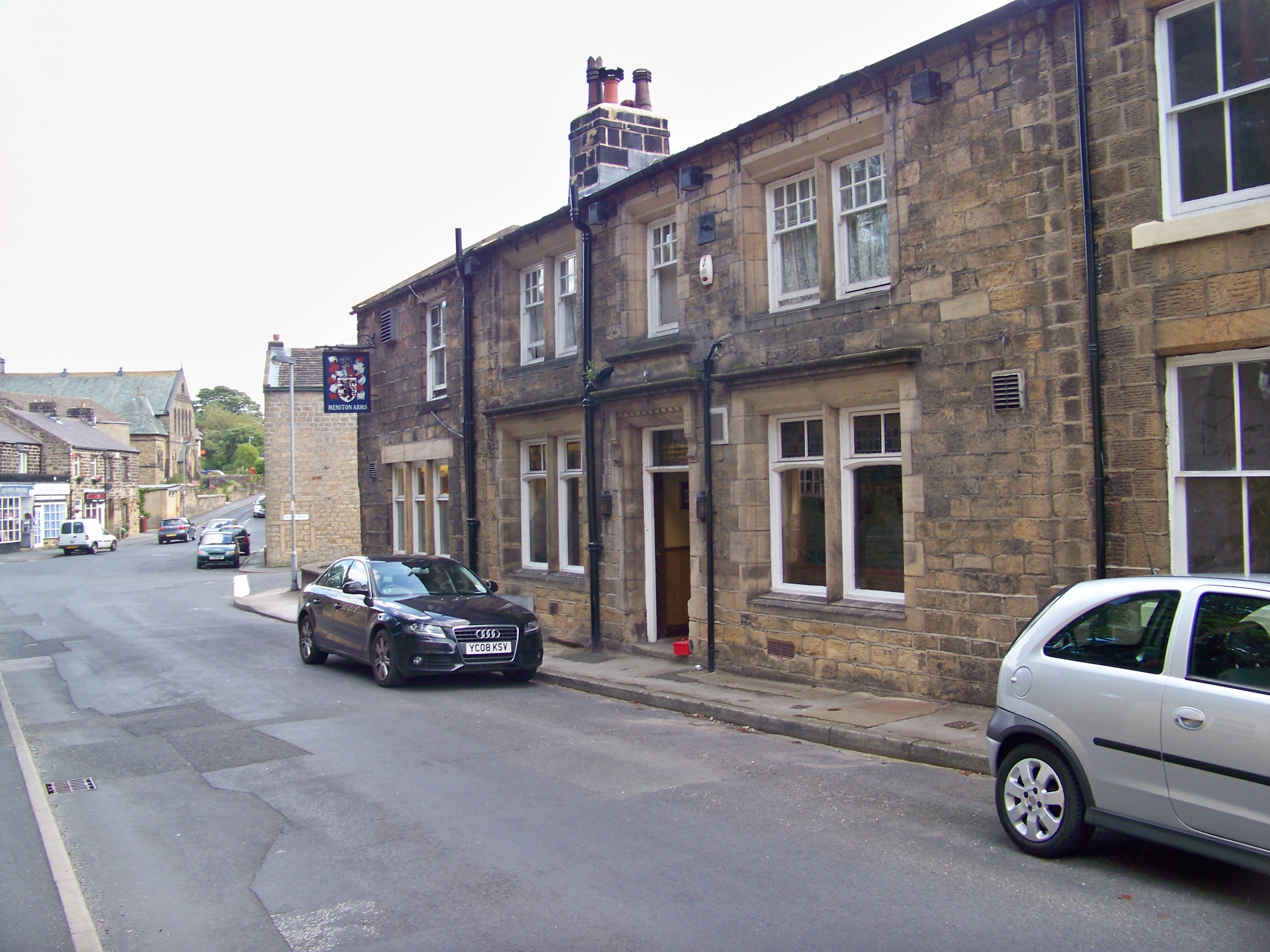
Menston Arms

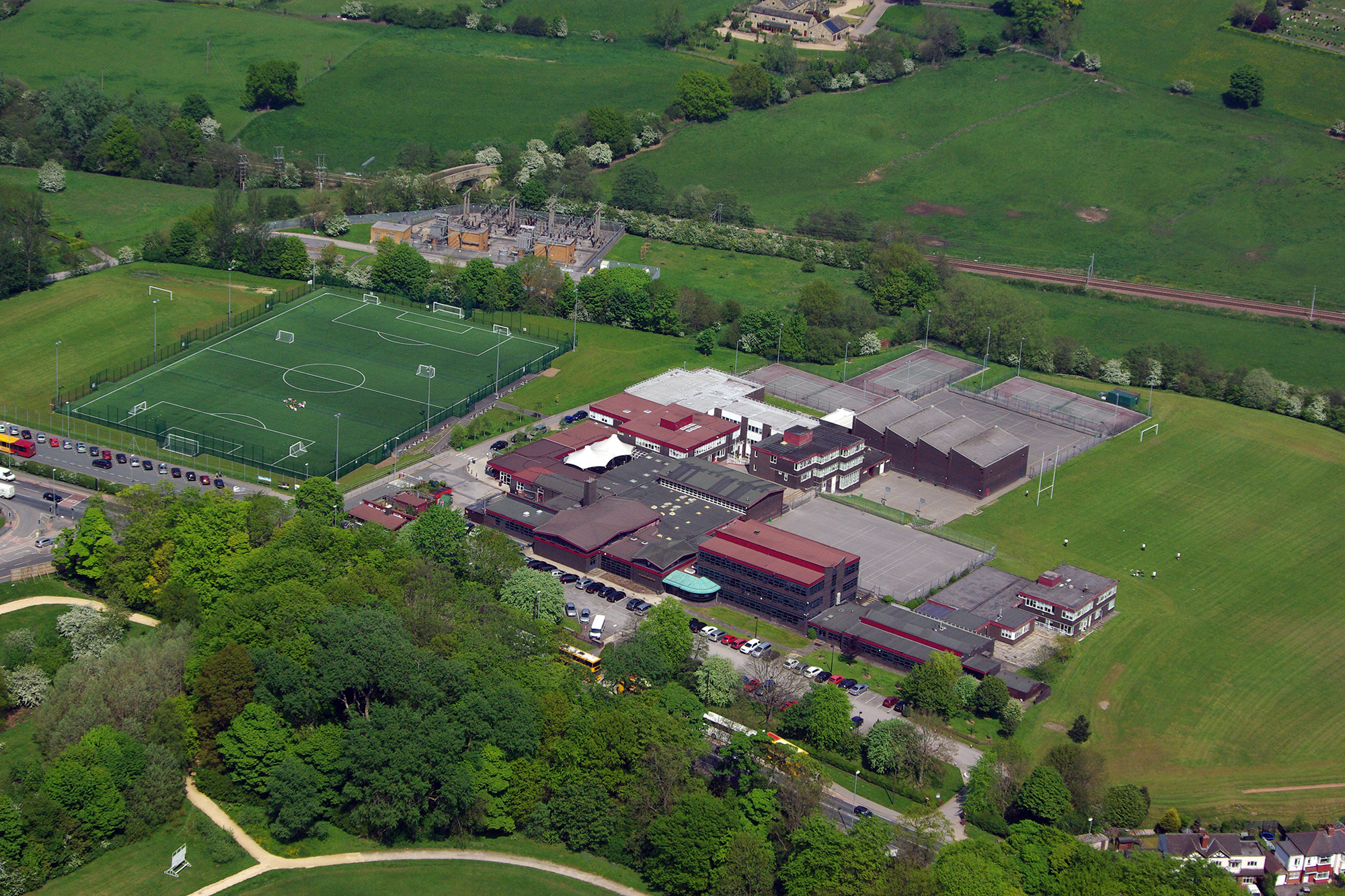
St. Mary's Catholic High School aerial photo

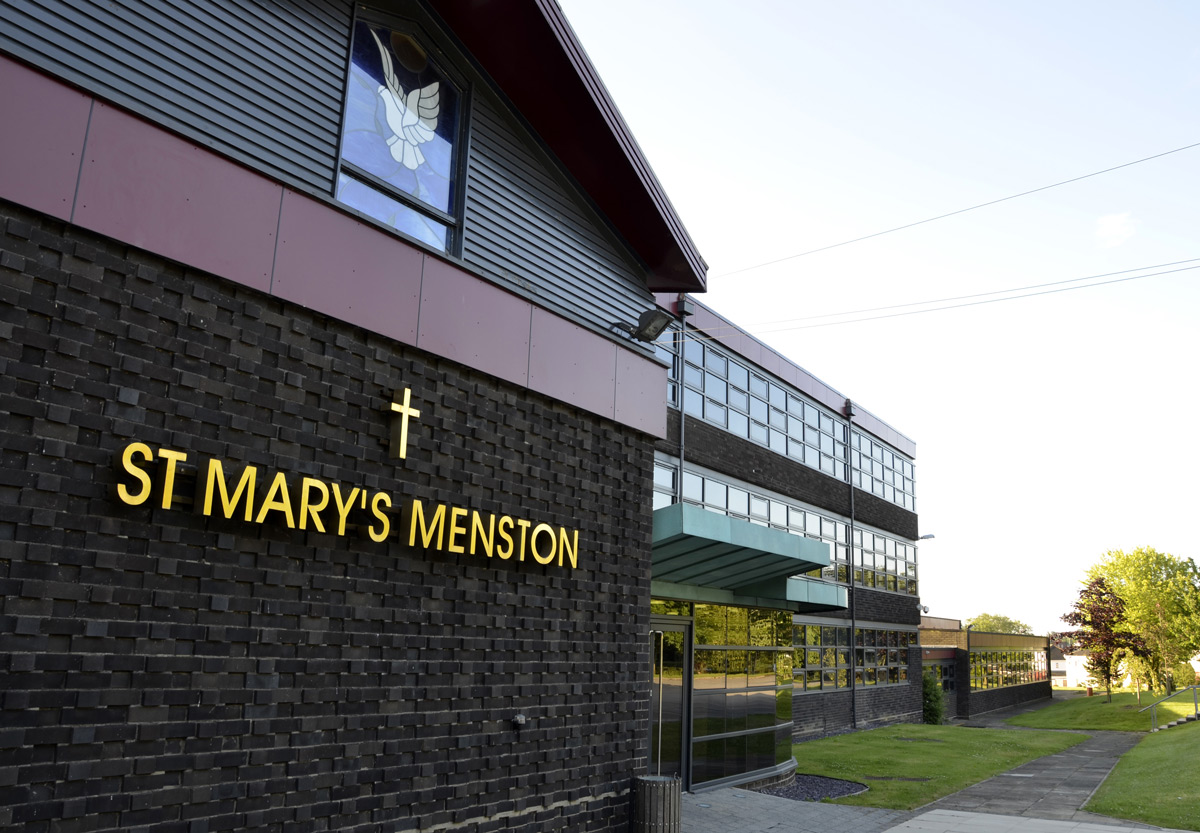
St. Mary's Catholic Voluntary Academy Visitor Entrance

== Sport ==
Menston is home to football club, Menston Town FC who currently play in the Wharfedale Triangle Division 2 after being established in 2010.

Menston cricket club, which plays at the Fox Ground. Offering 1st, 2nd and 3rd team seniors men cricket, has recently merged with CromPark adding two more Saturday 1st and 2nd senior men's teams to the rosta. The club boasts a large junior section which contributed 16 teams (from U18 - U9) to the AWJCL.

Menston Cricket Club is an active promoter of girls and women's participation in cricket. With 2 all girls teams, and a women's team flying high in the inaugural women's cricket league.

Home also to Menston Juniors Football Club (MJFC).

== Notable people ==
Paul Jewell, a retired footballer and the former manager of Bradford City, Sheffield Wednesday, Wigan Athletic and most recently Ipswich Town, has lived in the village since the 1990s. Dean Windass, the former Bradford City and Hull City footballer, lives in the village.

Others born in Menston were:

- Annie Margaret Barr (1899–1973), a Unitarian minister and founder of the Kharang Rural Centre in the Khasi Hills, North East India
- Bill Bowes (1908–1987), English professional cricketer active from 1929 to 1947
- Eric Knight (1897–1943), the author who created the fictional collie Lassie
- Sam Riley (born 1980), actor
- Smith Wigglesworth (1859–1947), a notable early Pentecostal preacher
- Alan Greaves (1969 - ), archaeologist

== See also ==
- Listed buildings in Menston
