= Guiseley railway station =

Railway station in West Yorkshire, England

Guiseley
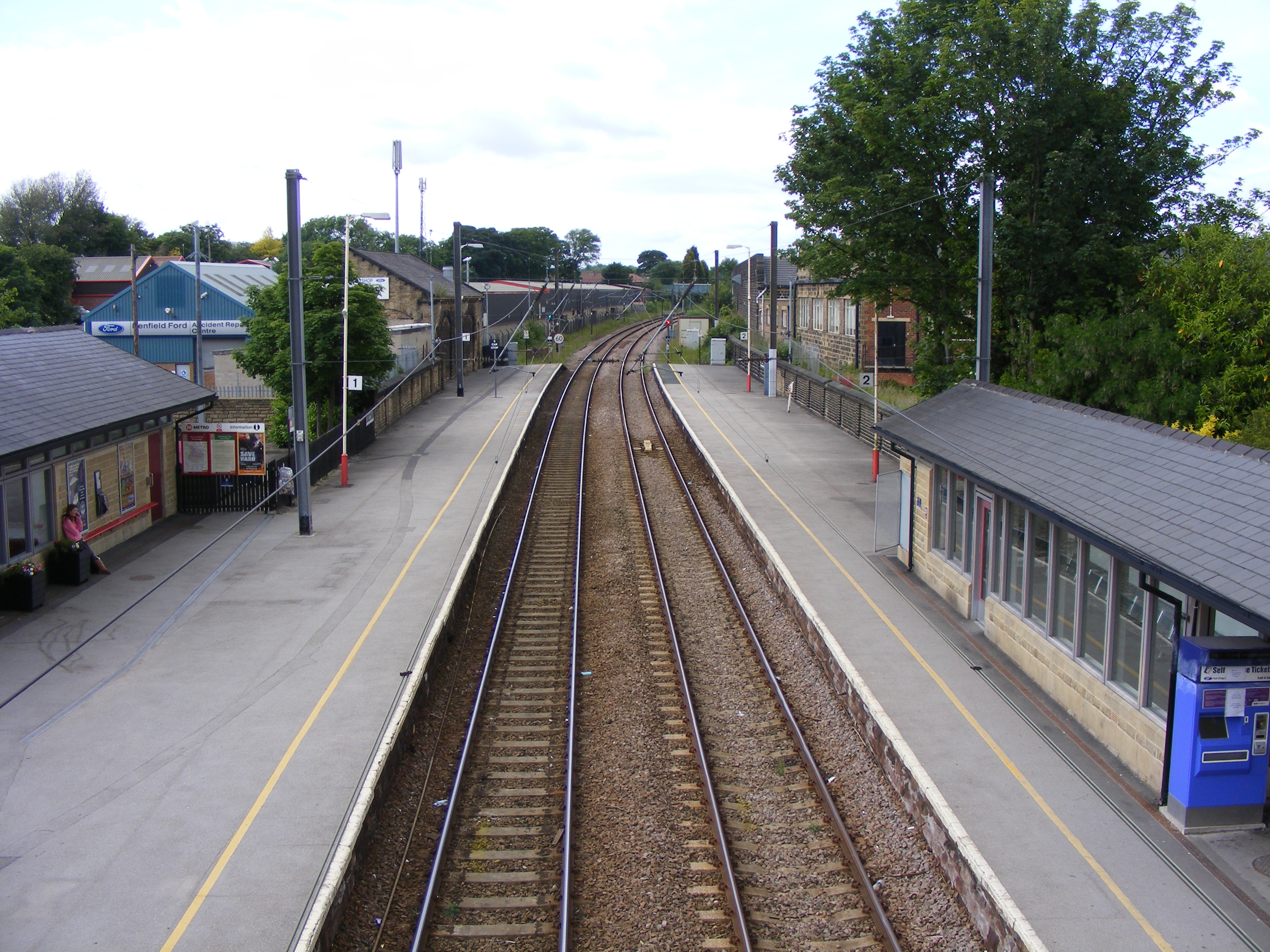
- Guiseley Station

General information
- Location: Guiseley, City of Leeds; England
- Coordinates: 53.876°N 1.715°W
- Grid reference: SE188422
- Manager: Northern Trains
- Transit authority: West Yorkshire (Metro)
- Platforms: 2

Other information
- Station code: GSY
- Fare zone: 3

History
- Opened: 1865

Passengers
- 2021/22: ▲0.711 million
- 2022/23: ▲0.871 million
- 2023/24: ▲0.921 million
- 2024/25: ▲1.019 million
- 2025/26: ▲1.079 million
Location
Notes
- Passenger statistics from the Office of Rail and Road

Guiseley railway station serves Guiseley in the City of Leeds metropolitan borough, West Yorkshire, England. On the Wharfedale Line between Ilkley and Leeds/Bradford Forster Square, it is served mostly by Class 333 electric trains run by Northern Trains, which also manages the station.

== History ==
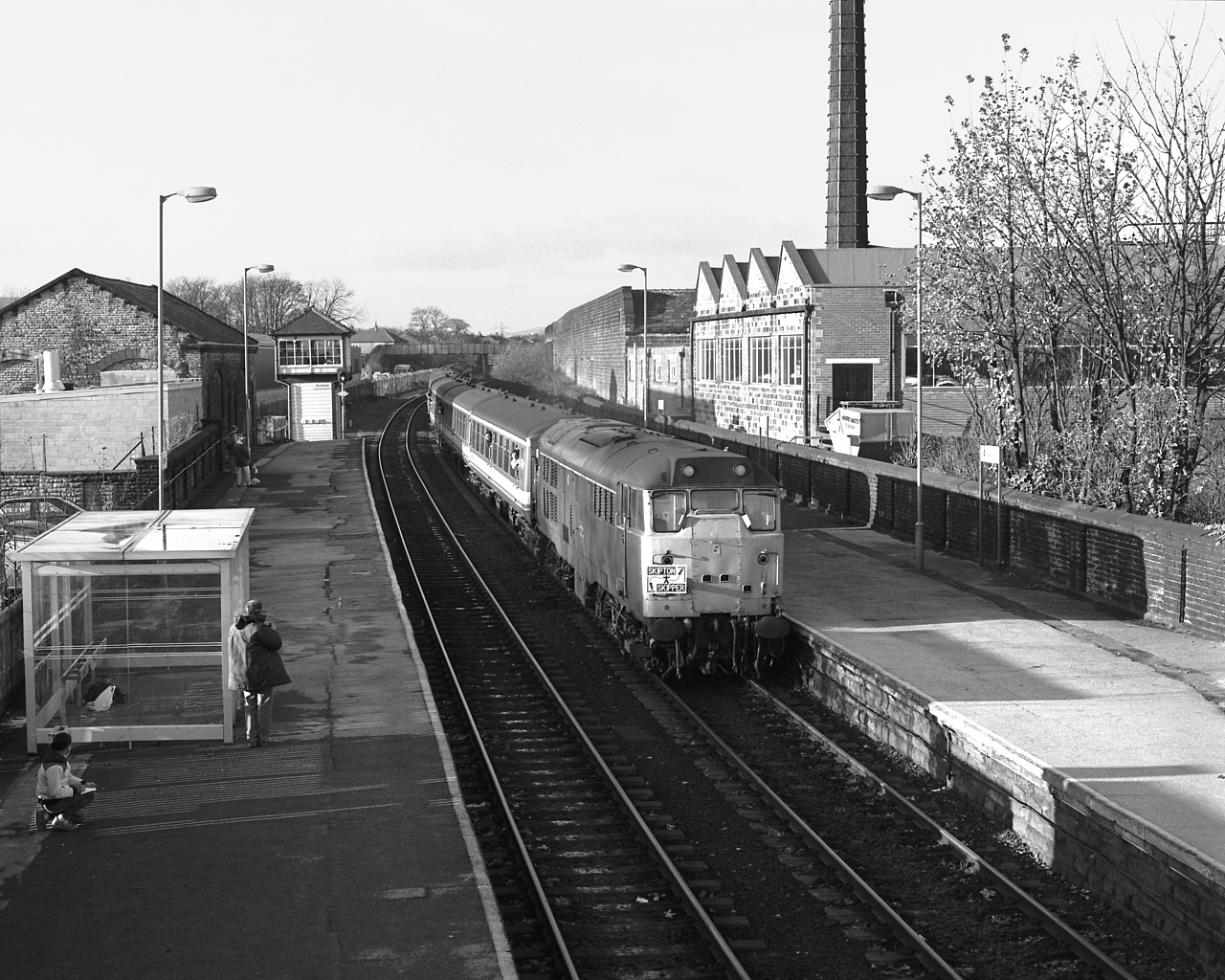
The station before electrification

The station opened in 1865, originally being owned by the Midland Railway. There were services to Otley until 1965, when the Arthington to Menston line closed under the Beeching axe. The line was electrified between 1994 and 1995, while the station was largely reconstructed in 2002.

== Services ==
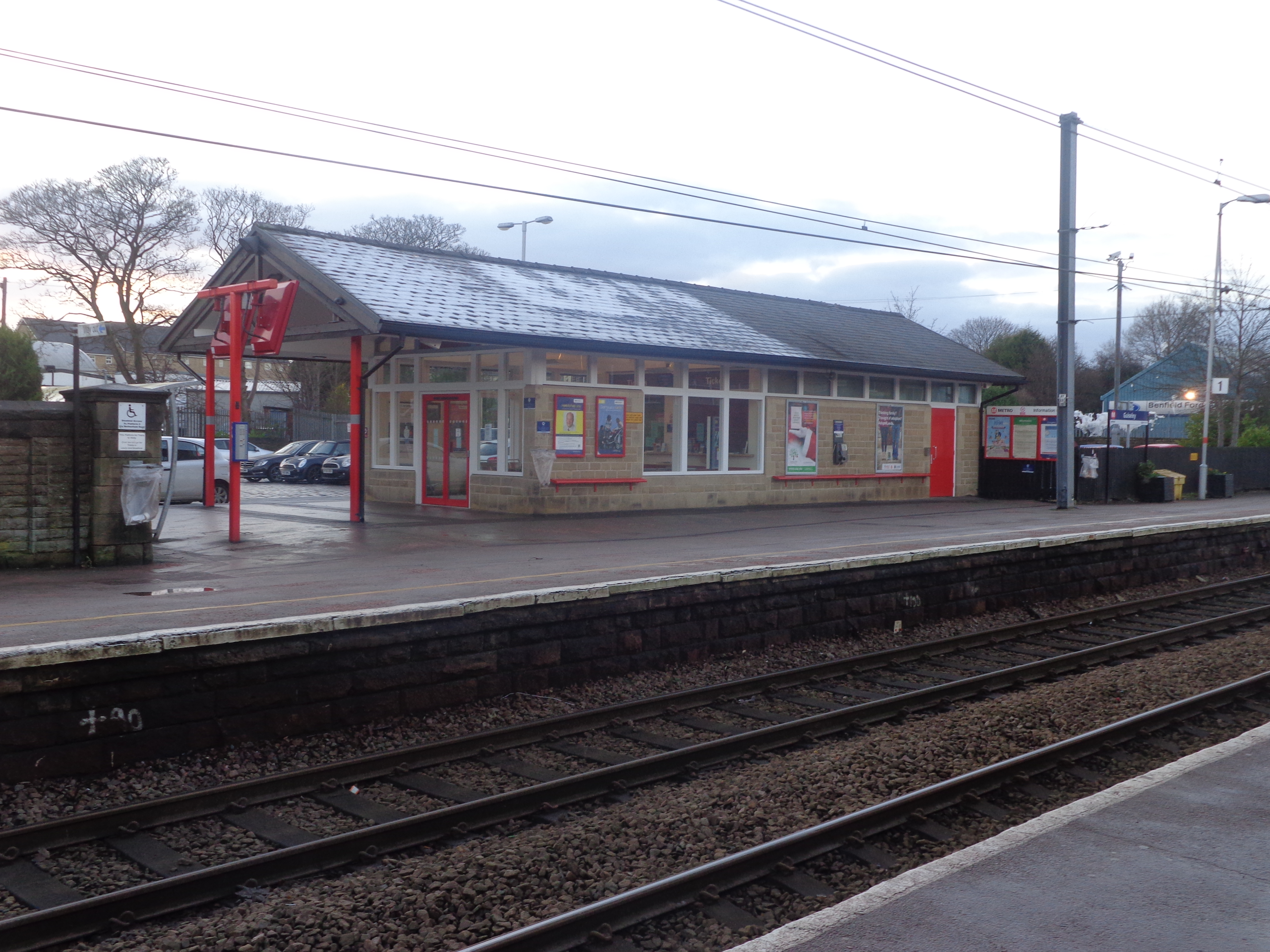
The 2002 waiting room and ticket office.

During Monday to Saturday daytimes services run to/from Leeds twice per hour and once each hour to/from Bradford (half-hourly in the peaks), meaning that as Guiseley is the first station that is served by trains on both branches of the line, there are three or four services every hour to Ilkley. On Monday to Saturday evenings, services are hourly to/from both Leeds and Bradford Forster Square. On Sundays, services are hourly to/from Leeds and Bradford. Services at the station are operated by British Rail Class 333 and Class 331 electric multiple units.

== Facilities ==
The station facilities were redeveloped in 2002 to give a new waiting room on platform two (for trains to Leeds and Bradford) and a waiting room and ticket office on platform one (for trains to Ilkley). Ticket office opening times are listed on the Guiseley station page of the National Rail website. A small car park is accessible from Station Road and the station has cycle lockers situated on either platform with an additional cycle shelter outside the ticket office. The station is equipped with live information displays, there is a payphone on platform one and a help point outside the ticket office. A ticket vending machine, which can be used outside of ticket office hours, is on platform two..

A pedestrian footbridge links the two platforms. Passengers on foot can access platform 1 from Station Road and platform 2 via a path from Netherfield Road, also a path opposite the station ticket office connects via Morton Terrace to Otley Road.

A car park was opened on Netherfield Road in July 2009 to provide 145 spaces to alleviate parking for commuters using the station. Car parking charges were introduced for the Netherfield Road Car Park in October 2025.

In July 2026 the West Yorkshire Combined Authority announced a project to provide step free access between platforms by installing a new pedestrian bridge and lift, the new access is expected to be operational in summer 2028.

== Connections to Leeds Bradford Airport ==
Along with Horsforth station on the Harrogate Line, Guiseley is one of the two closest railway stations to Leeds Bradford Airport, at nearby Yeadon. An hourly bus service (Service A3) between the airport and Bradford Interchange runs along nearby Oxford Road. A more frequent bus service to/from the airport (Service A1) runs from Leeds railway station but takes longer.

Preceding station	National Rail	Following station
Leeds	Northern Trains Wharfedale Line	Menston
Baildon	Northern Trains Wharfedale Line	Menston
