= Listed buildings in Menston =

Menston is a civil parish in the metropolitan borough of the City of Bradford, West Yorkshire, England. It contains 15 listed buildings that are recorded in the National Heritage List for England. Of these, one is listed at Grade II*, the middle of the three grades, and the others are at Grade II, the lowest grade. The parish contains the village of Menston and the surrounding countryside. The listed buildings consist of houses, a farmhouse and farm buildings, and a public house with an attached outbuilding.

== Key ==
Grade	Criteria
II*	Particularly important buildings of more than special interest
II	Buildings of national importance and special interest

== Buildings ==
Name and location	Photograph	Date	Notes	Grade
Fairfax Hall, Menston Old Hall; 53.89212°N 1.74687°W	—	17th century	The house, which was restored in about 1910, is in stone, with a string course, and a stone slab roof with a moulded coped gable end facing the road. There are two storeys and an attic, and an L-shaped plan, with two ranges at right angles. In the gable end is a two-storey canted bay window containing mullioned and transomed windows. The other windows are mullioned, some with round-headed lights.	II*
Barn, Menston Old Hall; 53.89250°N 1.74695°W	—	17th century	The barn is in stone with a stone slab roof. It has a rectangular plan with an aisle, and has been extended and altered.	II
Grange Farm House and The Grange; 53.89271°N 1.74868°W	—	1672	A farmhouse, later divided, it is in stone, and has a stone slab roof with coped gables and small moulded kneelers. There are two storeys, and in the centre is a two-storey gabled porch containing a doorway with a pointed arch and an initialled and dated lintel. Above it is a three-light window with a hood mould, and in the gable is a blind circular window. There is one sash window, and the other windows are mullioned, some with round-arched lights. Over the ground floor openings is a continuous hood mould. To the right is an external chimney with two gargoyles.	II
Ivy Cottage; 53.89028°N 1.72627°W	—	Late 17th or early 18th century (probable)	A stone house that has a stone slab roof with moulded kneelers. There are two storeys and a rear extension. In the front are two canted bay windows with a continuous hood mould above them. The other windows are mullioned, and the doorway has a Tudor arched head.	II
30 Main Street; 53.89122°N 1.74586°W	—	18th century (probable)	The house, which has been much altered, is in stone, with moulded gutter brackets and a stone slab roof. There are two storeys and three bays. The central doorway has a moulded surround, and the windows are modern replacements.	II
34 Main Street; 53.89100°N 1.74541°W	—	18th century	A stone house with sill bands, moulded eaves with paired brackets, and a stone slab roof. There are three storeys and one bay. The house contains a full-height canted bay window with sash windows, and a doorway to the left.	II
36 Main Street; 53.89095°N 1.74535°W	—	18th century (probable)	A stone house with a stone slate roof and two storeys. The doorway is in the centre, the window to the right has been enlarged, and the other windows are sashes.	II
38 Main Street; 53.89086°N 1.74525°W	—	18th century (probable)	A stone house with a stone slate roof and two storeys. The openings have been altered and the door is in a porch projecting on the right.	II
Hagwood Farm House; 53.89286°N 1.74927°W	—	18th century (probable)	A stone house with widely spaced gutter blocks, and a stone slab roof with coped gables and kneelers. There are two storeys, a symmetrical front of two bays, and a recessed single-bay extension on the left. The doorway is in the centre, the windows are two-light sashes with mullions, and in the extension is a French window.	II
Barn north of Hagwood Farm House; 53.89333°N 1.74911°W	—	18th century (probable)	The barn is in stone with a stone slab roof. On the south side is a buttress and an entrance with a segmental-arched head. The barn also contains a doorway to the left, a blocked doorway at a higher level, and two small windows.	II
Barn northeast of Hagwood Farm House; 53.89326°N 1.74933°W	—	18th century (probable)	The barn is in stone with a stone slab roof. There are two storeys, small square openings below the eaves, and a doorway in the upper storey at the south end.	II
Well House; 53.89539°N 1.74395°W	—	18th century	A stone house with a stone slab roof, two storeys and two bays. In the basement is an old stone bathing well.	II
40 Main Street; 53.89082°N 1.74514°W	—	c. 1800	A stone house with paired gutter brackets, and a slate roof, hipped at the corner. There are two storeys and an L-shaped plan. The front, at right angles to the road, has three bays, and a central doorway with a fanlight and a keystone. The windows have been altered.	II
The Malt Shovel Public House; 53.89108°N 1.74570°W		Early 19th century (probable)	The public house is in stone with moulded gutter blocks and a stone slab roof. There are two storeys and three bays. In the centre is a doorway with a moulded surround, pilasters, and a straight hood. The windows are unevenly spaced, and have projecting surrounds.	II
Outbuilding, The Malt Shovel Public House; 53.89104°N 1.74563°W		Early 19th century (probable)	The outbuilding attached to the east of the public house is in stone and has a stone slate roof. There are two storeys, in the centre is a cart entrance with a flat lintel, and elsewhere are doors and window, including a sash window, with plain surrounds.	II
