= Wharfedale line =

Railway line in England

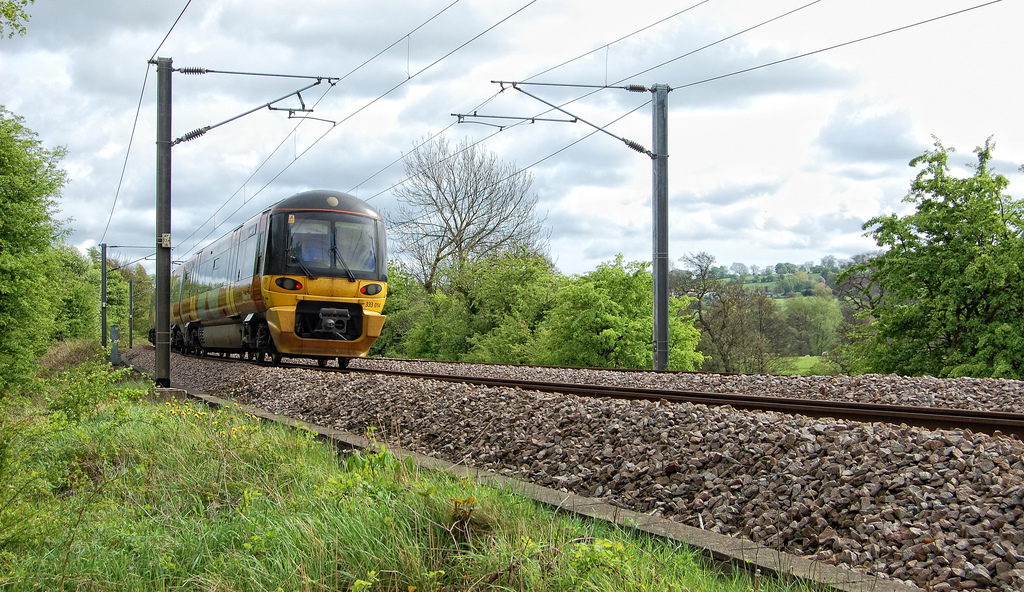
- Class 333 at Milnerwood Junction in 2009

Overview
- Owner: Network Rail
- Locale: West Yorkshire; Yorkshire and the Humber

Service
- Operator: Northern Trains
- Depot: Neville Hill (On the Leeds to Selby Line
- Rolling stock: British Rail Class 333; British Rail Class 331

Technical
- Track gauge: 1,435 mm (4 ft 8 1/2 in) standard gauge
- Electrification: Overhead catenary
Route map
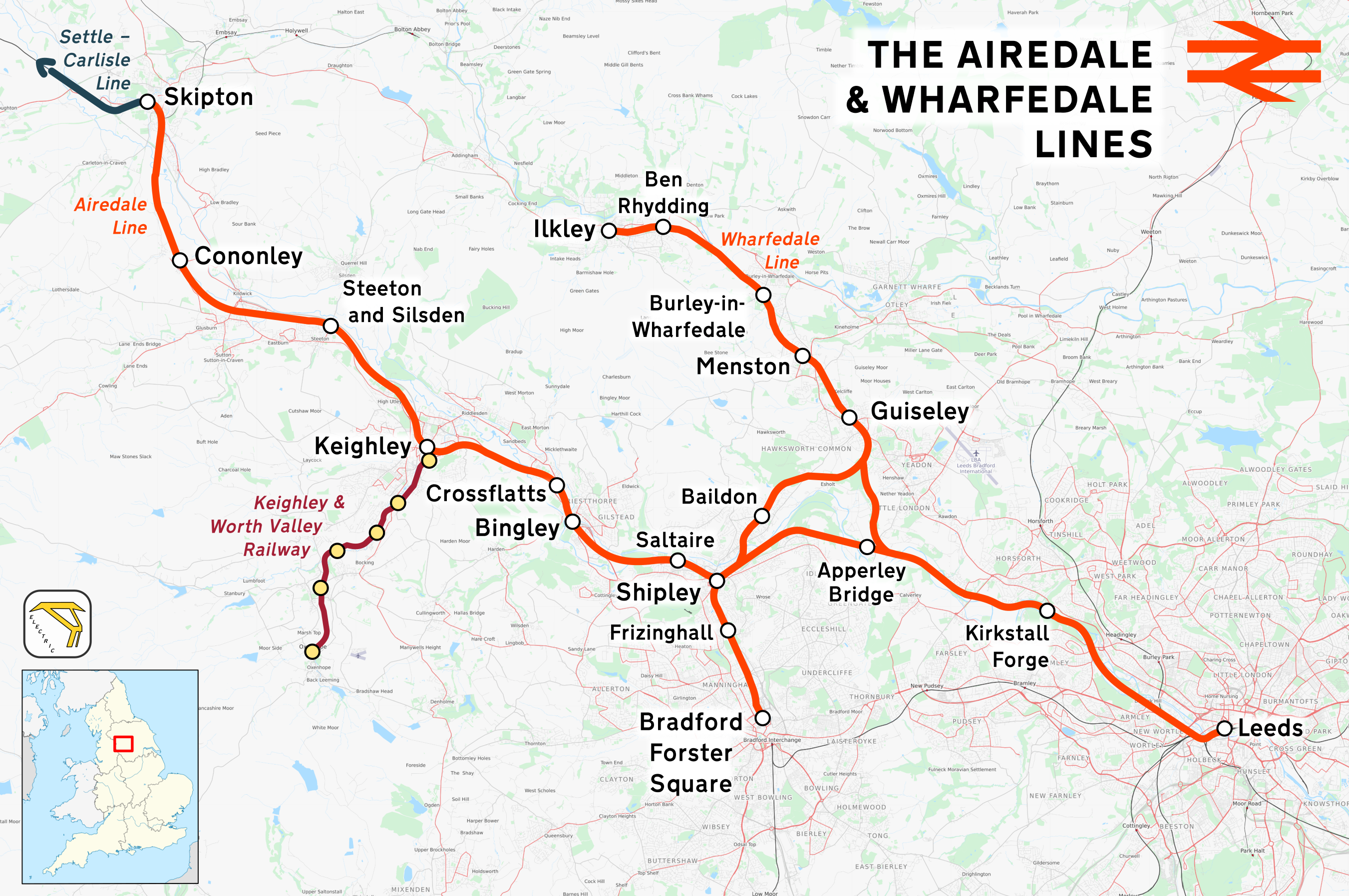
(Click to expand)

The Wharfedale line is one of the rail services in the West Yorkshire Metro area of northern England. The service connects Ilkley with Leeds and Bradford, and is operated by Northern Trains. West Yorkshire Metrocards are available for use on the line, covering Zones 3–5. The line is served predominantly by four-coach Class 333 electric multiple units as well as some three-coach Class 331 EMUs.

== The route ==
The line was originally owned by the Midland Railway from Leeds to Burley-in-Wharfedale. At this point the line became joint property, with the North Eastern Railway, and was known as the Otley & Ilkley Joint Railway (O&IJt). The two lines from Leeds and Bradford come together at Esholt Junction – the location of an 1892 crash – south of Guiseley.

The route from Leeds leaves the main line near Calverley and continues along the Aire valley until climbing a hill to:

- Guiseley railway station
- Menston railway station
- Burley-in-Wharfedale railway station
- Ben Rhydding railway station
- Ilkley railway station

A new station, Kirkstall Forge, opened in 2016 on the Aire Valley section of the route between Leeds and Guiseley. The station at Kirkstall Forge provides a service on the Wharfedale line outside of peak hours only. Plans also exist to reinstate the O&IJt branch line to Otley from Milner Wood Junction, between Menston and Burley.

The first section of the route from Bradford Forster Square is also used by the Airedale and Leeds–Bradford lines. The service to Ilkley branches north of Shipley railway station to:

- Baildon railway station a reopened station
- Esholt: station closed
- Esholt Junction for the line to Leeds.
- and on to Guiseley, Menston, Burley-in-Wharfedale, Ben Rhydding and Ilkley

The line was electrified throughout using 25 kV AC Overhead between 1994 and 1995 by British Rail. The now-closed and lifted Skipton-Ilkley line continued west of Ilkley via Addingham, Bolton Abbey and Embsay to Skipton. The section from Embsay to Bolton Abbey has been reopened by enthusiasts who operate steam locomotives as the Embsay and Bolton Abbey Steam Railway.
