= Ilkley railway station =

Railway station in West Yorkshire, England

Ilkley
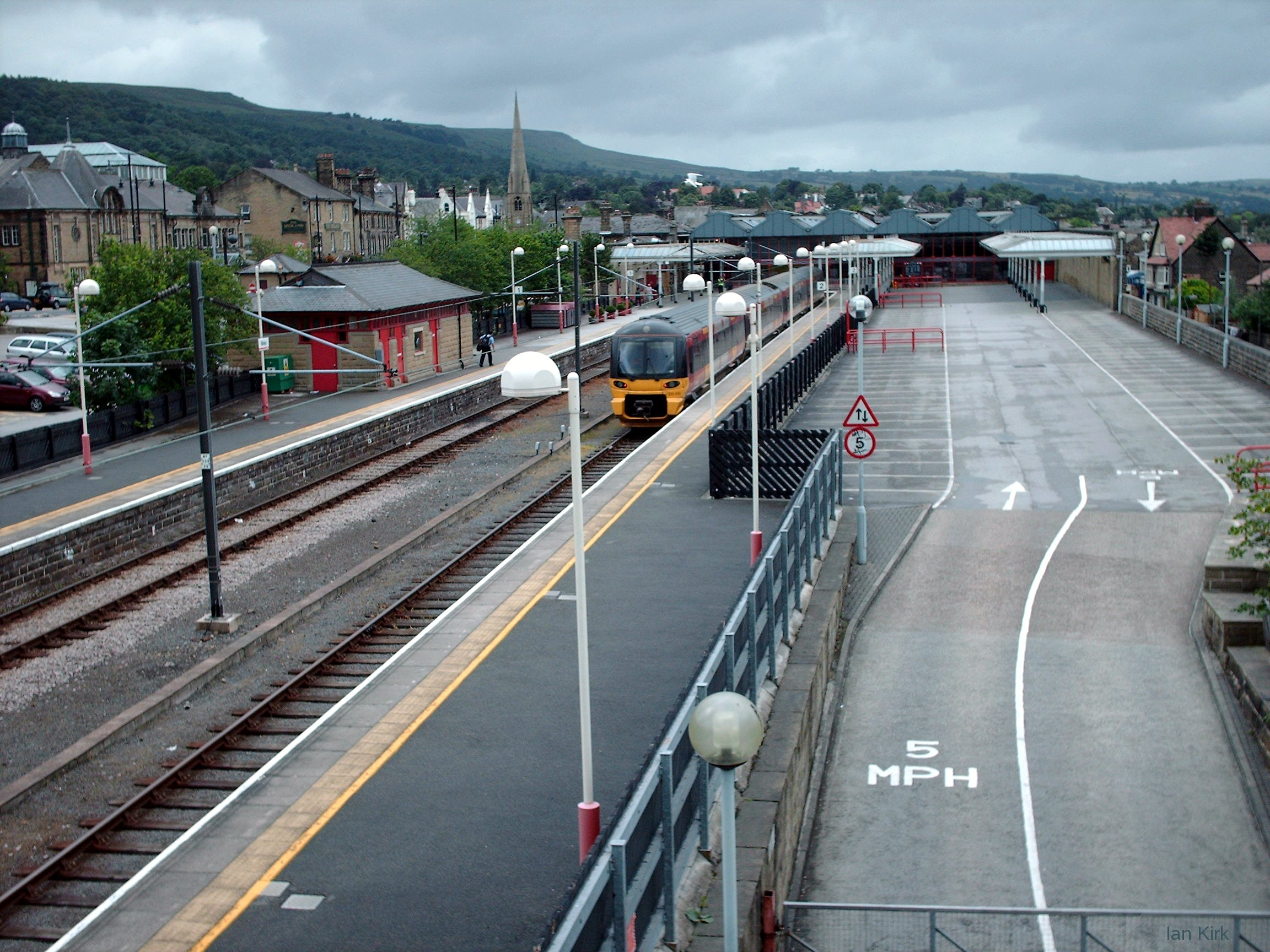
- The view from the footbridge

General information
- Location: Ilkley, City of Bradford, England
- Coordinates: 53.925°N 1.822°W
- Grid reference: SE117476
- Manager: Northern Trains
- Transit authority: West Yorkshire Metro
- Platforms: 2

Other information
- Station code: ILK
- Fare zone: 4
- Classification: DfT category D

History
- Opened: 1 August 1865

Passengers
- 2021/22: ▲0.937 million
- 2022/23: ▲1.119 million
- 2023/24: ▲1.176 million
- 2024/25: ▲1.358 million
- 2025/26: ▲1.444 million
Location
Notes
- Passenger statistics from the Office of Rail and Road

Ilkley railway station serves the town of Ilkley, in the City of Bradford, West Yorkshire, England. It is the northern terminus of the Wharfedale Line to Leeds and Bradford Forster Square. Northern Trains operates all services and manages the station.

== History ==
Ilkley station was opened in August 1865, as the western terminus of the Otley and Ilkley Joint Railway. (Note: The Midland and North Eastern railways.) The station buildings were designed by the chief architect to the Midland Railway, John Holloway Sanders. This railway offered two alternative routes to Leeds: either via Otley and the Leeds Northern/NER line through Headingley or via Guiseley, and the former Leeds and Bradford Railway along the Aire Valley. The Midland subsequently built a branch from the latter route to Shipley in 1876, to provide a direct line from the town to Bradford Forster Square. A milepost on the former platform 4 indicated that the station was 211.25 miles (339.97 km) from London St. Pancras.

A further extension of the line opened in 1888 to Skipton, via Addingham, Bolton Abbey and Embsay saw the station assume the status of a junction. Terminating trains only used the bay platform 1, as the lack of a facing crossover on the approach lines meant that platform 2 was not available as a terminating road. Platform 2 was only available as a departure road for trains that were first drawn back towards Ben Rhydding, and then shunted back into the bay. A carriage storage siding was originally provided between platforms 1 and 2, explaining the wide gap between the current lines in this location. The facing crossover was finally installed during the remodelling of the station approaches in 1983, thus allowing terminating trains to directly access platform 2.

The through lines were served by platforms 3 (in the down direction) and 4 (up). The lines continued through the back wall of the station and immediately crossed over Brook Street by way of a bowstring girder bridge with an 85-foot (25.9 m) span. This extension eventually fell victim to government cuts, following the publication of Dr Beeching's Reshaping of Britain's Railways report. It was closed to passengers in March 1965, at the same time as the route via Otley to Leeds, and to all traffic at the beginning of 1966, reducing Ilkley to a terminus once more.

The track alongside both platforms 3 and 4 remained in place for a time following closure as a through route, with platform 3 seeing occasional peak-time passenger use, and platform 4 very occasional engineering use as a stabling siding. The pedestrian subway leading from the main station concourse to platform 4 and the back entrance of the station on Railway Road was closed in 1983, owing to the deterioration of the glass roof above it. Much of the glass in the main roof at this side of the station was removed at this stage; platforms 3 and 4 were closed permanently and the track was lifted.

Goods traffic was catered for by a yard comprising nine sidings and three through roads situated on the south eastern side of the station, in the area now occupied by Tesco supermarket and car park. A large stone built shed and attached offices was situated on one of the through lines. A five-ton hand-cranked crane stood to the east of the shed. The yard closed for all freight except coal on 1 February 1965 and to all traffic on 7 August 1967. The last two wagons were removed on 9 August 1967, after which the yard sidings stood derelict until it was removed in the mid-1970s.

The original engine shed, dating from the opening of the line was on the site now occupied by the station car park. In a subsequent development, a two road engine shed and two coaling sidings, together with a 50-foot (15 m) turntable were provided on the northern side of the approach lines, and the original facility demolished. Local residents had complained to the railway owners about "black smoke" in the station area. The new shed was some distance below the main running lines and two reversals were required to access it. The Ilkley brewery building was also provided with a single 475-foot-long (145 m) siding that also served as the headshunt for access to the engine shed area. The shed itself closed in January 1959 with the introduction of diesel multiple units on passenger services.

In the late 1980s, the roofed area covering the western end of the station platforms was closed in and converted into a small supermarket; the lines were shortened by around 40 metres (131 ft) to make room for this alteration. The main station building was taken out of railway use and turned over to retail in May 1988. The area between former platforms 3 and 4 (the Skipton through lines) was infilled during electrification work and is now a car park. The vehicle ramp, leading up from Station Road, passes through the area once occupied by the coal drops at the eastern end of platform 4.

The line was electrified at 25 kV AC in 1995 and was initially worked by three-car Class 308 electric multiple units that were redeployed from Essex. The previous latticework footbridge - constructed by Andrew Handyside and Co. in 1909 - was demolished during electrification works and replaced with the present structure, which has solid sides to protect pedestrians from the overhead wires.

Ilkley is notable in that it was the last British Rail station to be lit by gas. The gas lights were extinguished for the last time on 8 May 1988.

== Facilities ==
In November 2011, a major refurbishment of the station was completed, which cost £625,000. This new upgrade included the construction of a brand new station building, with a ticket office, a heated waiting room and new shelters. New customer information screens, a comprehensive CCTV system and improved PA system were also installed, with new gates at the entrance of the station. There is a car park with 36 spaces, along with bicycle storage.

== Services ==
Northern Trains operates the following off-peak service pattern, in trains per hour (tph):

- 2 tph to Leeds
- 1 tph to Bradford (2 tph at peak times).

In the evenings and all day on Sundays, services are hourly to both Leeds and Bradford.

Preceding station	National Rail	Following station
Ben Rhydding	Northern Trains Wharfedale Line	Terminus
Disused railways
Addingham	Midland Railway Skipton to Ilkley Line	Terminus

== Gallery ==
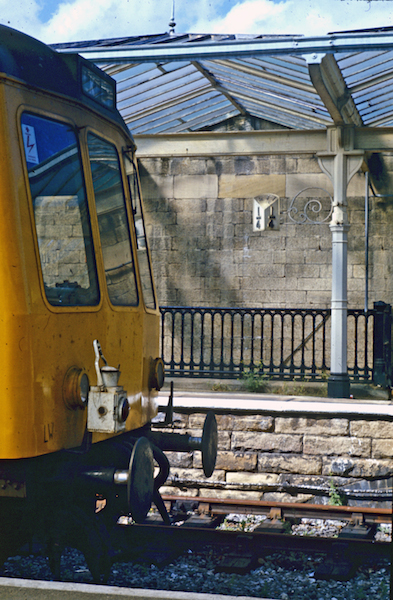
A DMU at Platform 3 in the 1970s

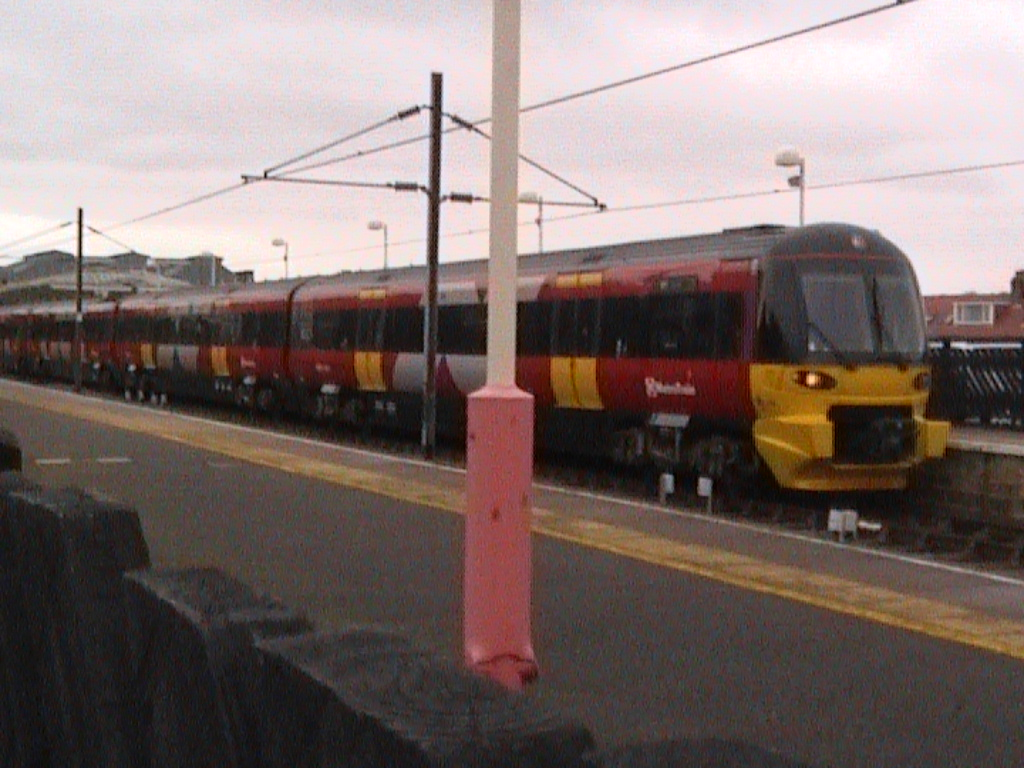
A train waits at platform 2 with a service for Leeds

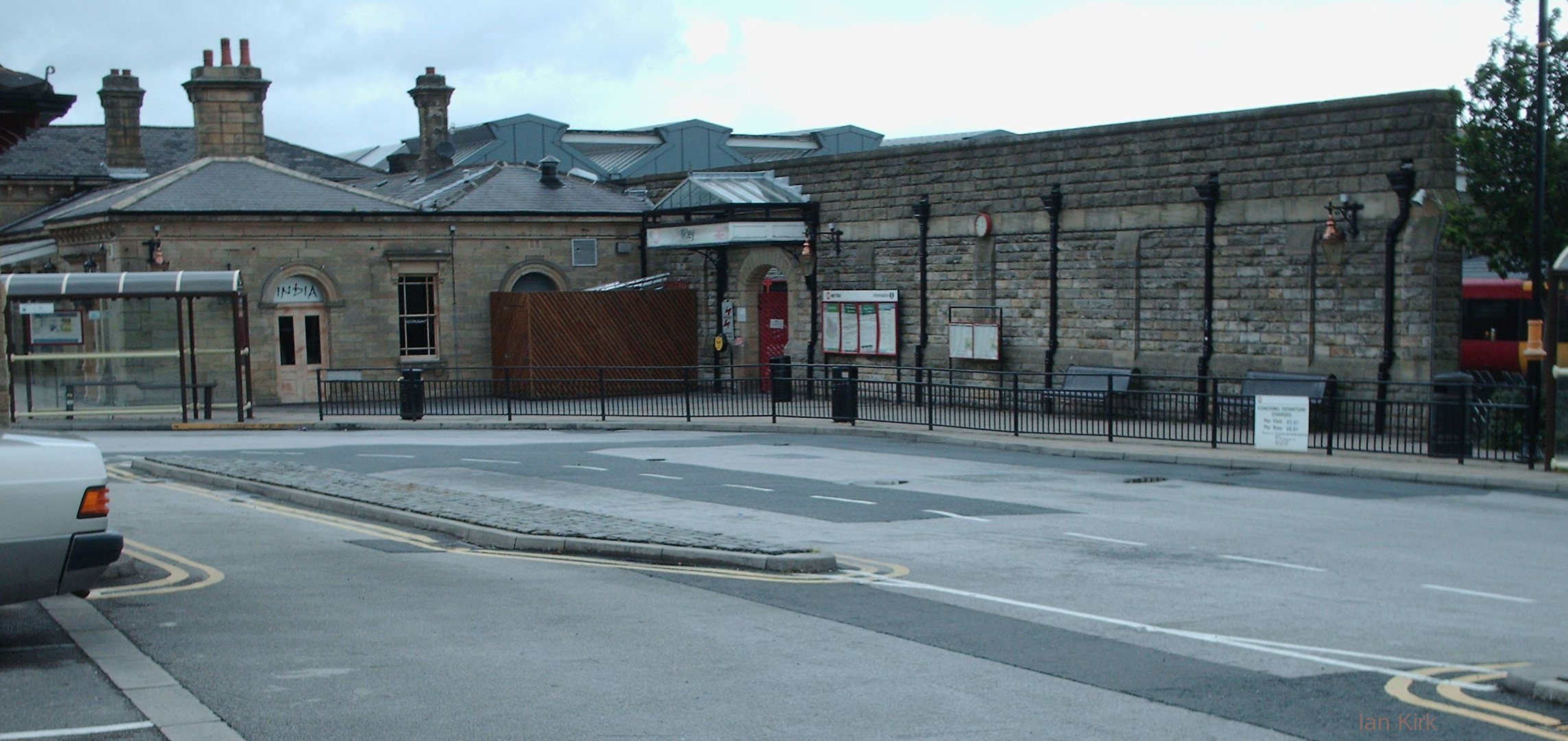
The station entrance

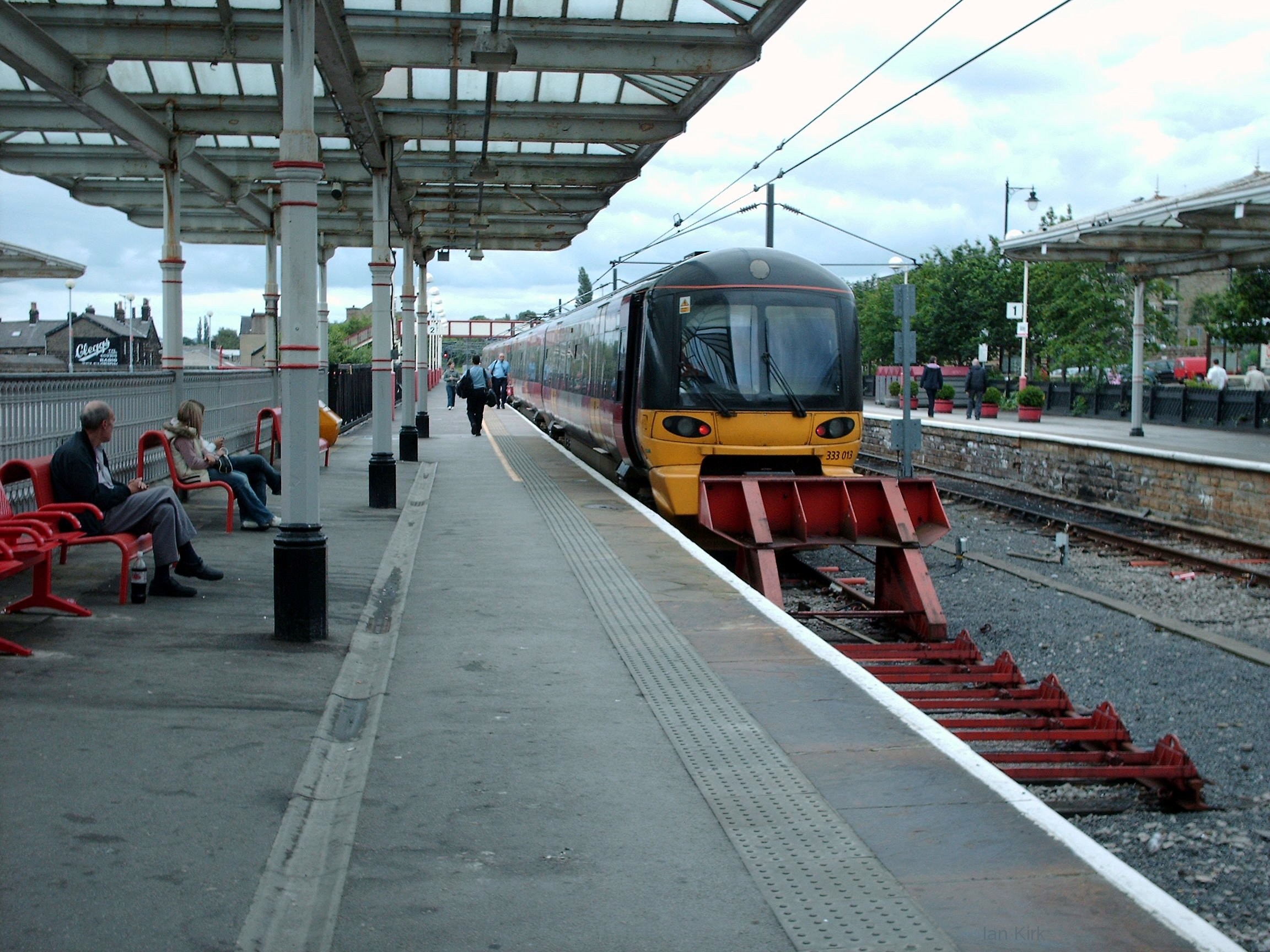
Platform 2

== See also ==
- Listed buildings in Ilkley
