= Otley and Ilkley Joint Railway =

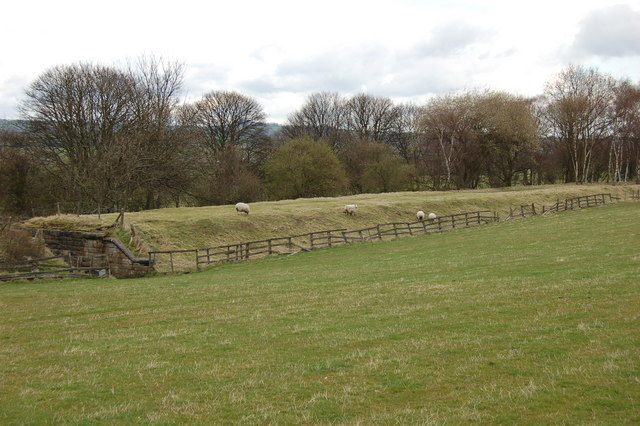
- Former railway between Otley and Pool in Wharfedale

Overview
- Status: partially closed
- Owner: Midland Railway, North Eastern Railway
- Locale: West Yorkshire
- Termini: Ilkley; Otley
- Stations: 4

Service
- Type: Heavy rail

History
- Opened: 1865
- Closed: 1965

Technical
- Line length: 6 1/2 miles (10 km)
- Track gauge: 4 ft 8 1/2 in (1,435 mm) standard gauge

The Otley and Ilkley Joint Railway was a railway line running between the towns of Otley and Ilkley in West Yorkshire. The line was managed and run jointly by the Midland Railway (MR) and the North Eastern Railway (NER) and was 6 1/2 miles (10 km) long. Opened to passenger traffic on 1 August 1865 and freight traffic some months later, the line ran for almost 100 years before partial closure in July 1965 when the line to Otley closed. Today passenger services run over the rest of the line as part of the West Yorkshire Passenger Transport Executive (WYPTE) Wharfedale Line.

== History ==
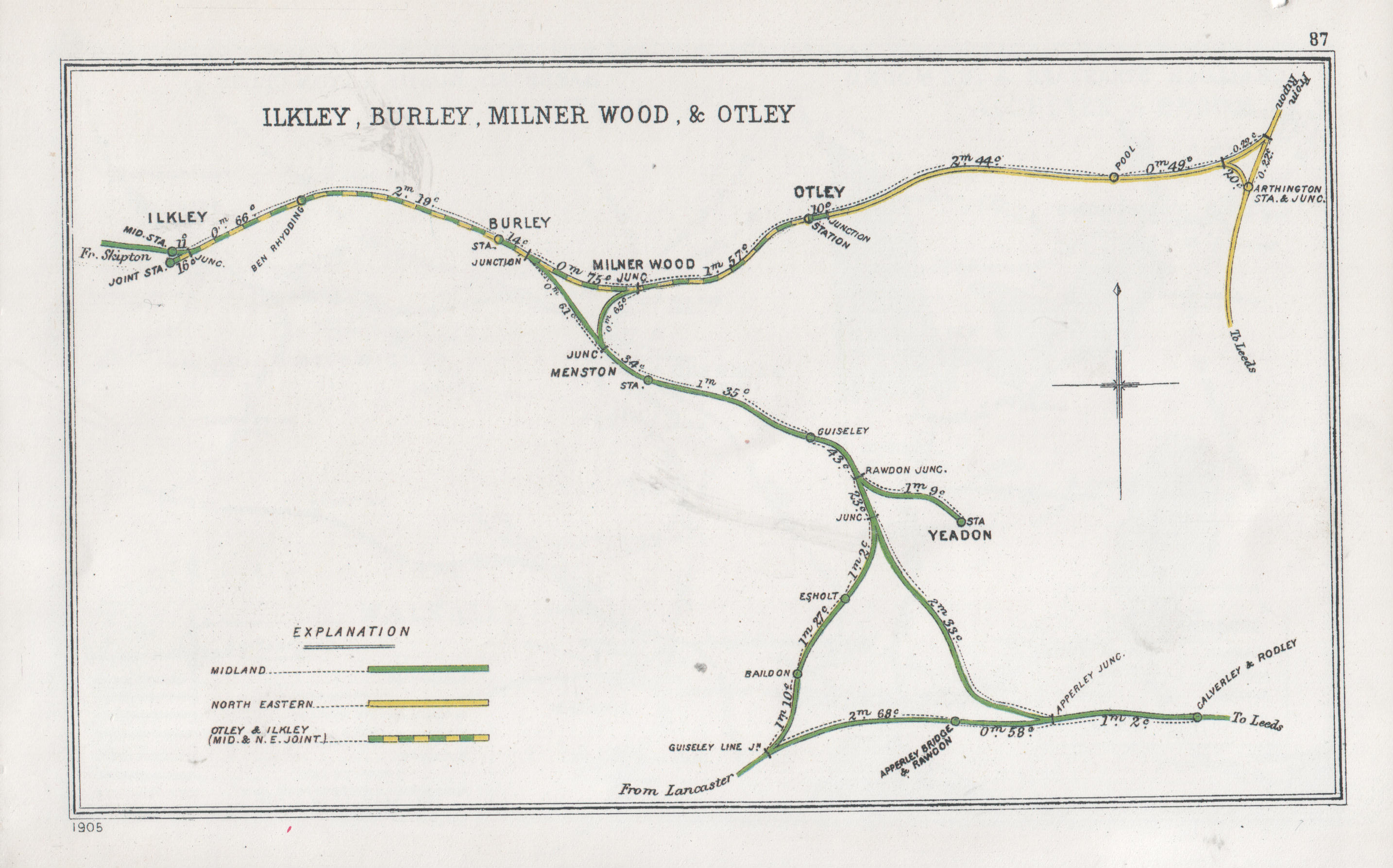
Railway Clearing House diagram of the line

The towns of Otley and Ilkley both lie in Wharfedale and the early railway schemes passed the valley by. An act of parliament had been obtained by the Lancashire & Yorkshire North Eastern Railway (incorporated as the Wharfdale [sic] Railway Company) in 1846 to build a line from Skipton through Ilkley and Otley to Arthington but the scheme failed as the company could not raise the necessary capital and was wound up in 1852.

A second proposal was made in 1856 for a company called the Wharfedale Railway to construct a line on the same route as that authorised in 1846, but the promoters of this scheme could get no support from the major companies (the MR and the NER) who operated the lines into which the Wharfedale Railway would connect.

Midland Railway (Otley and Ilkley Extension) Act 1861
- Act of Parliament
- Parliament of the United Kingdom
- Long title: An Act to enable the Midland Railway Company to make Railways from the Leeds and Bradford Line of their Railway to Otley and Ilkley in the West Riding of the County of York; and for other Purposes.
- Citation: 24 & 25 Vict. c. cxxxix

Dates
- Royal assent: 11 July 1861

North Eastern Railway (Extension to Otley, &c.) Act 1861
- Act of Parliament
- Parliament of the United Kingdom
- Long title: An Act to enable the North-eastern Railway Company to construct Branch Railways between Arthington, Otley, and Ilkley; and for other Purposes.
- Citation: 24 & 25 Vict. c. cxli

Dates
- Royal assent: 11 July 1861

Finally in 1860, following approaches from local representatives, the NER and the MR met and agreed to build a joint line between Otley and Ilkley. The Midland Railway would make a connection with the new line by building a branch from the Leeds to Bradford line at Apperley Bridge to a junction at Burley in Wharfedale and the NER would build a branch from its Leeds to Harrogate line at Arthington to make an end-on connection with the new line at Otley. The necessary legal powers were granted in 1861 with the passing of two acts; the Midland Railway (Otley and Ilkley Extension) Act 1861 (24 & 25 Vict. c. cxxxix) and the North Eastern Railway (Extension to Otley, &c.) Act 1861 (24 & 25 Vict. c. cxli). To obtain its act of Parliament the MR had to agree to demands from the residents of Bradford who felt aggrieved that with the construction of the line there would be two direct routes between Ilkley and Leeds (Ilkley—Guiseley—Leeds & Ilkley—Arthington—Leeds) and none between Bradford and Ilkley. The act therefore stated that "equal facilities and advantages as regards trains and the conveyance and accommodation of passengers on the Railway shall be afforded to or from Bradford as those to or from Leeds".

Construction began in 1863 with The MR taking responsibility for building the line between Otley and Ilkley. The NER branch from Arthington was finished first, and the first train from Otley to Leeds, via Arthington, ran on 1 February 1865. The MR line from Apperley Junction and the joint line itself were completed a few months later and the first passenger train from Ilkley to Otley ran on 1 August 1865, freight services starting a year later, in October 1866.

The need to provide no disadvantage to travellers to and from Bradford gave the Midland some problems as the journeys involved reversing trains at Apperley Junction. To alleviate this the Midland sought powers to build a further line from Guiseley Junction (near Shipley) to Esholt Junction (near Guiseley). The line opened in December 1876 and the NER quickly negotiated running powers over the new section of line. This allowed the NER to run trains from Harrogate to Bradford without going via Leeds.

A final through connection to the joint line was made when the Midland Railway opened its Skipton—Ilkley line in 1888.

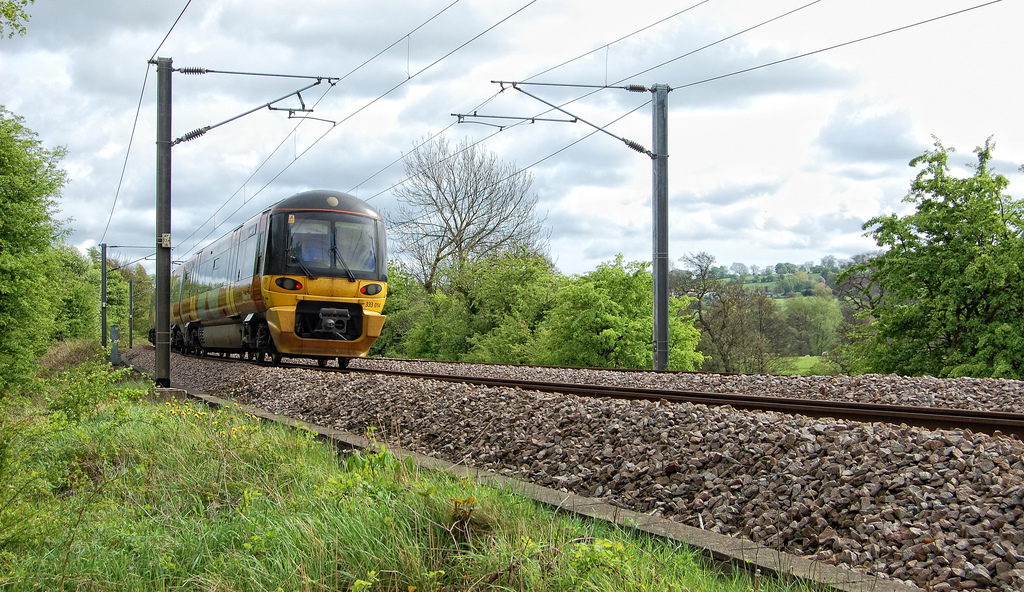
The northwestern node of Milnerwood junction connected the abandoned Otley branch to what is now known as the Wharfedale Line, which is still in use and supports modern day rail traffic

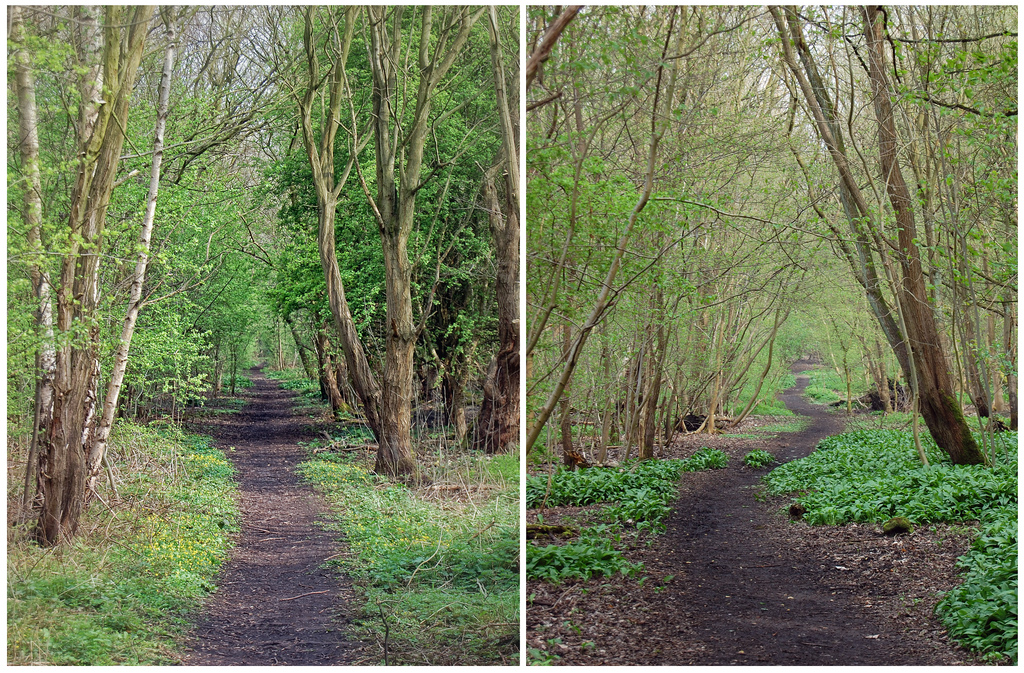
A footpath lined with trees marks the former railway route to the west of Otley, between what were the old Milnerwood and Burley Junctions

== Operation and traffic ==
The two companies set up a joint committee, the Otley & Ilkley Joint Line Committee, to manage the line. In the early days this led to some confusing arrangement e.g. east bound freight traffic for Leeds was sent on alternate weeks via Arthington and Apperley Junction to give fair distribution of income between the MR and the NER. Likewise signalling was to be maintained in five year periods alternating between the two companies, an arrangement swiftly done away with and instead an agreement made that the Midland would signal west of Burley Junction, and the North Eastern the line east of Burley Junction.

Throughout its life most of the passenger traffic on the line was of a local nature and passengers seeking to travel further afield than Leeds, Bradford or Harrogate would need to change trains.

North Eastern passenger services ran from Ilkley to Leeds via Otley, a slightly longer route than the Midland services which ran via Apperley Junction — 18.75 miles (30.18 km) via Otley compared to 16.5 miles (26.55 km) via Apperley Junction. By the time of the grouping there were six trains each way on weekdays between Ilkley and Leeds and also eight trains running between Harrogate and Bradford. Midland services comprised eight trains each way between Leeds and Ilkley and 11 trains between Ilkley and Bradford with 15 departures from Bradford to Ilkley, together with a limited number of trains between Otley and either Leeds or Bradford via Guiseley.

An exception to the "local trains only" operations was a through coach service that was available between Ilkley and London St Pancras between 1900 and 1914 but the service was discontinued at the outbreak of the First World War and was never reinstated.

After 1923 the line continued to be run on a joint basis by the London, Midland and Scottish Railway (LMS) and the London and North Eastern Railway (LNER) as the successors to the Midland and North Eastern companies. Weekday train services remained much the same and by 1935 there were eight services each way on the LNER route. LMS services consisted of 14 trains each way between Ilkley and Bradford (seven being through trains to/from Skipton) and nine between Ilkley and Leeds.

The Second World War had a dramatic effect on the line and even after the end of the war services were poor compared to pre-war levels. In April 1946 LNER direct services between Ilkley and Leeds had fallen to just one with a further six journeys possible by changing trains at Arthington. The Harrogate—Bradford service was reduced to two trains each way. LMS services were not much better with seven trains Ilkley—Bradford and six Ilkley—Leeds.

With nationalisation in 1948 there came an end to the joint committee and the entire line became part of the London Midland Region of British Railways although this was short lived and in 1955 it became part of the North Eastern Region instead. Neither event had much effect on train services and the 1957 timetable showed an improvement of services via Guiseley but only four trains each way through Otley (all Ilkley—Leeds services) and the withdrawal of the Bradford—Harrogate service altogether.

A major change came in 1959 when passenger services over the line were moved from steam hauled trains to Diesel multiple unit operation. The number of daily trains increased from 41 to 72 with hourly services between Ilkley—Bradford and Ilkley—Leeds via Guiseley, although the Otley service remained at four services each way.

== Decline and rescue ==
The increase in services had been welcomed but only four years later the entire line was threatened. Under the Beeching proposals all the lines in Wharfedale would close along with the lines via Guiseley. However, due to pressures from the Ilkley Railway Supporters Association (formed specially to fight the closure proposals) the Guiseley lines and the Burley—Ilkley section were reprieved. The line from Burley to Arthington was to close along with the line north of Ilkley to Skipton. The last passenger services on the Burley—Arthington line ran on 20 March 1965 and goods services ceased on 5 July 1965. Ilkley became a terminus again with the withdrawal of the final freight services between Skipton and Ilkley in January 1966 and the closed lines were demolished later that year.

The remaining lines were again threatened with closure in 1968 when a second closure proposal was made. The discussion went on until 1972 when it was announced that the Ilkley to Leeds service would survive but that the line between Guiseley and Shipley would close and once again trains between Ilkley and Bradford would have to reverse at Apperley Junction. The decision was however never implemented as Bradford Corporation agreed to subsidise the line. Since 1974 the line's funding has been managed by WYPTE and is now marketed as the Wharfedale line.

The trackbed between Burley in Wharfedale, Otley and Pool is to become a cycleway, footpath and equestrian route known as the Wharfedale Greenway, with possible extensions onward to Ilkley alongside the extant railway. Planning permission for the first phase of the greenway was granted in July 2020.

== Yeadon branch ==
Guiseley, Yeadon and Rawdon Railway Act 1890
- Act of Parliament
- Parliament of the United Kingdom
- Long title: An Act to Revive and Extend the Powers of the Guiseley Yeadon and Rawdon Railway Company for the Purchase of Land and the Completion of their Railway and for other purposes.
- Citation: 53 & 54 Vict. c. xxxi

Dates
- Royal assent: 22 May 1890

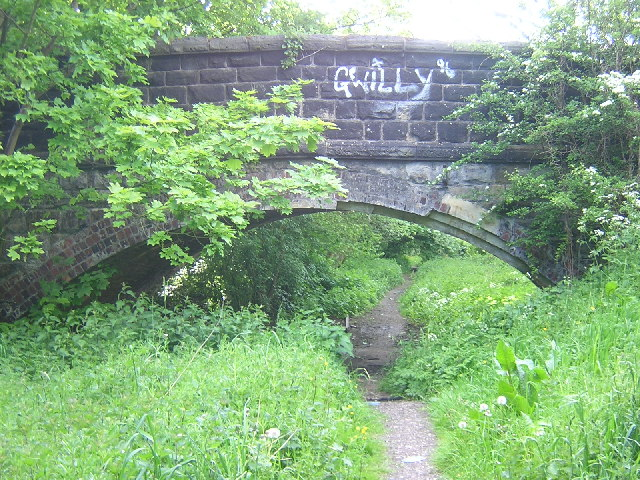
Former railway line between Guiseley and Yeadon under St Johns Road (2005)

Although not part of the Otley and Ilkley Joint line the branch to Yeadon arose from approaches made to the NER in 1881 to construct a line from Guiseley to Headingley via Yeadon. This would have shortened the journey between Ilkley and Leeds by three miles compared to the route via Otley. The NER did not wish to participate and instead the new Guiseley, Yeadon and Rawdon railway turned to the Midland Railway. Finding some favour the company obtained the Guiseley, Yeadon and Rawdon Railway Act 1885 (48 & 49 Vict. c. lxxvii) giving approval for a 1 mile (1.6 km) line from the Midland line south of Guiseley to Yeadon. Despite plans and powers in the act of Parliament to extend the line to Headingley, the company could not raise the necessary capital and the Guiseley—Yeadon section was sold to the Midland who opened the line to freight traffic only in 1894. Despite a station being built at Yeadon there was never a regular passenger service, only occasional excursions, and the line continued as a freight only line until it closed in 1964. The section of disused trackbed now forms part of the Aireborough Greenway.
