= Aire Valley Fault =

Geological fault in Yorkshire, England

Coordinates: 53.8673°N 1.9081°W

The Aire Valley Fault (also known as the Keighley Fault) is an inactive strike slip fault in Yorkshire, England. It is considered a northwestern continuation of the Morley-Campsall Fault Belt and extends northwards from the Huddersfield and Wakefield area into the South Craven fault. It is connected to the Denholme Clough Fault.

The fault runs underneath Keighley bus station and the Airedale Shopping Centre, and has caused cracks in the shopping centre.
