= Keighley Bus Company =

Transdev-owned bus operator

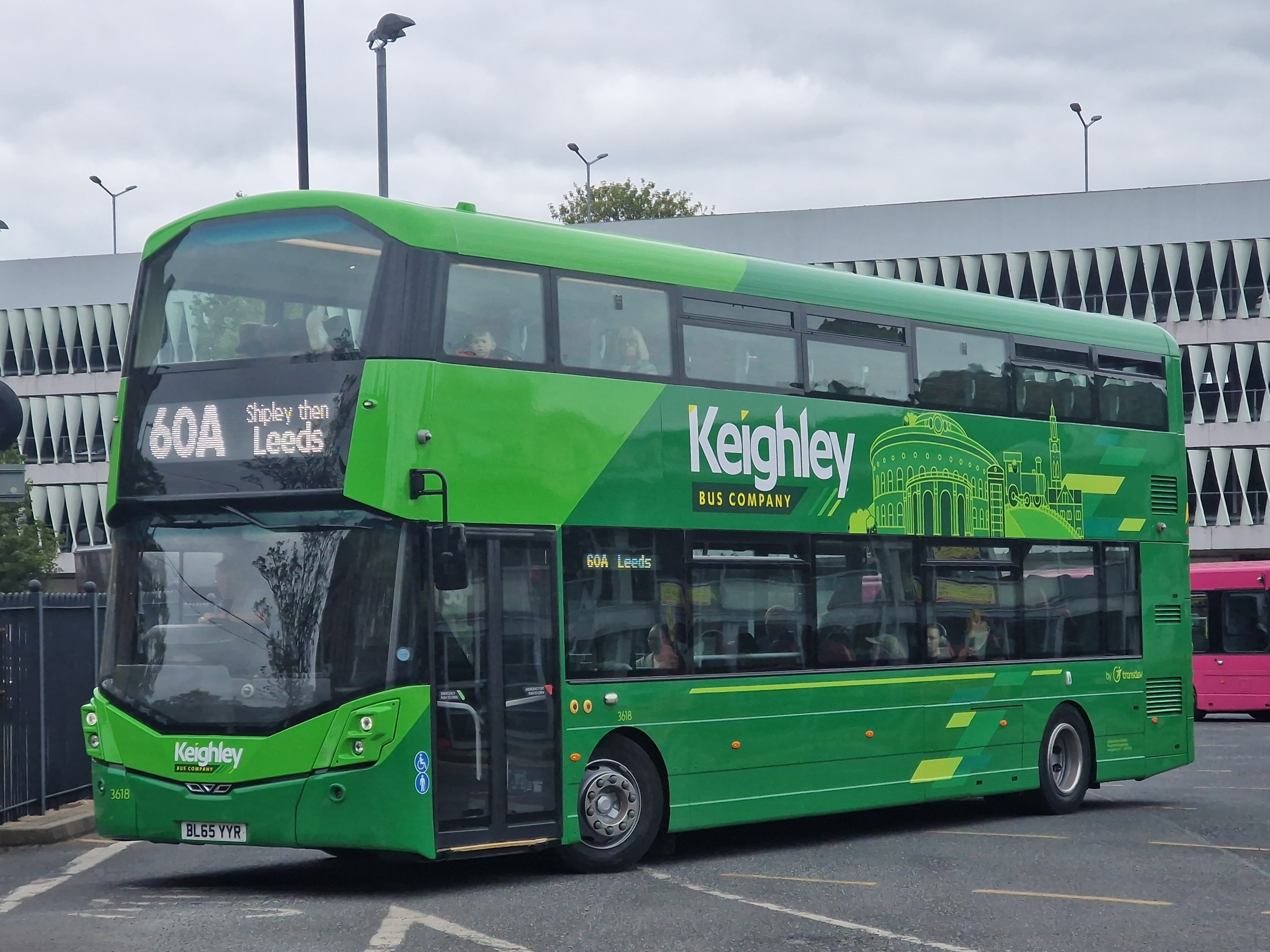
- Wright Gemini 3 bodied Volvo B5TL at Keighley bus station in May 2025
- Parent: Transdev Blazefield
- Headquarters: Harrogate, North Yorkshire; England
- Service area: West Yorkshire
- Service type: Bus and coach
- Stations: Keighley Bus Station
- Depots: 2
- Fleet: 125 (at July 2021)
- Managing Director: Henri Rohard
- Website: transdevbus.co.uk/the-keighley-bus-company/

Keighley Bus Company operates both local and regional bus services in West Yorkshire, England. It is a subsidiary of Transdev Blazefield.

== History ==
When founded, the company was part of Tilling & British Automobile Traction. In 1927, following the company's expansion, Tilling & British Automobile Traction was renamed West Yorkshire Road Car Company, to reflect the wider service area provided.

In 1948, along with other companies that were then part of the Tilling Group, West Yorkshire Road Car Company was nationalised.

In 1968, West Yorkshire Road Car Company became a subsidiary of the National Bus Company.

In September 1987, AJS Group purchased West Yorkshire Road Car Company from the National Bus Company. The business was subsequently split into smaller companies, one of which became Keighley & District Travel.

In August 1991, Keighley & District Travel was included in the purchase of AJS Group by Blazefield Group, following the sale of seven of the company's eight remaining bus firms at the time – a deal valued at £2.2 million.

In January 2006, French-based operator Transdev acquired the Blazefield Group, along with 305 vehicles.

In 2010, the company was rebranded under the name Transdev in Keighley.

In July 2016, the company was again rebranded, now operating as The Keighley Bus Company.

In 2025, the branding was changed to "Keighley Bus Company", dropping the "The" prefix.

== Services and branding ==
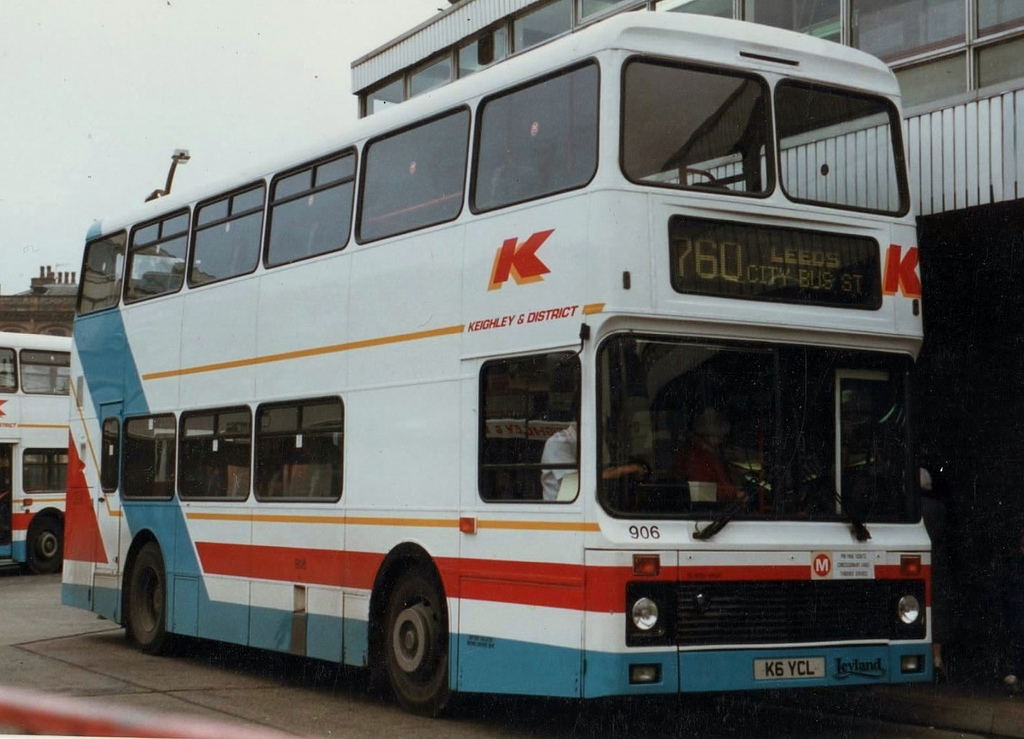
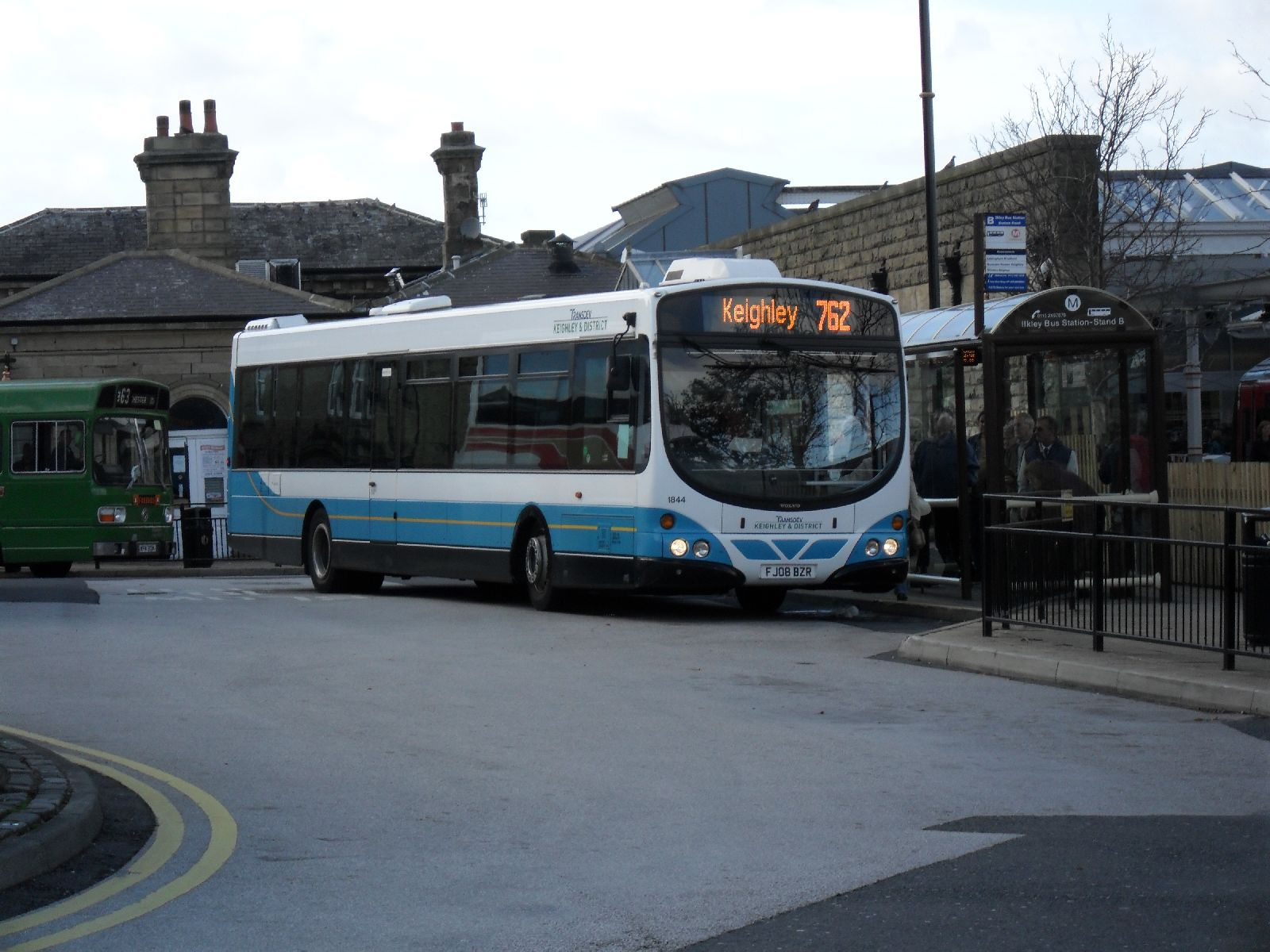
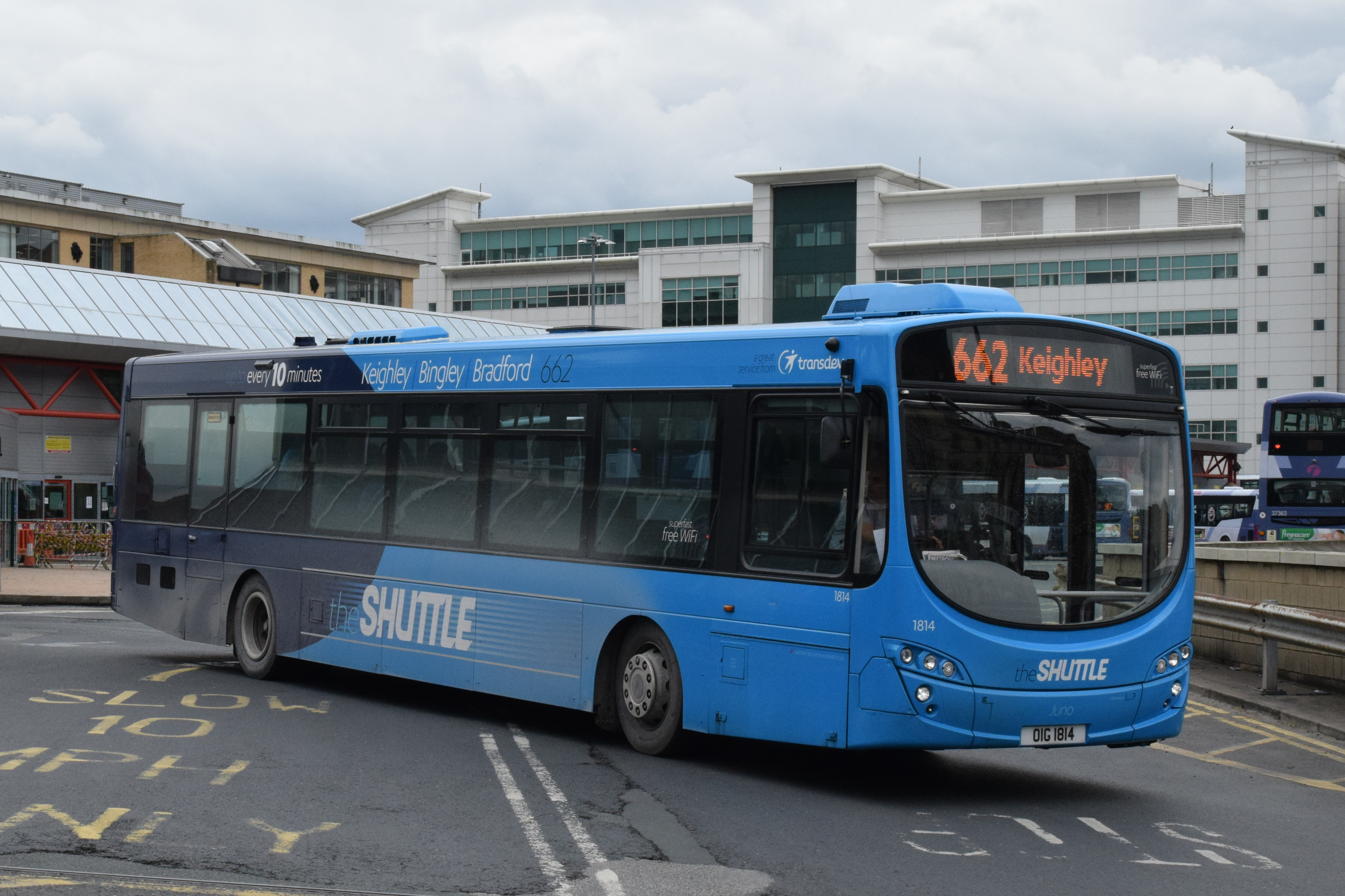
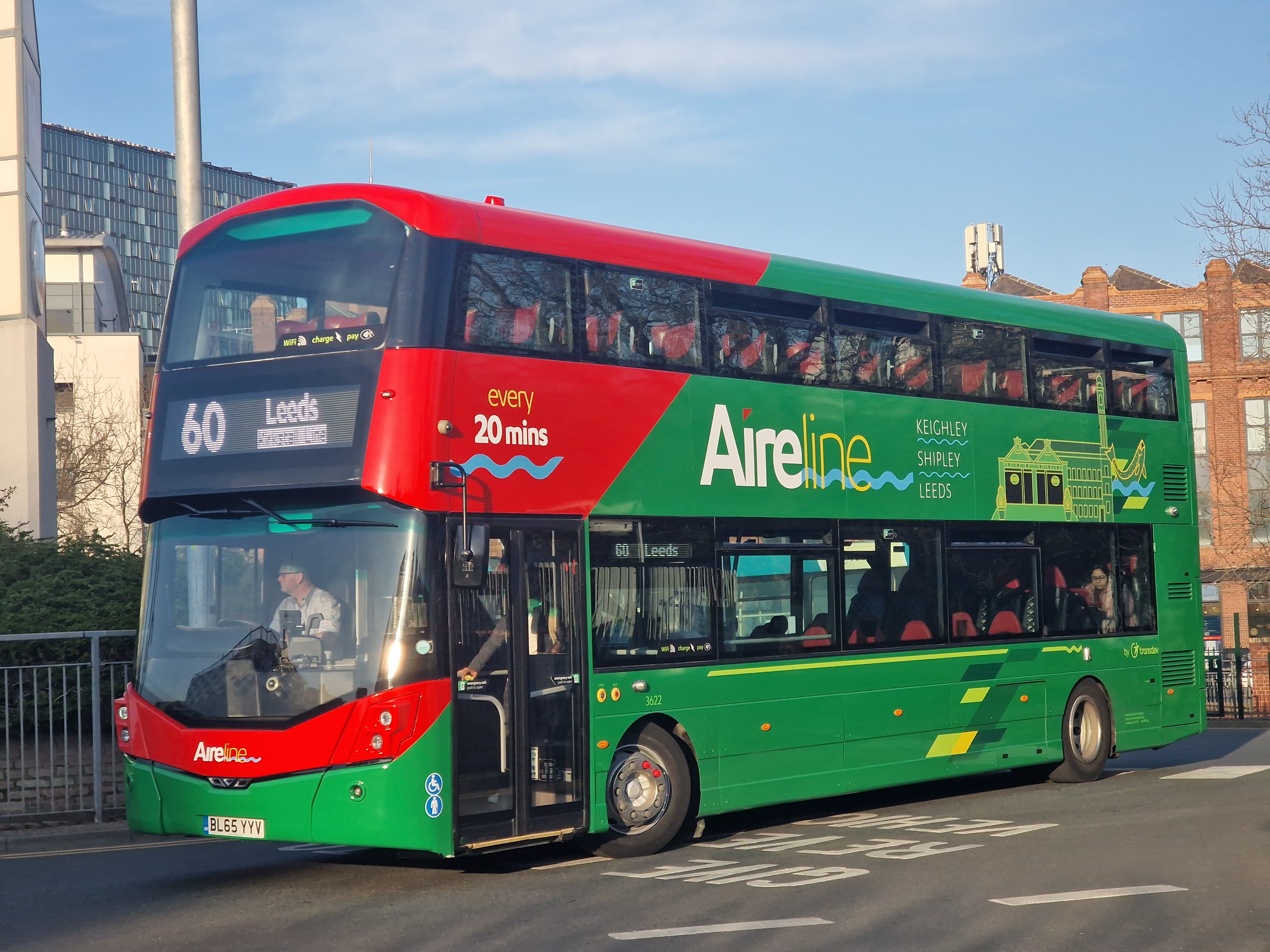
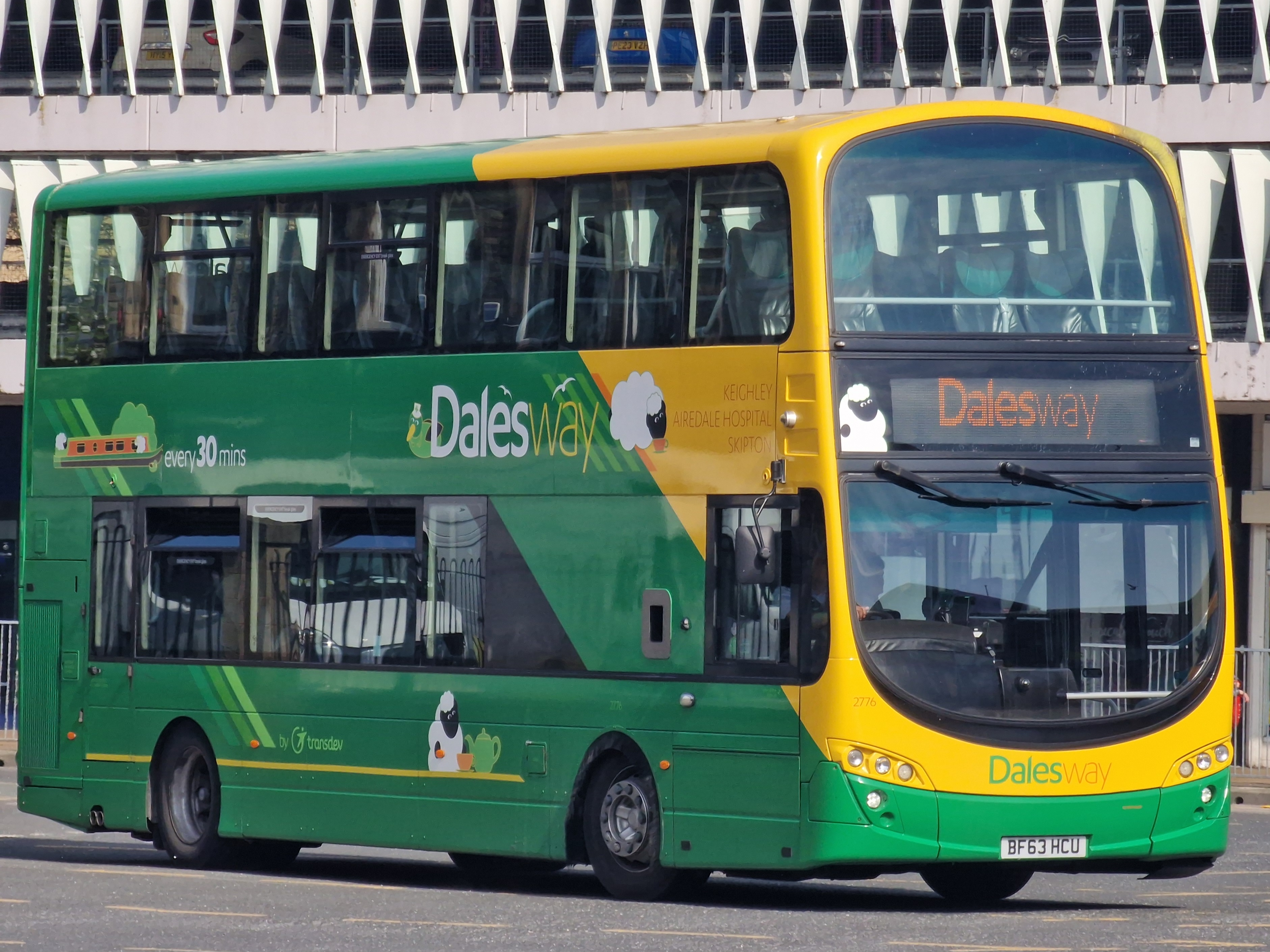
Branding: past and present

=== The Keighley Bus Company ===
The process of rebranding to The Keighley Bus Company commenced in July 2016, which saw the introduction of a two-tone green livery, as well as the investment of in the region of £2 million in new vehicles. A number of local bus services operate under this brand, including services 62 (Ilkley and Keighley), 67 (Bradford and Keighley) and 72 (Grassington and Skipton). The two-tone green livery is also used as a base for other brands, including Brontë Bus and Keighley Jets.

=== Aireline ===
The Aireline brand is used on service 60, which operates between Leeds and Keighley via Rodley, running along the route of the River Aire. The service is now operated by a fleet of Volvo B5TL/Wright Eclipse Gemini 3 double-deck vehicles, branded in a red and green livery. Features include free WiFi, USB charging and audio-visual next stop announcements. The service was previously operated by Optare Versa single-deck vehicles, which were introduced in October 2017 and later Volvo B9TL Wright Eclipse Geminis from 2020. As of 2023, service 60A was introduced to run alongside the 60 and serve parts of Farsley which the 508 no longer serves.

=== Brontë Bus ===
The Brontë Bus brand encompasses three services, which operate at a combined frequency of up to every 20 minutes between Haworth and Keighley. Services then extend hourly to Stanbury (B1), Oakworth (B2) and Hebden Bridge (B3). The service is operated by a fleet of Volvo B7RLE/Wright Eclipse 2 facelifted single-deck vehicles, branded in a two-tone green livery. Features include free WiFi and USB charging. The service was previously operated by a fleet of Wright StreetLite DF Micro Hybrid single-deck vehicles, which served the route between May 2015 and May 2017.

=== Dalesway ===
The Dalesway brand is used on service 66, which operates between Keighley and Skipton. The service is currently operated by a fleet of Volvo B5TL/Wright Eclipse Gemini 3 double-deck vehicles, replacing Volvo B9TL Wright Eclipse Gemini 2s that were previously branded for the route. Features include free WiFi, USB charging and next stop audio-visual announcements.

In February 2021, Dalesway was permanently upgraded to a double-deck vehicles, following an increase in passenger numbers prior to the COVID-19 pandemic. Prior to the upgrade, the service was operated by a fleet of Optare Versa single-deck vehicles, which were introduced in September 2016.

=== The Shuttle ===
The Shuttle brand used to operate on service 662, which runs between Bradford and Keighley via Shipley. Until November 2025, the service was managed with a fleet of Wright Eclipse Urban-bodied Volvo B7RLE single-deck vehicles, which had been painted in various liveries over the years. Initially, the buses featured a two-tone red-and-white design. Around 2010, they were repainted into a butterscotch-and-blue colour scheme. In 2015, the fleet underwent refurbishment, receiving the new Eclipse 2 front end and a fresh two-tone blue livery. Notable features of these buses included free WiFi and USB charging ports. The last bus in the original batch, 1814 YJ05 KHO, was initially delivered in the standard Keighley and District livery but was eventually repainted in a green and blue Transdev livery for Keighley. In 2015, this bus was finally branded along with the other shuttle vehicles. This particular bus has now been preserved by Joshua Davis and is the only shuttle vehicle to receive preservation status.

In October 2023, Transdev announced that the route would be converted to battery-electric buses through a £7.5 million order for 15 Mercedes-Benz eCitaro single-deck buses, partially funded by the UK Government's Zero Emission Bus Regional Areas (ZEBRA) scheme. These buses entered service around October–November 2025. These buses are painted up in the current Keighley Bus Company green and lack any Shuttle branding. They still feature subtle branding on the inside and on the destination displays, but it is now just SHUTTLE.

== Former Services and Branding ==
=== Keighley Jets ===
The Keighley Jets brand encompassed a total of seventeen local bus services, which operated in and around the market town of Keighley. Services were operated by a fleet of Mellor Strata minibuses and Optare Solo single-deck buses, which were branded in a two-tone green livery. Features include free WiFi, USB power and audio-visual next stop announcements. Though there has not been any official announcement from the company, the Keighley Jets branding has been retired from its fleet, though the routes still maintain their K prefix and features mentioned above.

=== Otley Dash ===
In October 2017, the company took over operation of service 965 (Otley and Weston) from First Leeds. (Note: Prior to this date, The Keighley Bus Company operated evening and Sunday services.) Initially encompassed under the Wharfedale Links brand, the service was rebranded Otley Dash in March 2021. It was operated by Optare Solo single-deck vehicles, branded in a two-tone cream and green livery. On 19 February 2023, the company's services on Otley Dash came to an end when the contract for the tender ended. The tender for the route was then awarded to Connexionsbuses, however evening and Sunday journeys are run by sister company Flyer's route A3.

=== Wharfedale Links ===
In October 2016, the company gained the contract for services 963 (Holt Park and Wharfedale Hospital), 966 (Guiseley and Yeadon) and 967 (Leeds Bradford Airport and Menston), which operated under the Wharfedale Links brand. The services were operated by a fleet of Optare Solo single-deck vehicles, branded in a two-tone cream and green livery. As of 2022, the Wharfedale Links brand consisted of the services 948 (Eccleshill to Apperley Bridge), 962 (Otley to Burley in Wharfedale then Ilkley) and 966.

On 19 February 2023, the company's services on Wharfedale Links came to an end when the contracts for the tenders ended. The tender for the 962 was awarded to Connexionsbuses, and an off-peak replacement service for the 966 started operation by Squarepeg on 6 March. The 948 was suspended.

== Fleet and operations ==
=== Depots ===
As of April 2022, the company operates two depots in the market town of Keighley. (Note: Depots are located at Marriner Road and Suresnes Road.)

=== Vehicles ===
As of April 2022, the fleet consists of in the region of 125 buses. The fleet consists of diesel-powered single and double-deck buses manufactured by Optare, Wrightbus, and Plaxton, as well as minibuses manufactured by Mellor.
