= Denholme Clough Fault =

Small fault in Denholme, England

Coordinates: 53°47′45.6″N 1°53′10.4″W

The Denholme Clough Fault is a small fault located in Denholme, Northern England. The fault is approximately 500 metres (1,600 ft) long. The fault has produced no appreciable earthquake history, but it is still subject to stresses that may cause it to slip. The maximum earthquake arising from a slip of this fault has been estimated to be below magnitude 3. The Denholme Clough Fault is part of the Pennines anticline and is partially visible from the surface.

The fault starts at Leeming alongside another and together the two faults merge and run across Thornton Moor, through Denholme and own towards Huddersfield where it is known as The Bailiff Bridge Fault. The throw of the fault (its Vertical displacement) is as much as 500 feet (150 m) across Thornton Moor.

== Geological significance ==
The Denholme Clough Fault forms part of a complex fault system that influenced sedimentation patterns during the Carboniferous Period, particularly the Namurian stage (approximately 326–315 million years ago). The fault shows a northwest–southeast trend and forms a graben structure with the Aire Valley Fault to the northeast. This structural configuration played a pivotal role in controlling depositional environments and sediment distribution during the early Marsdenian substage of the Namurian, as evidenced by detailed sequence stratigraphic analyses of the Millstone Grit Group in this region. Sedimentological studies indicate that the graben formed between the Denholme Clough Fault and the Aire Valley Fault acted as a conduit for fluvial systems, with palaeocurrent indicators suggesting a southeasterly flow direction along the axis of the graben. The term "R2b3 sequence" denotes a particular package of sediments laid down during the early Marsdenian substage of the Namurian. In this interval, braided river channels were funnelled directly into the graben formed between the Denholme Clough Fault and the Aire Valley Fault, concentrating fluvial fairways in that structural corridor.

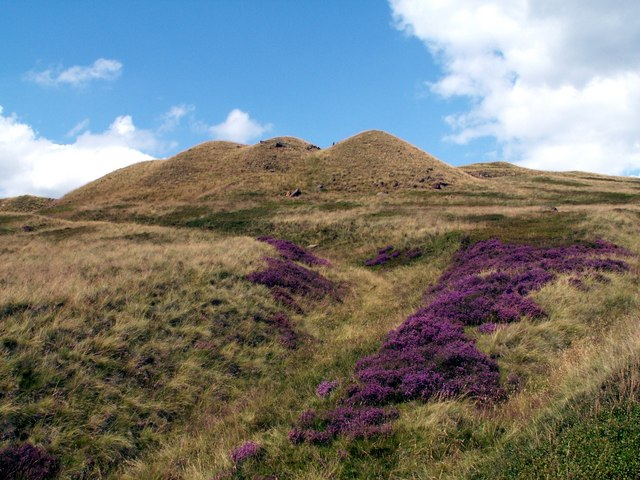
Cock Hill Quarry

At several sites, evidence shows that the Denholme Clough Fault was active while sediments were being laid down. At Cock Hill Quarry, arcuate sets of cross-cutting faultlets within the East Carlton Grit suggest at least two episodes of syn-depositional faulting during the R2b2 sequence. Similarly, disturbed bedding features at Bingley Road Quarry within the Woodhouse Flags of the R2b3 sequence exhibit liquefaction-style flame and ball structures that may represent sediment liquefaction triggered by seismic activity associated with movements along the fault system. The fault also influenced accommodation space and depositional thickness patterns across the region, with apparent thinning of the R2b3 sequence observed in the vicinity of the Denholme Clough Fault footwall at localities such as Nan Scar Clough, suggesting that differential subsidence across the fault controlled sediment accumulation rates.

The fault played a major role in controlling the distribution of certain distinctive lithological units, particularly the Keighley Bluestone. This indurated and brittle purple to dark grey silty mudstone, characterised by abundant Zoophycos bioturbation and Hyalostelia sponge spicules, is geographically restricted to the fault block between the South Craven–Aire Valley Fault System to the northeast and the Denholme Clough Fault to the southwest, south of the intersection of these strike-slip faults with the Pendle lineament. The restricted occurrence of the Keighley Bluestone has been interpreted as indicating the presence of a horst block elevated at the time of deposition, demonstrating how the Denholme Clough Fault contributed to creating localised depositional environments during the Carboniferous. The fault thus represents an important structural element that influenced the complex interplay between tectonics, eustasy and sedimentation in the Pennine Basin during the late Carboniferous.

== Sources ==
- Evans, DJ; Walker, ASD; Chadwick, RA (2002). "The Pennine Anticline, northern England - a continuing enigma?". Proceedings of the Yorkshire Geological Society. 54 (1): 17–34. doi:10.1144/pygs.54.1.17.
