= Listed buildings in Otley =

Otley is a civil parish in the metropolitan borough of the City of Leeds, West Yorkshire, England. It contains 152 listed buildings that are recorded in the National Heritage List for England. Of these, one is listed at Grade I, the highest of the three grades, two are at Grade II*, the middle grade, and the others are at Grade II, the lowest grade. The parish contains the market town of Otley and the surrounding countryside. Most of the listed buildings are in the town, and consist of houses, cottages and associated structures, shops, public houses, and commercial buildings. The other listed buildings include churches, chapels and items in churchyards, farmhouses and farm buildings, buildings associated with a former mill, public buildings, schools, milestones, former workhouse buildings, a clock tower, a war memorial and garden, and telephone kiosks.

== Key ==
Grade	Criteria
I	Buildings of exceptional interest, sometimes considered to be internationally important
II*	Particularly important buildings of more than special interest
II	Buildings of national importance and special interest

== Buildings ==
Name and location	Photograph	Date	Notes	Grade
All Saints' Church; 53.90407°N 1.69460°W		Late 11th century (or earlier)	The church was altered and expanded during the centuries. It is in stone, and consists of a nave with a clerestory, north and south aisles, a south porch, north and south transepts, a chancel, and a west tower. The oldest parts of the church are windows in the chancel and a re-set north doorway, all in Norman style. The windows in the aisles and the large east window are in Perpendicular style, and the aisles and tower have embattled parapets. The tower also has a clock face on the east front and a small lead-covered wooden spire.	I
18–24 Beech Hill; 53.90523°N 1.69568°W		17th century (probable)	A row of shops in stone, with two storeys, and a roof kneeler on the left. In the ground floor are two doorways in architraves and modern shop fronts. The upper floor contains mullioned windows, one window with three lights, and three windows with two lights.	II
67 and 69 Bondgate; 53.90390°N 1.69155°W		17th century (possible)	A pair of houses dating mainly from the 19th century. They are in stone and have a stone slate roof with a kneeler on the left. On the front are two shop windows, and the other windows are mullioned with two lights.	II
2 and 4 Boroughgate; 53.90584°N 1.69347°W		17th century	A house, later divided and used as a library and council office, and since then for other purposes. It is in stone, with a string course, and a stone slate roof with a coped gable and kneeler. There are two storeys and four bays. In the ground floor is a modern shop front on the left, two doorways, and two windows. The left doorway has pilasters and a cornice, and the other doorway has a plain architrave. The windows are sashes with architraves. The lower part of the right house has carved decoration with volutes.	II
1 and 2 Church Lane; 53.90452°N 1.69514°W		17th century	A house, later divided, in millstone grit on a rendered plinth, that has a stone slate roof with coped gables and kneelers. There are two storeys, and on the front are two doorways, one with an architrave and a fanlight. There are three windows in each floor, all casements, one with an architrave and a keystone. At the rear is a projecting wing containing a mullioned window with a hood mould.	II
103 and 105 Cross Green; 53.90669°N 1.68607°W		17th century	A farmhouse, later altered and divided, it is in stone, and has a stone slate roof with coped gables and kneelers. There are two storeys, and each house has two bays. The windows in the right bay of No. 103 have two lights, pilasters and cornices, and the ground floor sill is on brackets. The other windows in both houses have single lights and keystones. The doorway of No. 103 has a decorative architrave with engaged columns and a keystone, and the doorway of No. 105 has a plain surround and is attached to a window on the right.	II
19 Crow Lane; 53.90371°N 1.68994°W		17th century	A stone house with a stone slate roof, two storeys and two bays. The doorway has an architrave, one window has a stone lintel, and the other lintels are in wood.	II
38 Market Place; 53.90539°N 1.69389°W		17th century	A stone shop with a blue slate roof, three storeys and two bays. In the ground floor is a modern shop front and a passage doorway, and the upper floors contain sash windows, one in the middle floor and two in the top floor. At the rear are mullioned windows with three lights.	II
19 Sugar Street; 53.90453°N 1.69211°W		17th century	The oldest part of the house is the gable end facing the street, the rest was rebuilt later. The house is in stone with a stone slate roof, two storeys and three bays. The doorway has an architrave, and the windows are mullioned.	II
Black Bull Public House; 53.90542°N 1.69344°W		17th century	A house, later a public house, it is in stone, the front roughcast, and with a blue slate roof. There are two storeys, three bays, and outbuildings at the rear. The doorway has a moulded surround, and the windows are mullioned, with two or three lights.	II
Rose and Crown Public House; 53.90411°N 1.69204°W		17th century	The public house, which was later altered, is in stone on a plinth, partly rendered, and has a Welsh slate roof with coped gables and kneelers. There are two storeys and two bays. Above the central doorway is an inserted elliptical window, and the other windows have two lights.	II
Stubbings Farmhouse and barn 53.90020°N 1.66388°W	—	17th century (probable)	The farmhouse is in stone with a stone slate roof and two storeys. The windows are mullioned, and the doorway has a plain surround. The barn is to the left.	II
33 Ilkley Road; 53.90378°N 1.70172°W		Late 17th century	A stone house with a stone slate roof, two storeys and five bays. The doorway has a panelled surround and a fanlight, and the windows are sashes with splayed surrounds.	II
9 Courthouse Street and barn 53.90626°N 1.69326°W		c. 1700	A house and a barn, the barn divided into two, in one range. They are in stone with a stone slate roof. The house has two storeys, and contains mullioned windows. In the barn are a blocked window, a modern three-light window, and a blocked arched doorway.	II
The Old Hall; 53.90537°N 1.69438°W		c. 1700	A house, later used for other purposes, it is in millstone grit with a moulded eaves cornice, a parapet with a projecting balustrade over the middle bay, and a stone slate roof. There are three storeys and a symmetrical front of five bays. In the ground floor is a modern shop front. Above this, the middle bay projects slightly and contains a round-arched window with a moulded head and jambs, over which is a canted oriel window. In the middle floor are sash windows with alternating triangular and segmental pediments, and the top floor contains cross windows.	II*
65 Bondgate; 53.90391°N 1.69179°W		17th or 18th century	A shop that was altered in the 19th century, it is in stone and the gable end with kneelers faces the road. The gable end contains a shop front in the ground floor and an oriel window above. In the right return are a doorway and windows, all with architraves.	II
101 Cross Green; 53.90663°N 1.68622°W		Late 17th or early 18th century	A stone house with a stone slate roof, two storeys and two bays. The right bay contains a two-storey three-light canted bay window, and in the left bay is a doorway with a window above, each in an architrave.	II
22 and 24 Bondgate; 53.90409°N 1.69190°W		1737	A stone house with a stone slate roof, later incorporated into a public house. There are two storeys and three bays. The windows and doorway have stone surrounds, and to the right of the doorway is a small dated and initialled bay window.	II
6 and 6A Kirkgate; 53.90516°N 1.69408°W		1744	A pair of shops, at one time a public house, in stone with bands, and a stone slate roof. There are three storeys and four bays. In the ground floor are modern shop fronts, and the upper floors contain windows with stone surrounds. In the centre of the top floor is an initialled datestone.	II
58 and 60 Boroughgate; 53.90595°N 1.69056°W		1749	A stone shop with a stone slate roof, two storeys and two bays. In the ground floor is a modern shop front and two doorways with architraves, and on the right is a passage entry. In each floor are two windows with architraves, and at the rear is a date panel.	II
7 Beech Hill; 53.90575°N 1.69515°W		18th century	A stone shop with a stone slate roof, three storeys and two bays. The ground floor contains a modern shop front, In the upper floors, the windows in the left bay have a single light, and those in the right bay have three lights.	II
9 Beech Hill; 53.90569°N 1.69528°W		18th century	A shop, at one time a public house, in stone with a stone slate roof. There are two storeys and two bays. In the ground floor is a central doorway flanked by shop windows. The upper floors contain two-light windows in architraves; those in the middle floor are sashes. At the rear is a cobbled yard, and a former stable and brewhouse.	II
3 Bondgate; 53.90399°N 1.69358°W		18th century	A stone shop with a stone slate roof, two storeys, and one bay. In the ground floor is a doorway and a bow window, and the upper floor contains a sash window with a stone surround.	II
9 Bondgate; 53.90398°N 1.69340°W		Mid 18th century	A stone shop at the end of a row in stone, with two storeys and one bay. In the ground front is a doorway and a modern shop front, and the upper floor contains a window with an architrave.	II
26 and 28 Bondgate and 1 Wesley Street; 53.90409°N 1.69173°W		18th century	At one time a public house, later an office, it is in stone, the left return rendered, with a stone slate roof, and a kneeler on the left. There are two storeys and two bays. In the ground floor are a doorway, a window and a shop front, and the upper floors contain sash windows with stone surrounds.	II
30 Bondgate; 53.90408°N 1.69168°W		18th century	A stone shop with a stone slate roof, three storeys and one bay. In the ground floor is a modern shop front with a rendered surround, and the upper floors contain a casement window in each floor.	II
32, 34 and 38 Bondgate; 53.90407°N 1.69149°W		18th century	A row of stone shops with a stone slate roof, three storeys and four bays. In the ground floor are modern shop fronts, and the upper floors contain windows, most of which are mullioned with three lights.	II
42 Bondgate; 53.90407°N 1.69129°W		18th century	A shop in stone, with three storeys and two bays, the left bay taller. In the ground floor is a modern shop front.	II
Garden alcove, 6 Boroughgate; 53.90606°N 1.69288°W	—	18th century	The alcove is in stone and built into a brick wall, It consists of a semicircular arch with a keystone.	II
7–13 Boroughgate and 7 Market Place; 53.90564°N 1.69284°W		18th century	A row of stone shops with a stone slate roof and two storeys. In the ground floor are modern shop fronts, the upper floor contains four windows with architraves, and in the right return is a mullioned window and a sash window.	II
8 Boroughgate; 53.90584°N 1.69298°W		18th century	A stone house with string courses, and a stone slate roof with kneelers. There are three storeys and a symmetrical front of five bays. The central doorway has Tuscan columns, a semicircular fanlight with radial glazing bars, a frieze, and a pediment.	II
36 and 38 Boroughgate; 53.90588°N 1.69175°W		18th century	A block of houses on a corner site, later used for other purposes, it is in stone on a plinth, with string courses, and a stone slate roof. There are three storeys, six bays on the front, and three bays on the left return. The two doorways have fanlights, and the windows are sashes.	II
44 and 46 Boroughgate; 53.90591°N 1.69110°W		18th century	A pair of shops in stone with a stone slate roof, and two storeys. In the ground floor are three doorways and two shop fronts, one with a bowed centre. In the upper floor are three windows; all the openings have architraves.	II
56 Boroughgate; 53.90595°N 1.69072°W		18th century	A house later used for other purposes, it is in stone on a plinth, with string courses, a moulded eaves cornice, a parapet, and a stone slate roof. There are three storeys and three bays. The central doorway has an architrave and a rectangular fanlight, the windows on the front have one or two lights, and at the rear is a mullioned window.	II
64 Boroughgate; 53.90596°N 1.69049°W		18th century	A shop in painted stone with a stone slate roof, two storeys and an attic, and one bay. The ground floor contains a shop window and a doorway, in the upper floor are two windows, and the attic has a modern dormer.	II
25 Clapgate; 53.90626°N 1.69395°W		18th century	A stone shop with a band, three storeys and two bays. The gable end with kneelers faces the road. In the ground floor is a modern shop front, and above are two windows in each floor.	II
27 Clapgate; 53.90628°N 1.69389°W		18th century	A shop in stone with a stone slate roof, two storeys and two bays. The ground floor projects and contains a late 19th-century shop front, and in the upper floor are two casement windows.	II
2 Courthouse Street; 53.90639°N 1.69348°W		18th century	A shop at the end of a row, it is in stone with a stone slate roof and a kneeler on the right. There are three storeys and two bays. In the ground floor is a modern shop front, and the upper floors each contain two windows.	II
1–5 Cross Green; 53.90570°N 1.68981°W		18th century	A row of shops and houses on a corner site on a plinth, in stone, partly rendered, with a stone slate roof and a kneeler on the left. There are two storeys, six bays, and two bays on the right return. The doorways have fanlights and the windows are casements, all with architraves, and there is a modern shop front.	II
25 Cross Green; 53.90567°N 1.68895°W		18th century	A stone house with a stone slate roof set back from the adjacent houses, it has sill bands, three storeys and three bays. The central doorway has an architrave, a three-light fanlight and a keystone. The windows have plain surrounds, those in the ground floor with keystones.	II
29 Cross Green; 53.90570°N 1.68886°W		18th century	A stone house with three storeys, two bays, and a modern two-bay extension extending at the front. The windows are casements.	II
36 Cross Green; 53.90628°N 1.68835°W		18th century	A shop in painted stone with a stone slate roof, two storeys and two bays. On the front are two doorways, the left with a stone architrave, and the right with a stone lintel. The windows also have architraves; those in the ground floor are shop windows.	II
63–69 Cross Green; 53.90630°N 1.68722°W		18th century	A row of four cottages in stone with a stone slate roof. There are two storeys, and each cottage has one bay. The doorways are paired and modern with architraves, and the windows are mullioned with three lights.	II
21 Crow Lane; 53.90370°N 1.68978°W		18th century	A stone house that has a stone slate roof with chamfered gable copings and kneelers. There are two storeys and three bays. The doorway has moulded jambs, and a shaped initialled and dated lintel. The windows in the middle bay are mullioned.	II
35 Ilkley Road; 53.90373°N 1.70186°W		18th century	A stone house with a stone slate roof, coped gables and kneelers. There are three storeys and two bays. The central doorway has an architrave, a fanlight, and a keystone. The windows in the lower two floors have architraves, keystones and moulded sills, and the top floor they have architraves but are plainer.	II
Former barn between 39 and 41 Ilkley Road; 53.90367°N 1.70215°W		18th century	The barn, later used for other purposes, is in stone and has a stone slate roof with coped gables and kneelers. It contains a tall entry with a chamfered surround, partly blocked and with an inserted door. The windows are small, some with chamfered surrounds, and one with an architrave.	II
41 and 43 Ilkley Road; 53.90363°N 1.70239°W		18th century	A pair of houses that were refronted in the 19th century, they are in stone with a stone slate roof. There are two storeys and each house has two bays. The doorways and windows have plain surrounds, and the doorways have fanlights.	II
4 Kirkgate; 53.90522°N 1.69409°W	—	18th century	A small shop with a single bay in a row of larger shops, in stone with a stone slate roof. It contains a modern shop front, and above is part of an upper storey.	II
11 and 13 Kirkgate; 53.90545°N 1.69439°W		18th century	A pair of rendered shops with a sill band, a stone slate roof, and three storeys. In the ground floor are modern shop fronts, and in the upper floors, No. 13 has one window in each floor, and No. 13 has two, all in architraves.	II
19 Kirkgate; 53.90530°N 1.69437°W		18th century	A stone shop with three storeys and two bays. In the ground floor is a modern shop front, and the upper floors contain sash windows with architraves.	II
50–54 Kirkgate; 53.90434°N 1.69382°W		18th century	A row of shops in painted stone with a Welsh slate roof, hipped on the left. There are two storeys and three bays. In the ground floor are modern shop fronts, and the upper floor contains three-light mullioned windows.	II
8, 8A and 10 Manor Square; 53.90617°N 1.69481°W		18th century	A house later used for other purposes, it is in stone with a stone slate roof. There are two storeys and three bays. The windows and doorways have architraves. In the ground floor is a modern shop front, two doorways and a window, and the upper floor contains three windows.	II
11 Manor Square; 53.90606°N 1.69440°W		18th century	At one time a bank, and later a shop, the front dates from the 19th century. There are two storeys and one bay. In the ground floor is a modern shop front, and the upper floor contains an ornamental three-light oriel window.	II
12 and 14 Manor Square; 53.90629°N 1.69475°W		18th century	A pair of shops in stone with a tile roof. There are two storeys and attics, and three bays. In the ground floor are modern shop fronts, the upper floor contains three windows, and above are modern dormers.	II
13 Manor Square; 53.90608°N 1.69441°W		18th century	A stone shop with a stone slate roof, two storeys and one bay. In the ground floor is a modern shop front, with a single window above.	II
2 Market Place and 2 Manor Square; 53.90580°N 1.69430°W		18th century	A shop on a corner site, it is rendered, and has a stone slate roof with a kneeler. There are three storeys, three bays on Manor Square and one on Market Place. In the ground floor is a modern shop front. The upper floors contain windows with architraves, including a Venetian window on the Market Place front.	II
6–12 Market Place; 53.90555°N 1.69300°W		18th century	A shop in rendered stone with a stone slate roof and kneelers. There are two storeys, and the windows have architraves, one of which is a sash window, and another a modern shop window.	II
16 and 18 Market Place; 53.90583°N 1.69368°W		18th century	A house, later two shops, in rendered stone, with two storeys and an attic, and three bays. In the ground floor are two modern shop fronts. The upper floor contains three windows with moulded architraves, the central window also with a cornice. At the top is a pedimented gable containing a semicircular window with two mullions in the tympanum.	II
22 and 24 Market Place and 1A Boroughgate; 53.90562°N 1.69340°W		18th century	A pair of shops on a corner site in stone, the right return rendered, with a kneeler on the left. There are three storeys and three bays. In the ground floor is a modern shop front, and the upper floors contain windows, some blocked, and include an oriel window in the middle floor.	II
36 Market Place; 53.90540°N 1.69380°W		18th century	A stone shop with a Welsh slate roof, three storeys and two bays. In the ground floor is a modern shop front, and the upper floors contain sash windows.	II
1 Mercury Row; 53.90443°N 1.69381°W		18th century	The building is in painted stone with two storeys. In the ground floor are two doorways with architraves and three windows, and the upper floor contains two windows.	II
3 and 5 Mercury Row; 53.90444°N 1.69363°W		18th century	A pair of shops in stone with two storeys. They contain modern shop fronts and windows with architraves.	II
27 New Market; 53.90461°N 1.69321°W		18th century	A house later used for other purposes, it is in stone with a stone slate roof and a kneeler. There are two storeys and three bays. The doorway has a rectangular fanlight, and the windows have architraves.	II
East Chevin Farmhouse and outbuildings 53.89159°N 1.66763°W		18th century	The farmhouse, at one time an inn, is in stone with a stone slate roof and kneelers. There are two storeys and two bays. The central doorway and the windows, which are mullioned with two lights, have architraves. The farm buildings are from a similar date, and are in the same materials.	II
Former stables, farm buildings and walls, Manor House; 53.90636°N 1.69497°W		18th century	The former stables and farm buildings are in stone, they have stone slate roofs with kneelers, and surround a cobbled courtyard. The ends are pedimented, the buildings contain Diocletian windows, and the area is enclosed by boundary walls.	II
Midgeley House Farmhouse and outbuildings 53.90492°N 1.66396°W	—	18th century	The house is in stone and has a stone slate roof with coped gables and kneelers. There are two storeys, two bays, and a single-storey extension on each end. The doorway has an architrave, and the windows are mullioned. The main outbuilding is a barn with a blocked segmental arch, and in its gable end is a dovecote with an arched window and an initialled and dated keystone. There are also two stable blocks, and the remains of a semicircular gin gang.	II
Former New Inn; 53.90538°N 1.69365°W		18th century	The building, at one time a public house, is in stone, with a moulded eaves cornice, and a stone slate roof. There are three storeys and three bays. The right two bays contain three-storey canted bay windows, and between them is a doorway. In the left bay is a flat carriage arch with windows above, and at the rear are two-storey former stables.	II
Newall Hall; 53.91098°N 1.69581°W		Mid 18th century	A small country house in stone, with two storeys and an attic, and five bays. In the centre is a portico flanked by canted bay windows. The upper floor contains five windows, the middle one with a pediment. At the top of the house is a giant pediment containing three windows, the middle window with a semicircular head; all the windows have architraves.	II
Old Post Office; 53.90593°N 1.69090°W		18th century	A house, later used for other purposes, it is in stone with string courses and a blue slate roof. There are three storeys and cellars, and a symmetrical front of three bays. In the centre is a doorway with rusticated quoined jambs and a triple keystone, above which is a Venetian window and, in the top floor, a Diocletian window. The outer bays contain two-storey rectangular bay windows, and in the top floor are two-light windows.	II
Former Ring of Bells Public House; 53.90433°N 1.69314°W		18th century	The public house, which was later refronted, is in stone with a stone slate roof. There are two storeys and a front of three bays, and the doorway and windows on the front have architraves. In the right return is a string course, a moulded eaves cornice, and three windows with moulded architraves.	II
Former Royal Oak Public House; 53.90644°N 1.69394°W		18th century	A house on a corner site, at one time a public house and later used for other purposes, it is in stone, partly rendered, on a plinth, with a slate roof. There are two storeys, five bays facing Clapgate, the right two bays gabled, and two bays on Bridge Street. The main doorway has moulded jambs, and a segmental moulded pediment with the name of the public house and oak foliage carved in the tympanum.	II
Silver Mill Complex; 53.89952°N 1.68439°W	—	18th century	The buildings associated with the former wool mill consist of the mill building, a house, and a row of three cottages, all in stone. The mill building is partly roughcast and has a stone slate roof and three storeys. The doorways have architraves, the windows have plain surrounds, and there is one original sash window. The house has a stone slate roof, two storeys at the front and three at the rear. The windows have architraves, on the front is a canted bay window, and at the rear are a mullioned window and an oriel window. The doorway has a rectangular fanlight. The cottages have three storeys, a slate roof, and the windows have architraves.	II
Throstle Nest Farmhouse; 53.91306°N 1.71288°W	—	18th century	The farmhouse is in stone, with sill bands, and a stone slate roof with coped gables and kneelers. There are three storeys and two bays. The doorway and windows have architraves, some of the windows are sashes, and some have mullions.	II
Outbuildings, Throstle Nest Farm; 53.91310°N 1.71334°W	—	18th century	The outbuildings are in stone, they have stone slate roofs with kneelers, and the doors and windows have architraves. One building to the west of the farmhouse and at right angles to the road contains an arched entry with voussoirs, and the other building near the southwest corner of the house has two storeys and a flight of steps leading to a doorway in the upper floor.	II
Former Vaults Public House; 53.90583°N 1.69356°W		18th century	The public house, later used for other purposes, is in stone with a string course, an eaves cornice, a parapet, and a stone slate roof with a coped gable and kneeler on the right. There are two storeys and three bays. In the ground floor, from the left is a passage entry, a former pub window with four lights, a fascia and a cornice, a doorway with an architrave and a fanlight, and a window. The windows are sashes with architraves.	II
Former Woolpack Public House; 53.90432°N 1.69333°W		18th century	The public house, later used for other purposes, is stuccoed, with a painted plinth and a stone slate roof. There are two storeys and two bays. The doorway has an architrave, and the windows are sashes.	II
Yew Tree Public House; 53.91322°N 1.69749°W		18th century	The public house was created from a block of older buildings, and was later extended. It is in millstone grit with stone slate roofs. The left part is modern, with a single storey, the middle section dates from the 18th century and has two storeys and two bays. In the right bay is a two-storey canted bay window, and in the left bay is a doorway with a circular window above. The right part dates from later in the 18h century, and contains windows in architraves, and at the rear is a 20th-century extension.	II
5 and 7 Bondgate; 53.90400°N 1.69349°W		1753	A house, later used for other purposes, it is in stone with a moulded string course, a stone slate roof, and two storeys. The main doorway has an architrave and a keystone, and above it is a moulded stone inscribed with initials and the date. The other doorway has a fanlight, and in the upper floor are windows with architraves, one with a keystone. The front is paved with cobblestones.	II
11 and 13 Sugar Street; 53.90437°N 1.69211°W		1755	A pair of houses, later combined into a public house, it is in stone with a stone slate roof. There are two storeys and two bays. The doorways and windows have architraves. On the front are two doorways, one blocked, the windows are mullioned with three lights, and above the doorway is an initialled datestone.	II
Bowling Green Hotel; 53.90428°N 1.69281°W		1755	Originally assembly rooms, later a public house, it is in stone, with a string course, and a stone slate roof. There are two storeys and a symmetrical front of five bays. Above the central doorway is a Venetian window, and the other windows have flat heads. In the west gable end is a blocked doorway with a dated and initialled pediment.	II
5 Beech Hill; 53.90577°N 1.69507°W		1759	A stone shop with three storeys and three bays. In the ground floor is a shop front, and a passage in the left bay. The windows have stone architraves; in the middle floor they are casements, and the top floor contains sashes. In the middle floor is an initialled datestone.	II
14 Gay Lane; 53.90365°N 1.69036°W		1761	A stone house with a stone slate roof that was later extended, it has two storeys, three bays, and a single-storey extension. The doorway and windows have architraves.	II
26 Beech Hill; 53.90515°N 1.69584°W	—	Late 18th century	A shop in millstone grit, with a sill band, and a stone slate roof. There are two storeys and three bays. In the left bay of the ground floor is a doorway with a moulded architrave, a fanlight, and a cornice. To its right is a modern shop front, and the upper floor contains three casement windows with plain surrounds.	II
28 and 28A Beech Hill; 53.90508°N 1.69595°W		Late 18th century	A house, later a shop, in stone, with a sill band, and a hipped stone slate roof. There are two storeys and three bays. In the centre is a doorway with pilasters, a semicircular fanlight with Gothic-style glazing, and a pediment. This is flanked by shop windows, and in the upper floor are three windows.	II
66 Boroughgate; 53.90597°N 1.69041°W		Late 18th century	A private house, later a public house, in stone, with string courses, a blue slate roof, two storeys and three bays. There are two doorways, one in the centre, the other to the right, each with a rectangular fanlight with ornamental glazing, two windows in the ground floor and three in the upper floor.	II
8–14 Charles Street; 53.90463°N 1.69112°W		Late 18th century	A row of four stone cottages with an eaves cornice forming a gutter, a stone slate roof, and two storeys. The doorways are paired and have moulded architraves, rectangular fanlights, and cornices. At the rear are staircase windows.	II
Ivy House; 53.90474°N 1.69256°W		Late 18th century	A stone house with a stone slate roof, coped gables and kneelers. There are three storeys and a symmetrical front of three bays. The central doorway has moulded jambs, a semicircular fanlight with a moulded surround, and a keystone. The window above the doorway has a similar surround and is blocked, and the other windows have flat heads and architraves.	II
West Lodge, Otley Lodge, walls, pillars and gates 53.91169°N 1.68896°W		Late 18th century (probable)	The pair of lodges flank the drive and the entrance to the Farnley Estate. They are in gritstone, with rusticated quoins, a moulded eaves cornice, and a hipped stone slate roof with a ball finial. Each lodge has a doorway with an architrave, a keystone and a cornice. They are flanked by walls sweeping towards the road and to each other and ending in gritstone pillars with chamfered rustication, moulded square capitals, a cornice and a pyramidal roof. The ornate gates are in wrought iron.	II
White Swan Public House; 53.90598°N 1.69015°W		Late 18th century	The public house was extended to the right in 1901, and is in stone with a stone slate roof and two storeys. The original part has three bays and a central doorway with a semicircular head. In the upper floor are two Venetian windows flanking a window with a semicircular head. The extension has two bays, it is gabled, and the upper storey is jettied with timber framing and tile hanging. In the ground floor are two mullioned and transomed windows, and to the right is an archway, over which is a carved and painted plaque depicting a swan.	II
Manor House; 53.90684°N 1.69483°W		1792	The house, which was later altered and extended, is in stone with string courses, a moulded eaves cornice, a parapet, and a blue slate roof. The original range has three storeys, the top storey added later, and five bays. On the front is a Tuscan porch. The later wing to the left has two storeys and four bays, and in the end bay is a niche surmounted by a vase. At the rear are Diocletian and Venetian windows, and a bow window.	II
16 Bondgate; 53.90423°N 1.69319°W		Late 18th or early 19th century	A shop on a corner site, it is in stone with a stone slate roof, hipped on the right. There are two storeys, two bays on the front and one on the right return. The doorway and windows have architraves. In the ground floor are late 19th-century shop fronts, with the doorway in the angled corner between.	II
1 Bridge Street; 53.90646°N 1.69353°W		Late 18th or early 19th century	A pair of shops in stone with a stone slate roof, three storeys and two bays. In the ground floor are two doorways with architraves, and two modern bow windows, and this upper floors contain three-light mullioned windows.	II
7 Courthouse Street; 53.90626°N 1.69347°W		18th or early 19th century	A warehouse later used for other purposes, it is in stone with kneelers. There are four storeys and three bays. In the ground floor are two doorways and two shop windows, and each upper floor contains three windows.	II
12 Mercury Row; 53.90455°N 1.69329°W		Late 18th or early 19th century	The building is in stone with a stone slate roof and two storeys. The windows and doorway have chamfered surrounds and architraves.	II
24 New Market; 53.90490°N 1.69308°W		18th or early 19th century	A stone shop with eaves on brackets, two storeys and one bay. The doorway and windows have architraves.	II
26 and 28 New Market; 53.90484°N 1.69301°W		18th or early 19th century	A pair of shops in stone, with eaves on brackets, four storeys and two bays. In the ground floor are a shop front, a shop window, and a doorway with a fanlight. The windows have architraves and most are sashes.	II
Manor House public house and 9 Cross Green; 53.90547°N 1.68964°W		Late 18th or early 19th century	The public house, which incorporates the adjacent house, is in stone with a stone slate roof and a kneeler on the right. There are two storeys and four bays. The openings have architraves, the windows are sashes, the doorway has a fanlight, and on the left is a passage opening.	II
40 Bondgate; 53.90407°N 1.69133°W		Early 19th century	A house later used for other purposes, it is in stone with sill bands and a stone slate roof. There are three storeys and four bays. The windows are sashes.	II
71 and 73 Bondgate; 53.90385°N 1.69134°W		Early 19th century (probable)	A pair of stone cottages with a stone slate roof and two storeys. Each cottage has one bay, the doorways have architraves, and the windows are sashes.	II
17–21 Clapgate; 53.90622°N 1.69430°W		Early 19th century	A pair of shops in stone with a sill band and a kneeler on the left. There are three storeys and two bays. In the ground floor are modern shop fronts, and the left bay in the middle floor contains a rectangular bay window.	II
2 Kirkgate; 53.90528°N 1.69404°W		Early 19th century (probable)	A shop on a corner site in stone with three storeys. There are four bays on Kirkgate, and two on Market Street. In the ground floor is a modern shop front, the upper floors contain sash windows, and over the Market Street front is a parapet.	II
61 and 63 Kirkgate; 53.90461°N 1.69430°W		Early 19th century	A stone shop with a sill band and a stone shop roof. There are two storeys and two bays. In the ground floor is a modern shop front, and the upper floors contain sash windows.	II
2 and 4 Market Place; 53.90555°N 1.69319°W		Early 19th century	A shop in stone, with sill bands, and a stone slate roof. There are three storeys and three bays. In the ground floor are modern shop fronts, and each upper floor contains three windows.	II
8 Market Place; 53.90582°N 1.69404°W		Early 19th century	A stone shop with four storeys and one bay. The ground floor contains a modern shop front, and in each of the upper floors is a window with an architrave.	II
40 Market Place; 53.90536°N 1.69395°W		Early 19th century	A shop in painted stone, with brick on the sides, a band, and a stone slate roof. There are three storeys and one bay. In the ground floor is a modern shop front, the upper floors each contain one window.	II
5 Manor Square; 53.90586°N 1.69438°W		Early 19th century	A stone shop with three storeys, two bays, and a kneeler on the left. In the ground floor is a modern shop front, and each upper floor contains two windows.	II
7 Manor Square; 53.90595°N 1.69436°W		Early 19th century (probable)	A shop, at one time an inn, it is in stone with a stone slate roof. There are three storeys and two bays. In the ground floor is a modern shop front, and the upper floors contain segmental-arched windows.	II
All Saints Vicarage; 53.90352°N 1.69564°W		Early 19th century	The vicarage is in stone, and has a slate roof with coped gables. There are two storeys and an attic, three bays, and an extension to the left. In the centre is a doorway with an architrave and a rectangular fanlight, over which is a Venetian window, and in the attic is a modern dormer. The windows are sashes with architraves, and at the rear are two full-height canted bay windows.	II
Bay Horse public house 53.90583°N 1.69357°W		Early 19th century	The public house is in stone, with gutters on paired corbels, and a Welsh slate roof with coped gables. There are three storeys, one bay, and an earlier rear wing. The doorway has an architrave, and in each floor is a two-light window with a mullion.	II
Bloomfield House; 53.90309°N 1.69029°W		Early 19th century	A stone house with a stone slate roof, two storeys and attics, and three bays. The central doorway has a rectangular fanlight, and it is flanked by canted bay windows. In the upper floor are sash windows with architraves, and there are two gabled dormers.	II
Boat Buildings; 53.90656°N 1.68901°W		Early 19th century	A group of stone barns and cowhouses around a cobbled yard. The buildings incorporate 17th-century walling that includes a blocked doorway, initialled, and dated 1606.	II
Caley House and 11 Cross Green; 53.90554°N 1.68949°W		Early 19th century	A pair of stone houses with a stone slate roof, two storeys and three bays. The windows and doorways have architraves, and the doorways have fanlights.	II
Chippendale House; 53.90497°N 1.69435°W		Early 19th century	A shop in stone with a stone slate roof. There are three storeys and two bays. The ground floor has part of a modern shop front in the right bay, and a flat-arched carriage entrance in the left bay. Above are two windows with architraves in each floor.	II
Leeds House Cafe; 53.90556°N 1.69397°W	—	Early 19th century	The building is in stone with three storeys and two bays. It contains a doorway with an architrave, a doorway with a quoined surround, and a modern shop front.	II
Red Lion Public House; 53.90488°N 1.69433°W		Early 19th century	The public house is in stone with a stone slate roof, three storeys and four bays. The windows have architraves, and in the left bay is a segmental-arched entry.	II
The Fleece Public House; 53.90408°N 1.70034°W		Early 19th century	The public house is in stone on a plinth, with a sill band, paired gutter brackets, and a Welsh slate roof. There are two storeys, a main range of three bays, and a lower two-bay extension recessed on the right. The doorways and windows have architraves, and the doorways have rectangular fanlights.	II
The Junction Public House; 53.90408°N 1.69105°W		Early 19th century	The public house is on a corner site, and is in stone with a hipped Welsh slate roof. There are two storeys, two bays on Bondgate, three bays on Charles Street, and the lower storey on the corner is angled. The doorways and windows have architraves, and the main doorway has a rectangular fanlight.	II
40 Boroughgate; 53.90597°N 1.69152°W		1826	Originally a Methodist chapel, later used for other purposes, it is in stone with end pilasters, a moulded cornice and blocking course, and a hipped slate roof. There are two storeys and four bays. In the ground floor are two doorways with moulded surrounds and paterae, and the windows are sashes with round-arched heads.	II
Ashfield House; 53.90906°N 1.70557°W	—	c. 1830	The house is in stone with a sill band, a dentilled eaves cornice, a parapet, and a Welsh slate roof. There are two storeys, a symmetrical front of five bays, the middle three bays projecting slightly, and rear extensions. In the centre is a portico with two Tuscan columns. The windows are sashes, the window above the portico with an architrave and a cornice, and those flanking it in recessed round-headed arches. At the rear is a Venetian staircase window, and in the right return is a full-height bow window. The rear extensions have an embattled parapet.	II
Church Hall; 53.90384°N 1.69619°W		c. 1830	Originally a school, later used as a church hall, it is in stone with a string course forming a hood mould, bracketed eaves, and a stone slate roof. There is a single storey and five bays. In the centre is a round-arched doorway, and the outer bays contain paired round-arched windows divided by foliated engaged columns.	II
121 Ilkley Road; 53.90309°N 1.70503°W	—	c. 1834	Originally a manager's house, it is at right angles to the road, and is in stone with sill bands and a Welsh slate roof. There are two storeys and three bays. On the front is a doorway with an architrave and a fanlight, and sash windows. At the rear is a staircase window and two other windows, all in architraves.	II
21–25 Kirkgate; 53.90535°N 1.69471°W	—	Early to mid 19th century	A row of three stone houses with a stone slate roof and kneelers. There are three storeys and a basement, and three bays. The doorways have architraves, one has a fanlight, and iron railings surround the basement area.	II
22 Kirkgate; 53.90492°N 1.69397°W	—	Early to mid 19th century	A pair of stone shops with a stone slate roof, three storeys and four bays. In the ground floor is a passage entry flanked by shop fronts. The upper floors contain windows in architraves, two of which are blind.	II
37 and 39 Kirkgate; 53.90502°N 1.69434°W		Early to mid 19th century	A pair of stone shops in two parts, the left part with three storeys and two bays, the right part in four storeys and three bays, with paired gutter brackets. In the ground floor, from the left, is a passage entry, a modern shop front, a doorway, and an earlier shop front, over which is a rectangular oriel window with six segmental lights and a dentilled cornice. The other windows are sashes in architraves.	II
4 and 6 Market Place; 53.90581°N 1.69414°W		Early to mid 19th century	A pair of stone shops with bands, and a stone slate roof. There are three storeys and two bays. In the ground floor are two shop fronts, one modern, the other dating from the 19th century, and the upper floors have two windows in each floor.	II
Former Masons Arms Public House; 53.90641°N 1.69437°W		Early to mid 19th century	The former public house is in stone with a stone slate roof. There are two storeys, three bays, and an extension on the left. The windows and doorways, one a passage door, have architraves.	II
Whitakers Arms Public House; 53.90479°N 1.69437°W		Early to mid 19th century	The public house is in stone with a stone slate roof, two storeys and two bays. The central doorway has a quoined surround and carved lintel, and there are two windows in each floor.	II
Manor Club; 53.90641°N 1.69437°W		1840	Originally a grammar school built in the style of the 17th century, and since used for other purposes. It is in stone with a moulded string course, and a stone slate roof with coped gables, kneelers and finials. There are two storeys and three bays, all gabled. In the middle bay is a two-storey canted bay window containing mullioned and transomed windows. Each of the outer bays has a Tudor arched doorway and mullioned windows above, all with hood moulds.	II*
Cross Green Youth Centre; 53.90596°N 1.68816°W		1844	Originally a school and master's house, it is in stone with a stone slate roof. The school has a single storey, a double-depth plan, and six bays, and contains quoins. The left two bays project under a gable and contain a gabled doorway with a Tudor arched head, above which is a shield, a datestone, and pinnacles. In the other bays are windows with quoined surrounds and hood moulds. Linked to the rear right is the house that has two storeys and a cross-wing.	II
1, 1A and 3 Beech Hill; 53.90580°N 1.69492°W	—	19th century	A pair of shops in painted stone with a stone slate roof. There are two storeys and four bays. In the ground floor are shop fronts, and the upper floor contains four windows.	II
15 Clapgate; 53.90615°N 1.69442°W		Mid 19th century	A shop on a corner site, it is in stone with a sill band, a modillion eaves cornice, and a hipped roof. There are three storeys, three bays on the front, and one on the left return. In the ground floor is a modern shop front.	II
10 and 12 Kirkgate; 53.90504°N 1.69401°W		19th century	A bank and a shop in stone with three storeys. There are five bays, the middle bay projecting under a pediment. In the ground floor are modern shop fronts, and in the upper floors most windows are sashes, the centre window in the middle floor with pilasters and a pediment.	II
Memorial to Victims of Bramhope Tunnel Disaster; 53.90448°N 1.69477°W		19th century	The memorial in the churchyard of All Saints' Church is to the memory of the workmen killed during the construction of the Bramhope Tunnel in 1845–49. It is in stone and consists of a smaller scale replica of the north portal of the tunnel. The memorial has a rectangular base, with a round tower on each corner, and the whole is embattled. On the south side is an inscribed panel, and the memorial is enclosed in cast iron railings.	II
Three milestones built into a wall 53.90957°N 1.69660°W		19th century	The milestones are set into walling on the junction of Weston Lane, Newall Avenue and Farnley Lane. They are inscribed with pointing hands and the directions to local places, including Blubberhouses and Askwith.	II
Former Royal White Horse Hotel; 53.90598°N 1.69471°W		1865	The hotel, later used for other purposes, is in stone with a modillion eaves cornice and a hipped slate roof. There are three storeys and a basement, and a front of eight bays. On the front is a portico with square columns, a moulded cornice, and a cast iron balcony with two lamp holders. To the right is a round-arched carriage entry with an oriel window above. To the right of the entry, the ground floor is rusticated with square-headed windows, and elsewhere the windows are round-headed sashes with moulded surrounds and rusticated keystones.	II
Former Mechanics' Institute; 53.90613°N 1.68938°W		1869–71	The mechanic's institute, later used for other purposes, is in stone with quoined pilasters, above which are carved panels, and a moulded cornice. The building is in Italianate style, it has two storeys, and a symmetrical front of five bays, the middle three bays projecting. In the centre is a portico with paired Doric columns, a bracketed frieze and a balustraded balcony. The windows in the ground floor have slightly segmental-arched heads. In the upper floor are round-headed windows, between which are columns, and above are keystones carved as heads.	II
Pair of Cemetery Chapels; 53.90866°N 1.68370°W		c. 1870	The chapels are in sandstone with Welsh slate roofs, and are joined by an archway with a tower. The tower rises from a pointed arch and has two stages, quoined buttresses, and a broach spire with two tiers of lucarnes. The chapels have gables, and contain doorways with moulded arches and hood moulds.	II
Westgate First School and wall 53.90329°N 1.70239°W		1871	The school is in stone, and has a Welsh slate roof with moulded coped gables, kneelers, finials, and crested ridge tiles. There is a single storey and nine bays, the left two bays projecting as a gabled wing, and a rear wing. The porch is gabled and contains a doorway with a pointed arch and an oculus in the gable, and the other bays are alternately gabled. Two sides of the playground are enclosed by a tall wall with chamfered coping, railings, and intermediate stone piers.	II
Entrance Block and Casual Wards, Wharfedale Hospital; 53.91484°N 1.69753°W		1873	Originally the entrance to a workhouse, it is in stone on a plinth, with dentilled eaves, and a Welsh slate roof with coped gables. There is a single storey and nine irregular bays, and a central arched carriage entrance with a hood mould and a coped gable with a finial. In the flanking bays are three gables, the larger two containing three round-arched windows and a circular opening above; the windows in the other bays have flat heads.	II
Former Infirmary Block, Wall and Steps, Wharfedale Hospital; 53.91533°N 1.69863°W		1873	Originally part of a workhouse and later used for other purposes, it is in stone on a plinth, with dentilled eaves, and a hipped Welsh slate roof. There are two storeys, and a symmetrical front containing two doorways with fanlights, approached by steps. Flanking these and above are single and paired windows, totalling 16 in the upper floor. At each end is a single-storey projection, on the left with a hipped roof, and on the right with a pitched roof, and at the rear are two-storey annexes. Across the front of the building is a low retaining wall containing a pair of coped square piers in the centre.	II
Main Block and Ancillary Buildings, Wharfedale Hospital; 53.91491°N 1.69855°W		1873	Originally part of a workhouse and later used for other purposes, it is in stone with Welsh slate roofs. The main block is on a plinth, with dentilled eaves, two storeys, a T-shaped plan, and a symmetrical front of nine bays. The central block projects and rises as a square tower containing three-light windows with continuous hood moulds, above which are machicolations, a parapet with round piercings and corner finials, and a flat-topped pyramidal roof with a cast iron crest and gabled lucarnes. In the centre of the block is a round-arched doorway flanked by canted bay windows, and in the upper floor are paired round-arched windows. Most of the other windows have flat heads, and at the ends are gabled bays. At the rear are ancillary buildings, including a dining room and chapel, kitchens, store rooms, and service blocks.	II
Otley Methodist Church; 53.90567°N 1.69027°W		1874	The church is in stone with two storeys, and is in Italianate style. It has a symmetrical front of five bays, the middle three bays projecting under a moulded and bracketed pediment. In the ground floor is an arcade of three arches with engaged Doric columns and panelled spandrels. There is an entablature with a parapet and paired quoin pilasters. In the upper floor are three round-headed windows, and the tympanum of the pediment contains an oculus with a scrolled surround, and the pediment is surmounted by a vase. The outer bays have half-pediments and contain windows with keystones. Along the sides are seven bays, with a central pediment containing an oculus.	II
1–5 Guycroft; 53.90466°N 1.69777°W		Late 19th century	A row of five houses in coloured glazed brick with a slate roof. There are two storeys and each house has one bay. There is a doorway on the left, a window to the right and a window above. All the openings have segmental heads, and the windows are casements.	II
9 Manor Square; 53.90601°N 1.69434°W		Late 19th century	The building, at one time part of a bank, is in stone with sill bands, a cornice, a parapet, and a Welsh slate roof. There are three storeys and an attic, and two bays. In the ground floor are three modern windows and pilasters, the middle floor contains modern casement windows, in the top floor are two three-light windows, and there are two round-arched dormers.	II
All Saints School and master's house 53.90763°N 1.69271°W		1879	The school, which was later extended, and the house, are in stone with roofs of grey and green slate and red ridge tiles, and is in Gothic style. The original school range has one storey and seven bays, and the extension to the right has two storeys and eight bays. The house to the left has two storeys and two bays, the right bay being a full-height bay window with a hipped roof and a finial. The school has gables, and the features include a flèche with a weathervane, and a fleur-de-lis finial.	II
Former Liberal club 53.90620°N 1.69217°W		1879–81	The building is in stone with slate roofs and terracotta ridge cresting. There are two storeys, and the front facing Wesley Street has three bays. In the centre is a doorway in a double-chamfered pointed arch with a stepped hood mould containing the date. Above it is a canted oriel window, in the outer bays are casement windows, and between the floors is a band with quatrefoils. On each corner is a canted balcony with French doors. The front on Courthouse Street has five bays, the right three bays with an attic, and it contains a similar doorway and a band with shields. At the rear is a curved staircase tower with lancet windows.	II
Jubilee Clock; 53.90543°N 1.69424°W		1888	The clock tower was built on the site of the former market cross to celebrate the Golden Jubilee of Queen Victoria. The lower part is in stone and at the top is ornamental iron cresting. Around the base are drinking troughs, above these are a doorway and inscriptions, and at the top is a clock face on each front.	II
Otley Congregational Church and Sunday School; 53.90744°N 1.69342°W		1897–99	The church and the former Sunday school, which dates from 1881–82, are in stone, and are in Gothic Revival style. The church consists of a nave with a clerestory, north and south aisles, north and south double transepts, a chancel, and an octagonal northwest turret with crocketed pinnacles and a small spire. The Sunday school is recessed to the east.	II
War memorial and garden 53.90419°N 1.69251°W		1920	The garden of remembrance was established around the memorial cross in 1955. The cross has a central boss, and the arms are carved with animals and saints. It is on a tapering shaft with carving on the front and sides and an inscription, and stands on a base of three steps on a paved area. The garden has a memorial wall, flower beds, and a sunken garden containing the cross. On the memorial wall are bronze plaques with inscriptions and the names of those lost in the Second World War. At the entrance to the garden are decorative metal gates and square stone piers.	II
Telephone kiosk 53.90404°N 1.69377°W		1935	The telephone kiosk is on the pavement outside 1, Bondgate. It is of the K6 type, designed by Giles Gilbert Scott. Constructed in cast iron with a square plan and a dome, it has unperforated crowns in the top panels.	II
Pair of telephone kiosks 53.90559°N 1.69385°W		1935	The telephone kiosks are in Market Place, and are of the K6 type, designed by Giles Gilbert Scott. Constructed in cast iron with a square plan and a dome, they have unperforated crowns in the top panels.	II
75 Bondgate; 53.90385°N 1.69124°W		Undated	Originally an outhouse and later used for other purposes. It is in stone with a stone slate roof, one storey and one bay. On the front is a doorway and a 19th-century shop front.	II
