= All Saints' Church, Otley =

All Saints'
- All Saints' Parish Church
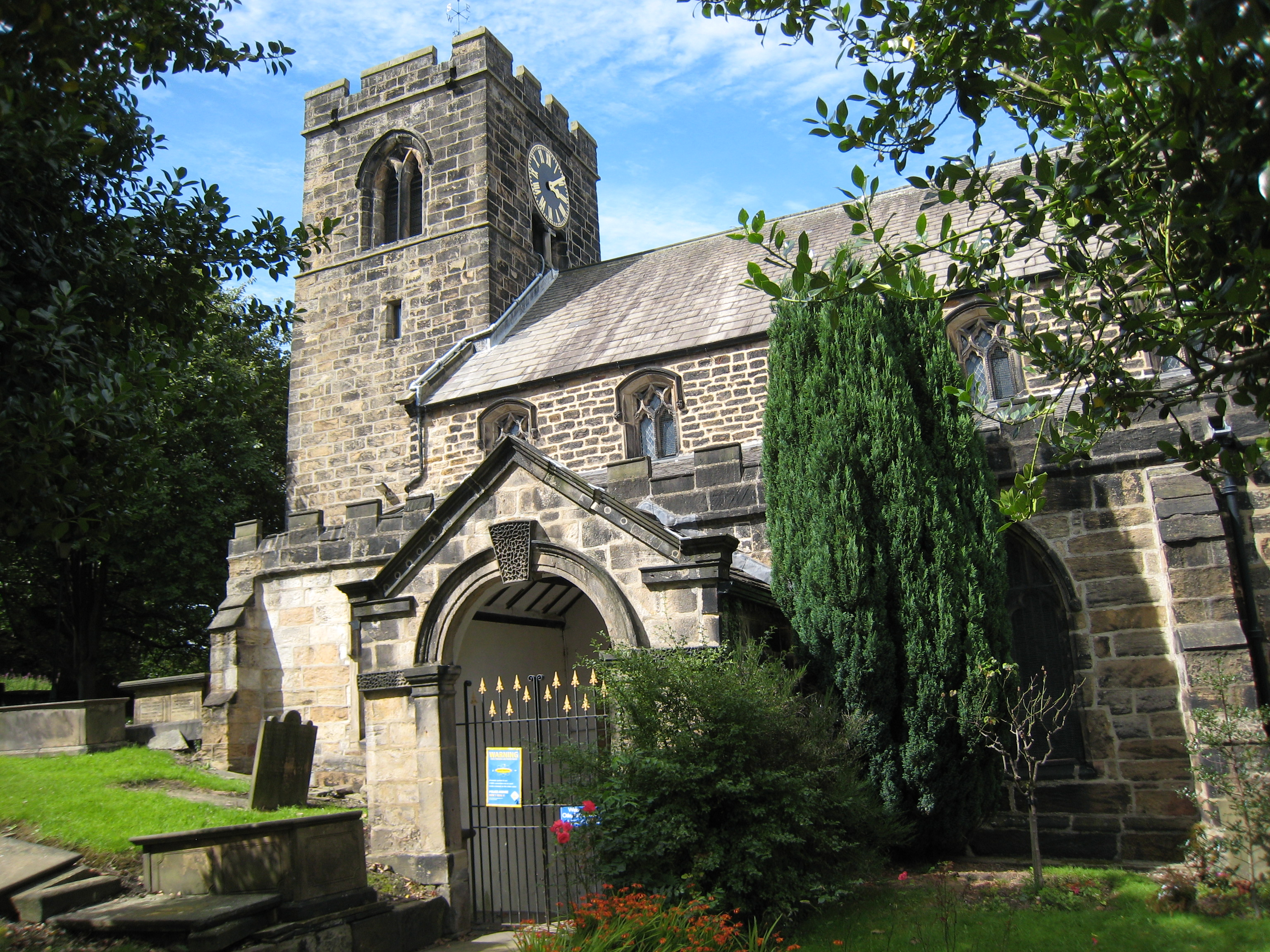
- Exterior: tower, clock, entrance
- All Saints'
- 53°54′15″N 1°41′41″W
- OS grid reference: SE 20157 45363
- Location: Otley, West Yorkshire
- Country: England
- Denomination: Church of England
- Churchmanship: Open Evangelical

History
- Status: Parish Church

Specifications
- Materials: rubble stone

Administration
- Province: York
- Diocese: Leeds
- Archdeaconry: Leeds
- Parish: Otley

All Saints' Church in Otley, West Yorkshire, England is an active Anglican parish church in the archdeaconry of Leeds and the Diocese of Leeds.

== History ==
The church is of Norman origin with alterations from the 14th to the 18th centuries. There is an altar tomb on which there is the recumbent effigies of Thomas, Lord Fairfax; an army commander under Elizabeth I and later MP for Yorkshire and his wife. The church was Grade I listed on 30 July 1951.

== Architectural style ==
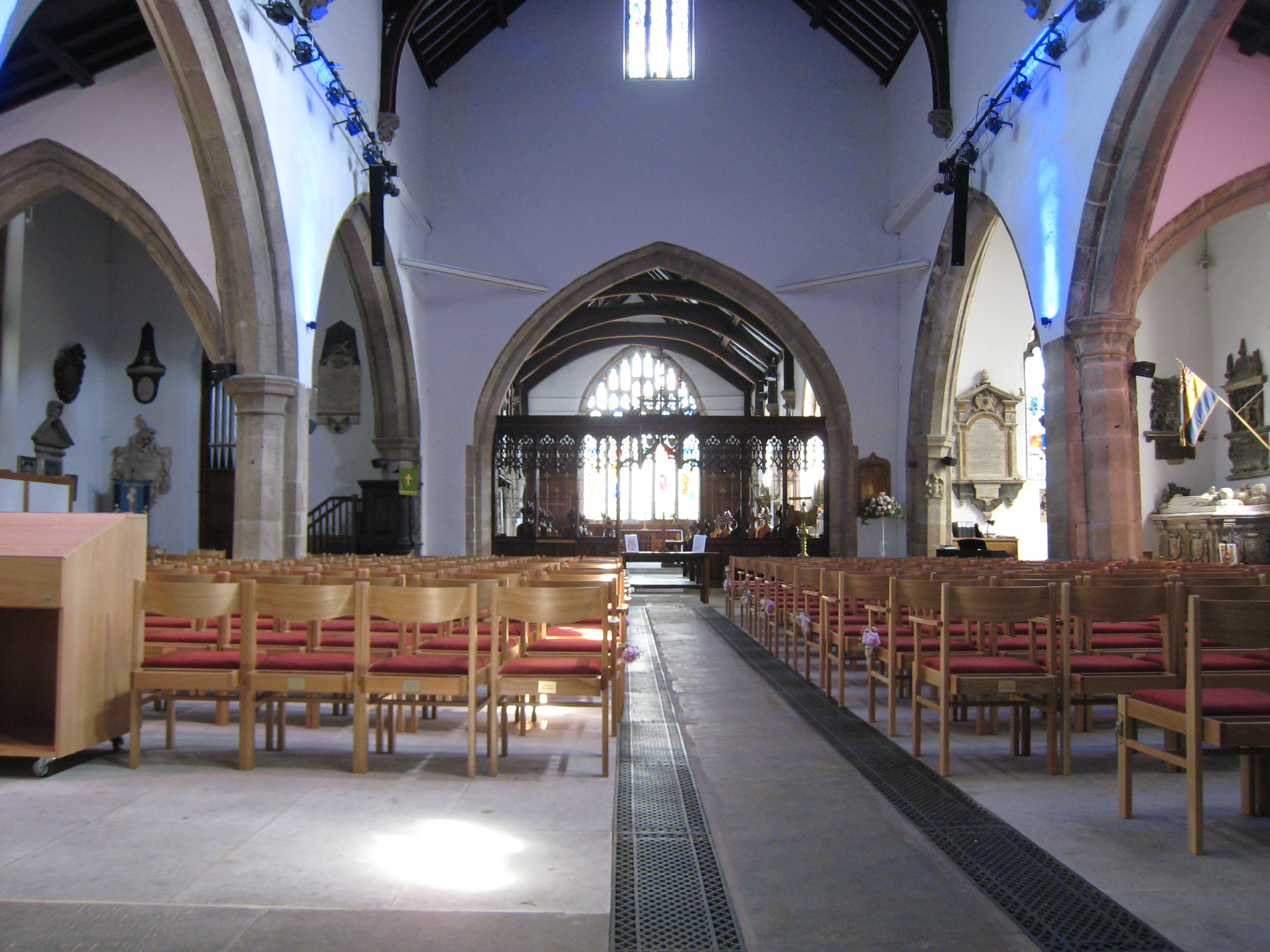
Interior

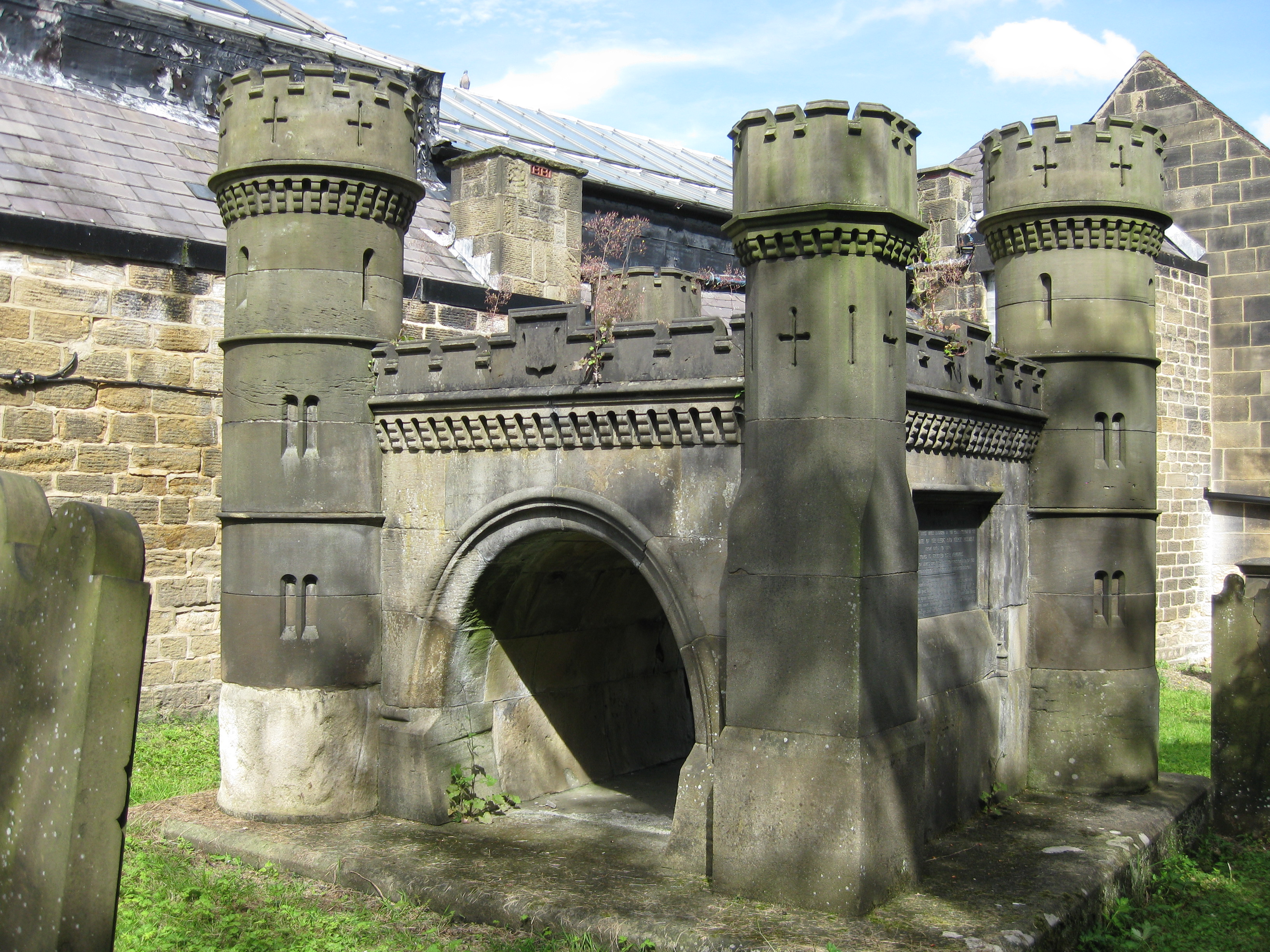
Navvies' Memorial

The earliest parts are of rubble stone. The church has tall perpendicular windows with the exception of the chancel which has two Norman windows. The church has a Georgian oak pulpit. The church has a Norman doorway to its north although it's doubtful it is in its original position. Outside the church is a memorial in memory of the navvies who died building the nearby Bramhope Tunnel between 1845 and 1849.

== See also ==
- List of places of worship in the City of Leeds
- Grade I listed churches in West Yorkshire
- Grade I listed buildings in West Yorkshire
- Listed buildings in Otley
