= Keighley bus station =

Bus station in West Yorkshire, England

Keighley
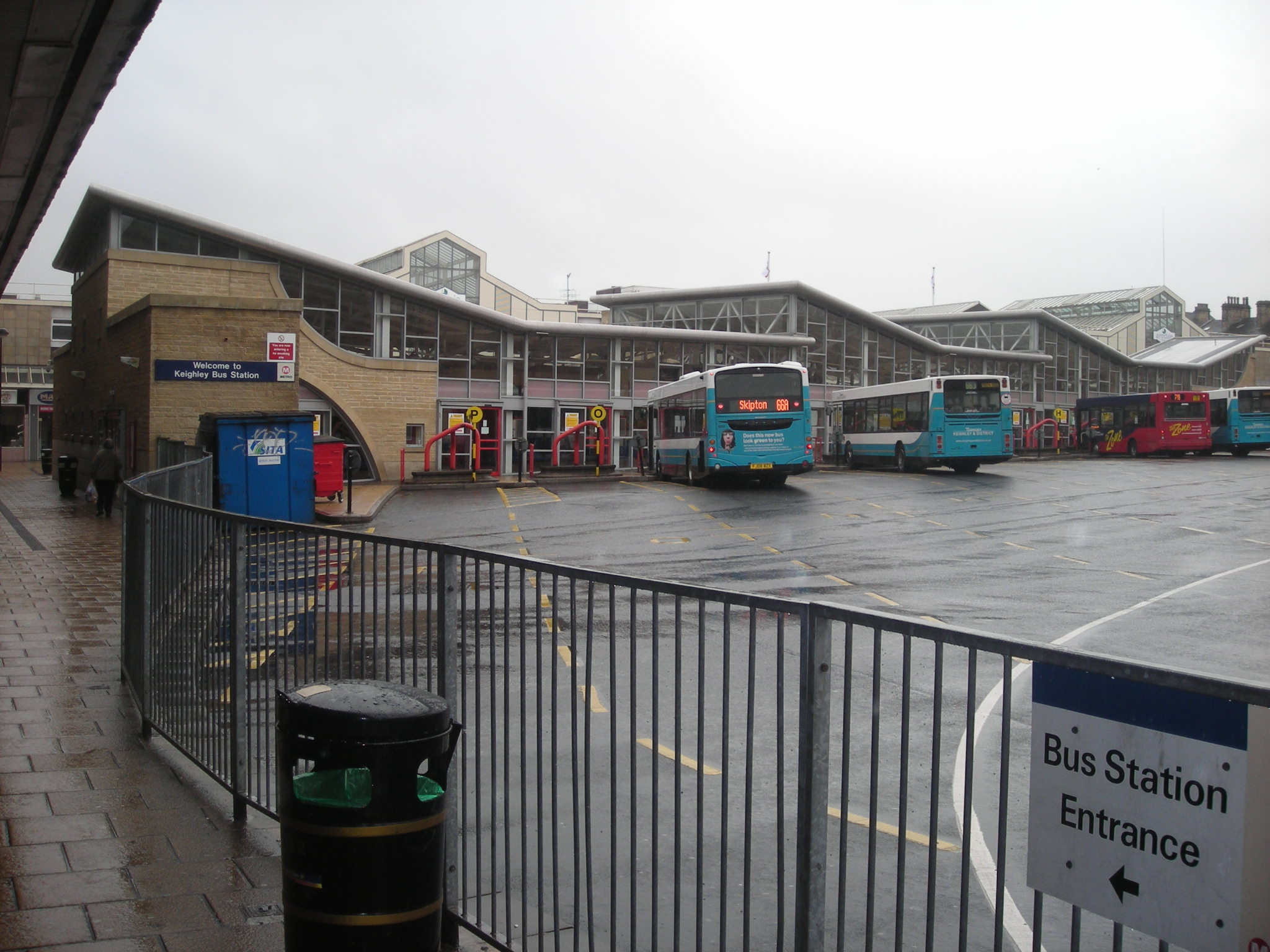

General information
- Location: Bow Street, Keighley; City of Bradford; England
- Coordinates: 53.8673°N 1.9081°W
- Operator: Metro
- Bus stands: 17
- Bus operators: Keighley Bus Company; Burnley Bus Company; Yorkshire Tiger
- Connections: Keighley railway station (440 yards [400 m])

History
- Opened: 1940
Location

Keighley bus station serves the town of Keighley, West Yorkshire, England. The bus station is owned and managed by Metro.

== History ==
The bus station is situated in Keighley town centre next to the Airedale Centre and can be accessed from Bow Street and Towngate. The bus station was opened off Lawkholme Crescent in the town in 1940. Bus shelters were added in 1970 after the Airedale Shopping centre opened up on the south side of the bus station in the late 1960s. The station was re-built in 2002 by Metro.

In the updated Pevsner's guide to West (Riding of) Yorkshire, Peter Leach made note of the jagged roofline and masonry at each end of the building.

There are 17 stands at the bus station and the main operators are Keighley Bus Company and Burnley Bus Company with other services run by Jackson's of Silsden and Team Pennine (Formerly Yorkshire Tiger)

== Services ==
Buses run from the bus station around the town of Keighley. They also run as far afield as Burnley (extending to Padiham and Accrington until 2011), Skipton (extending to Grassington until 2011), Ilkley (extended to Otley and Leeds Bradford Airport in 2016), Leeds (extending to Wetherby from 1993 to 1997), Bradford and Hebden Bridge (previously Todmorden until 2007).

== Previous bus station ==
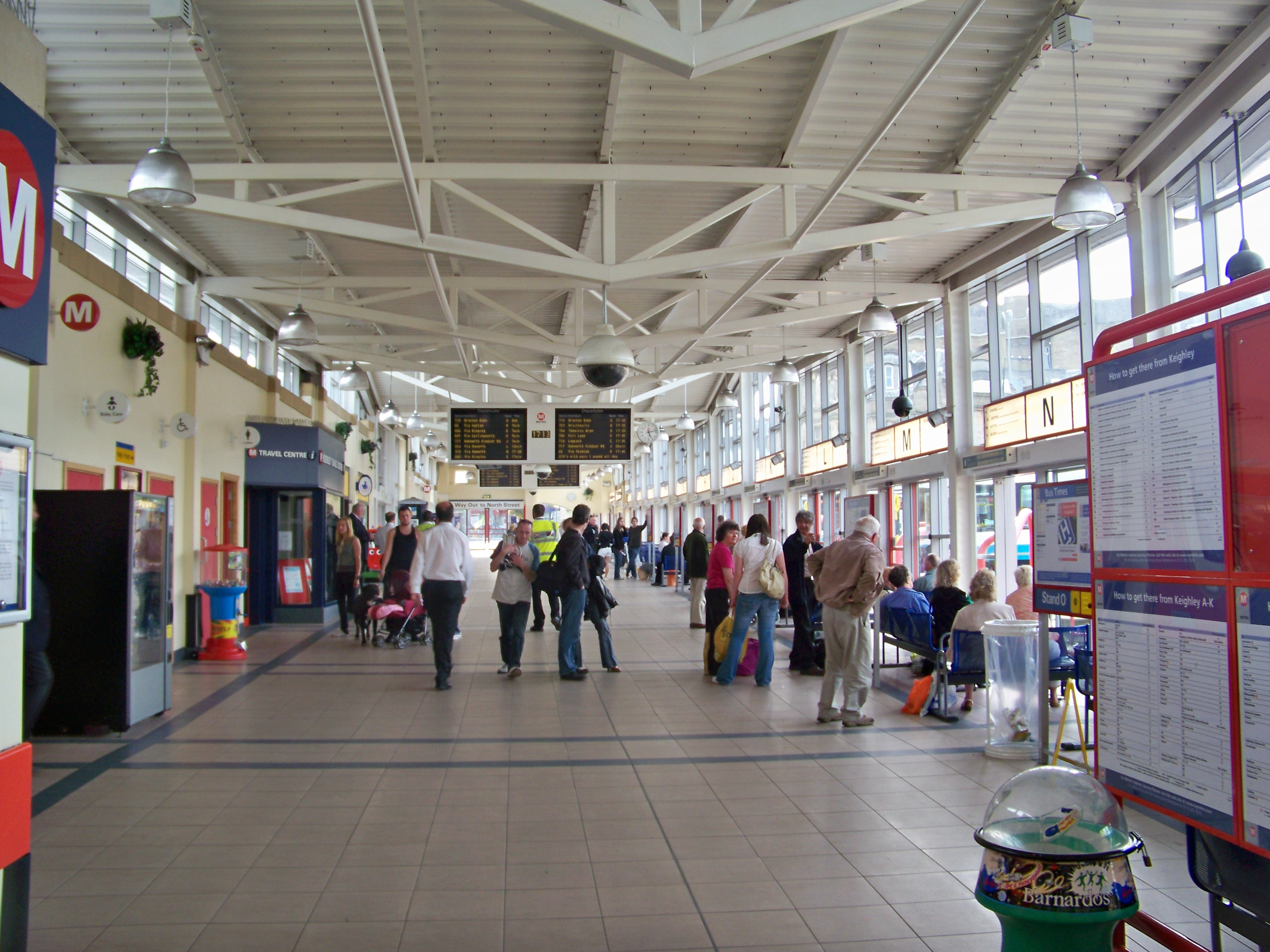
Interior of Keighley bus station

Keighley's previous bus station was constructed in 1940 and the bus shelters were added in 1970. It was closed in 2001 to make way for the current bus station which opened in 2002. It was served originally by West Yorkshire Automobile before 1987 and deregulation. After deregulation, it was served by Keighley & District and First Calderdale & Huddersfield. Between 2001 and 2002 buses waited in the surrounding streets whilst the current bus station was being constructed. In 1997 many services were withdrawn these included through services from Bradford to Haworth, Oxenhope and Oakworth.
