= Wharfedale Hospital =

- Leeds Teaching Hospitals NHS Trust
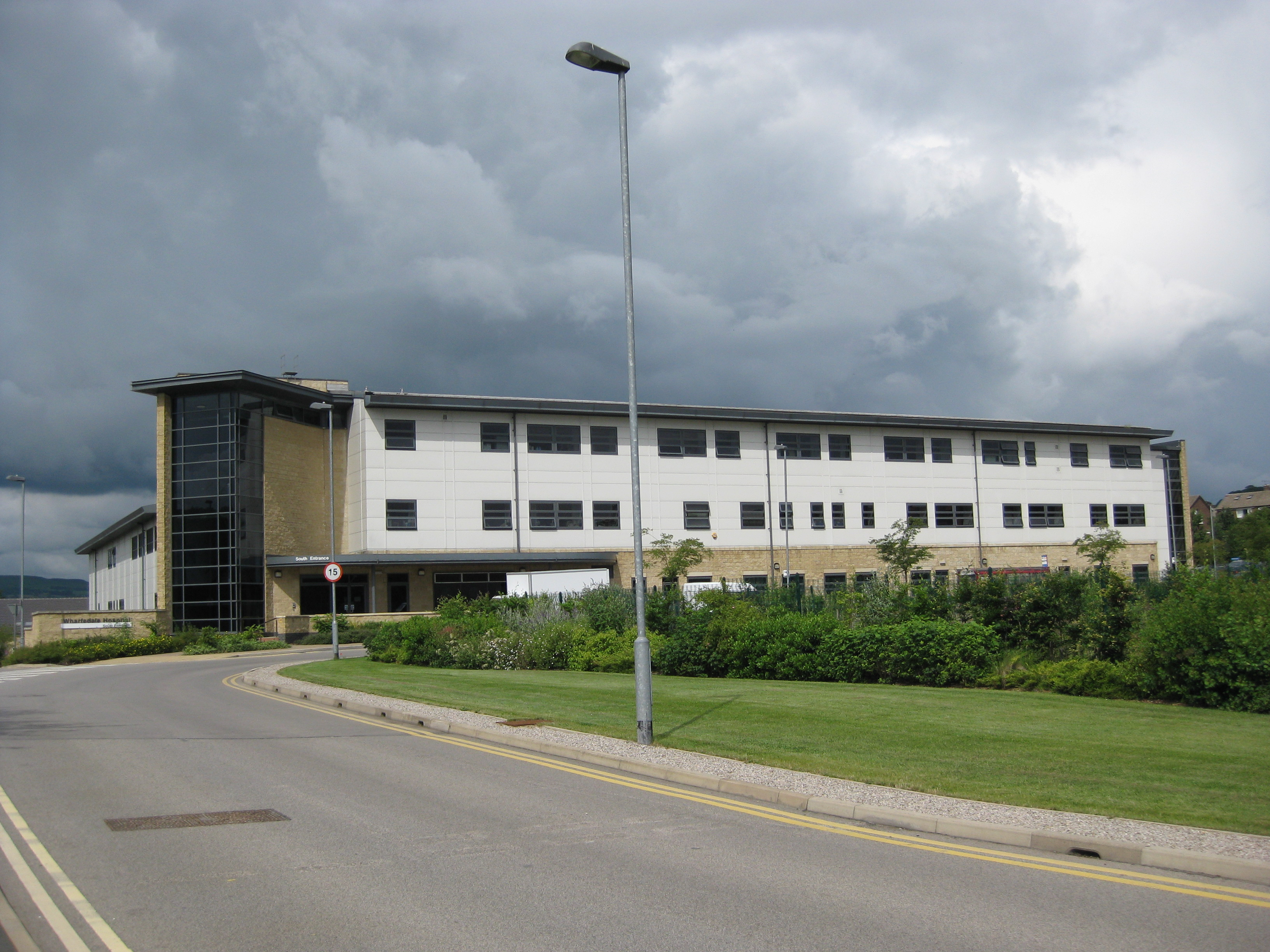
- Wharfedale Hospital

- Shown in West Yorkshire

Geography
- Location: Otley, West Yorkshire, England
- Coordinates: 53.9141°N 1.7001°W

Organisation
- Care system: NHS
- Type: General

History
- Founded: 1873

Links
- Website: www.leedsth.nhs.uk/patients-visitors/our-hospitals/wharfedale-hospital/
- Lists: Hospitals in England

Wharfedale Hospital (formerly known as Wharfedale General Hospital) is located in the market town of Otley, West Yorkshire, England, and is managed by the Leeds Teaching Hospitals NHS Trust.

== History ==
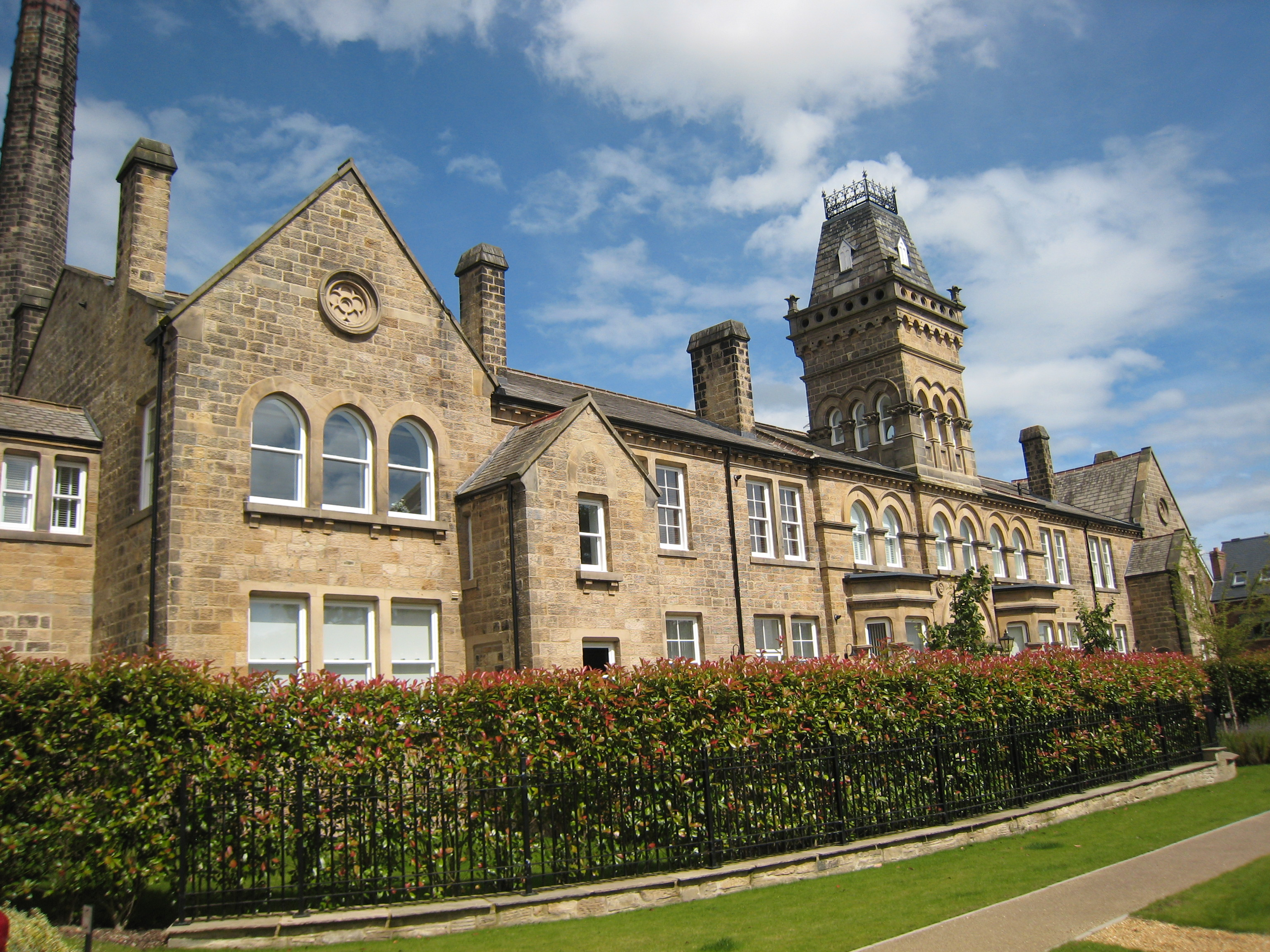
Former hospital, now flats

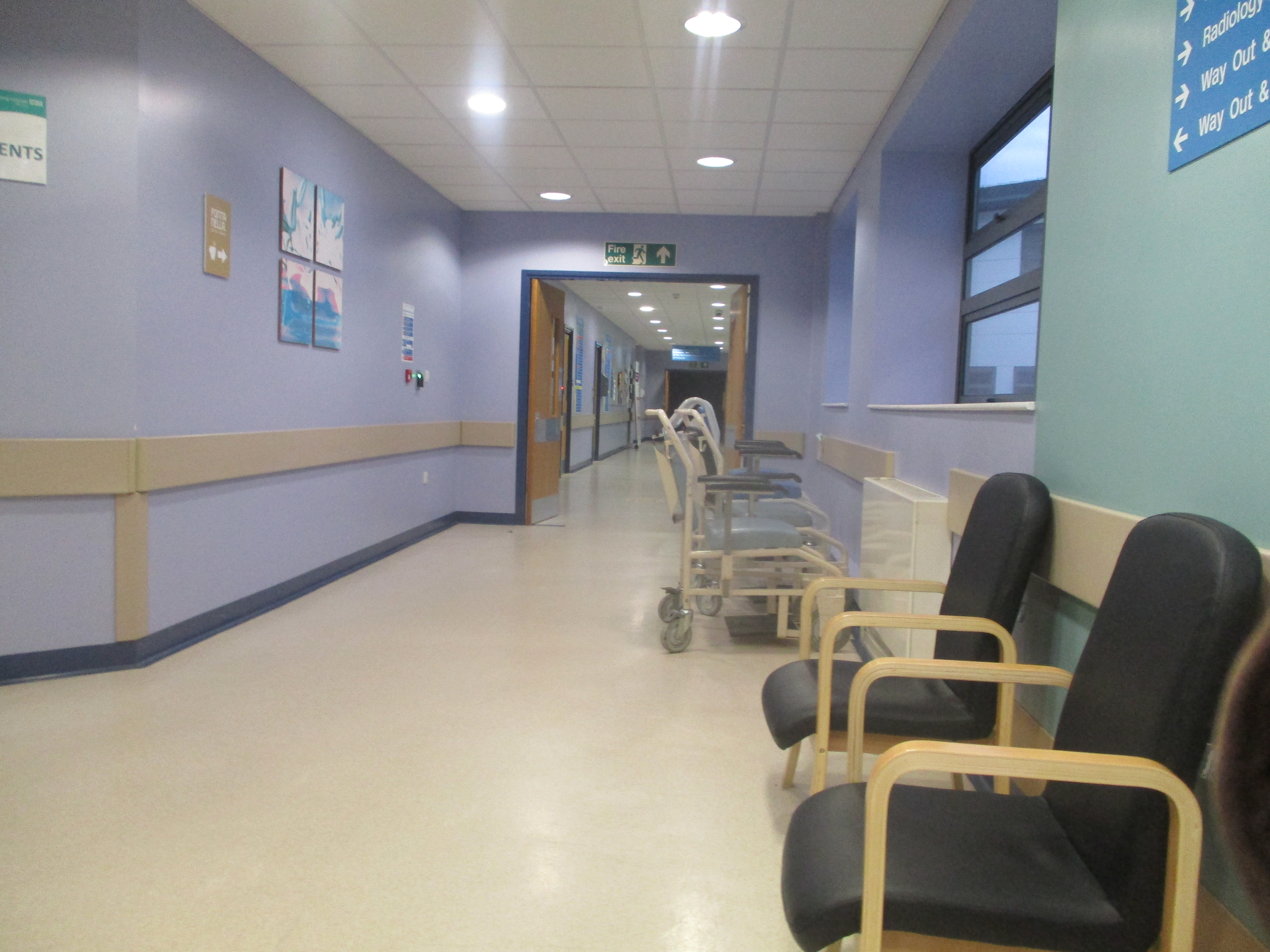
Interior of the new hospital

The facility has its origins in an infirmary built for the Wharfedale Union Workhouse on the Newall Carr Road in 1873. An infirmary with 70 beds was added in 1907 and was administered by the Wharfedale Board of Guardians until 1930. It went on to become the Otley County Institution and then became Otley County Hospital.

The facility joined the National Health Service as Otley County Hospital in 1948 and later became Wharfedale General Hospital. In the 1990s it became clear the existing building was unsuitable for purpose. A new hospital was commissioned and the old site redeveloped into an estate called Wharfedale Park, with many of the original buildings being converted into flats.

The new hospital, located just to the west of the old facility, was officially opened by the Princess Royal on 26 January 2005. The local Member of Parliament, Harold Best, was involved in securing the location of the hospital.

== See also ==
- List of hospitals in England
- Listed buildings in Otley
