= Burley in Wharfedale =

Village and civil parish in West Yorkshire, England

Coordinates: 53.9137°N 1.7480°W

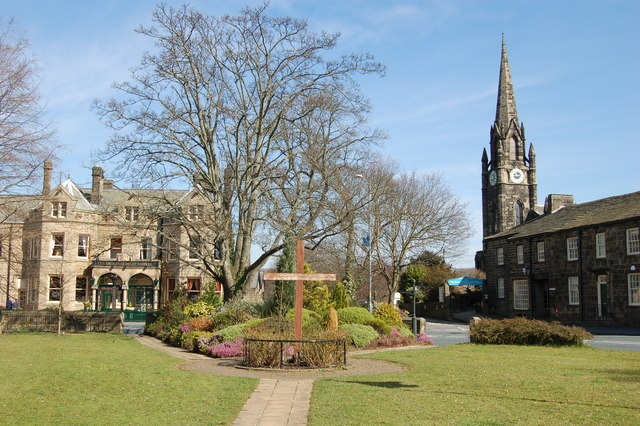
- Village green

- Location within West Yorkshire
- Population: 7,041 (2011 Census)
- OS grid reference: SE165464
  - London: 175 mi (282 km) SSE
- Civil parish: Burley
- Metropolitan borough: City of Bradford
- Metropolitan county: West Yorkshire
- Region: Yorkshire and the Humber
- Country: England
- Sovereign state: United Kingdom
- Post town: ILKLEY
- Postcode district: LS29
- Dialling code: 01943
- Police: West Yorkshire
- Fire: West Yorkshire
- Ambulance: Yorkshire
- UK Parliament: Shipley

Burley in Wharfedale is a village and civil parish within the City of Bradford in West Yorkshire, England, in the Wharfedale valley. In 2011, it had a population of 7,041.

The village is on the A65 road, 11 miles (18 km) north-west from Leeds, 8 miles (13 km) north from Bradford, 3 miles (5 km) from Ilkley and 2 miles (3 km) from Otley. The hamlet of Burley Woodhead at the foot of Burley Moor is 1 mile (1.6 km) to the south-west.

== Etymology ==
The name of Burley in Wharfedale is first attested in an eleventh-century copy of a charter issued in 972, as Burhleg. It appears in the Domesday Book of 1086 in the spellings Burgelei, Burgelay, Burghelai, and Burghelay. The comes from the Old English words burg ('fortification') and lēah ('open land in a wood'), and thus meant 'open land in a wood, characterised by a fortification'. The specification 'in Wharfedale', deployed to avoid ambiguity with the various other English places of the same name, is first attested during the reign of Edward I of England, in the forms Burghlay in Querfildale and Burghlay in Quervesdale.

== History ==
Burley in Wharfedale was originally a small agricultural community with likely Roman and Anglo-Saxon roots. Burley developed in the late 18th and 19th centuries into an industrial village with many residents employed at Greenholme Mills, cotton mills powered from a goit fed from the River Wharfe. The cotton mill no longer operates and has recently been converted to flats, but the goit is now utilised to provide hydro electric power, and a weir remains.

The development of industrial and commercial centres in the nearby cities of Leeds and Bradford, combined with rail and bus links, caused major changes to the village in the early 20th century. Council housing was built in the 1920s and 1950s, as the village became a dormitory settlement for the two cities. With developments in the second half of the 20th century, Burley became a prosperous but socially diverse village. The village has a high percentage of elderly and retired people, and young families attracted by job opportunities, local schools and new housing developments.

Burley was formerly a township and chapelry in the parish of Otley, from 1866 Burley in Wharfedale was a civil parish in its own right, on 1 April 1937 the parish was abolished and merged with Ilkley. In 1931 the parish had a population of 3961.

On 1 April 2006, following a petition to the local authority and permission from the Parliament, Burley became a separate parish again under the name "Burley".

== Geography ==
There was a public inquiry in July 1991 for the A65 bypass. Amey Construction built the 1.8-mile bypass for £5,547,467, from September 1993; it opened on 10 April 1995.

== Community ==
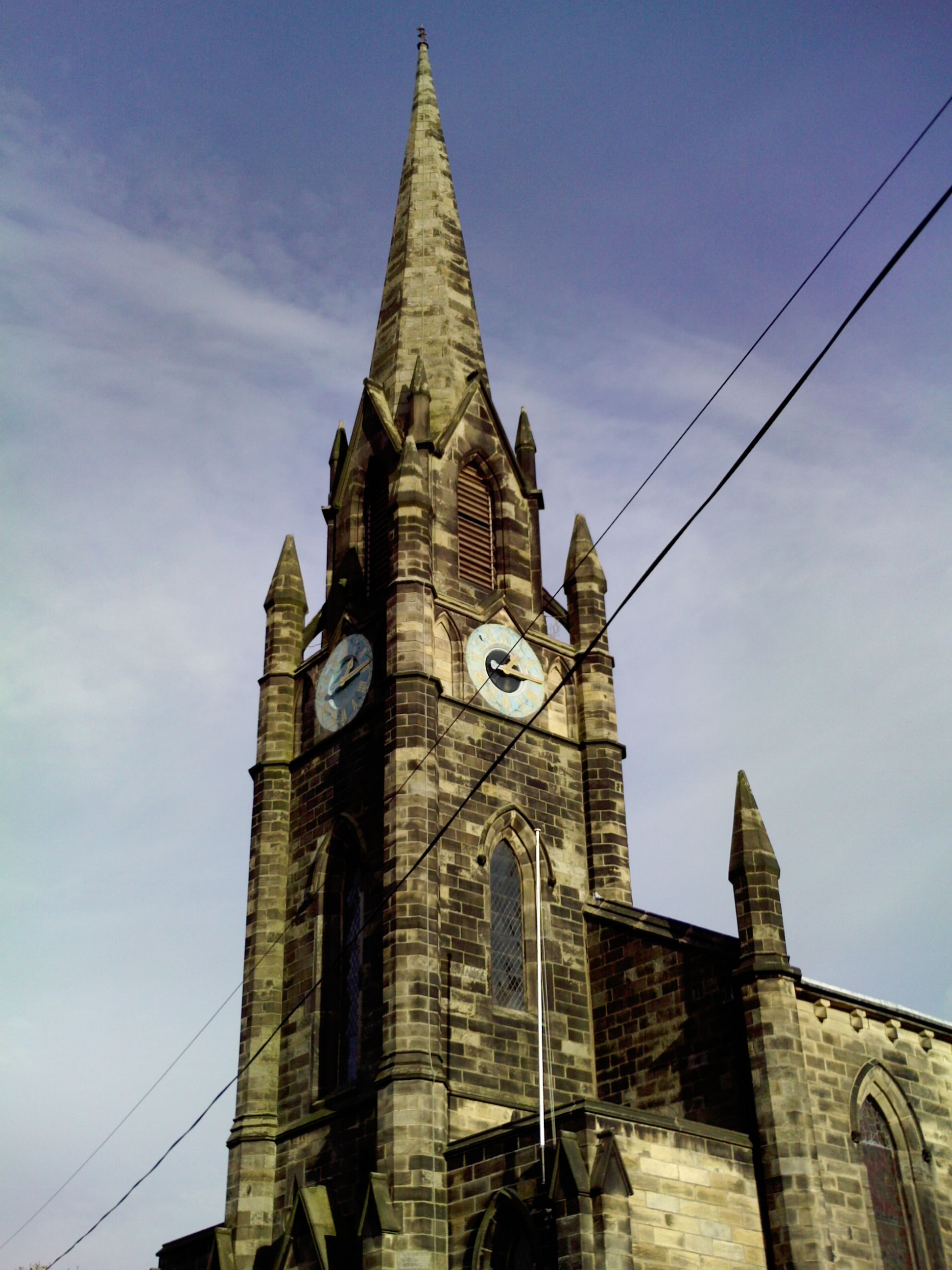
St Mary's Church tower and spire

Burley population is 7,041. With Menston, Burley is part of Wharfedale ward in the metropolitan borough of the City of Bradford.

The village contains a range of local businesses. Burley public buildings include the Queens' Hall, originally built as a lecture hall for mill workers. Recent work by community groups has resulted in developments including a new nature reserve, and the village green which contains a central water feature.

The village has two state primary schools, Burley and Woodhead Primary School, Burley Oaks Primary School, and Ghyll Royd School & Pre-School, a private primary and nursery school for girls and boys aged 2–11. The school was established in 1889 by Augustus Wooldridge Godby. Formerly an all boys school, it became a co-educational school in 1999 when it moved location to Greystone Manor.

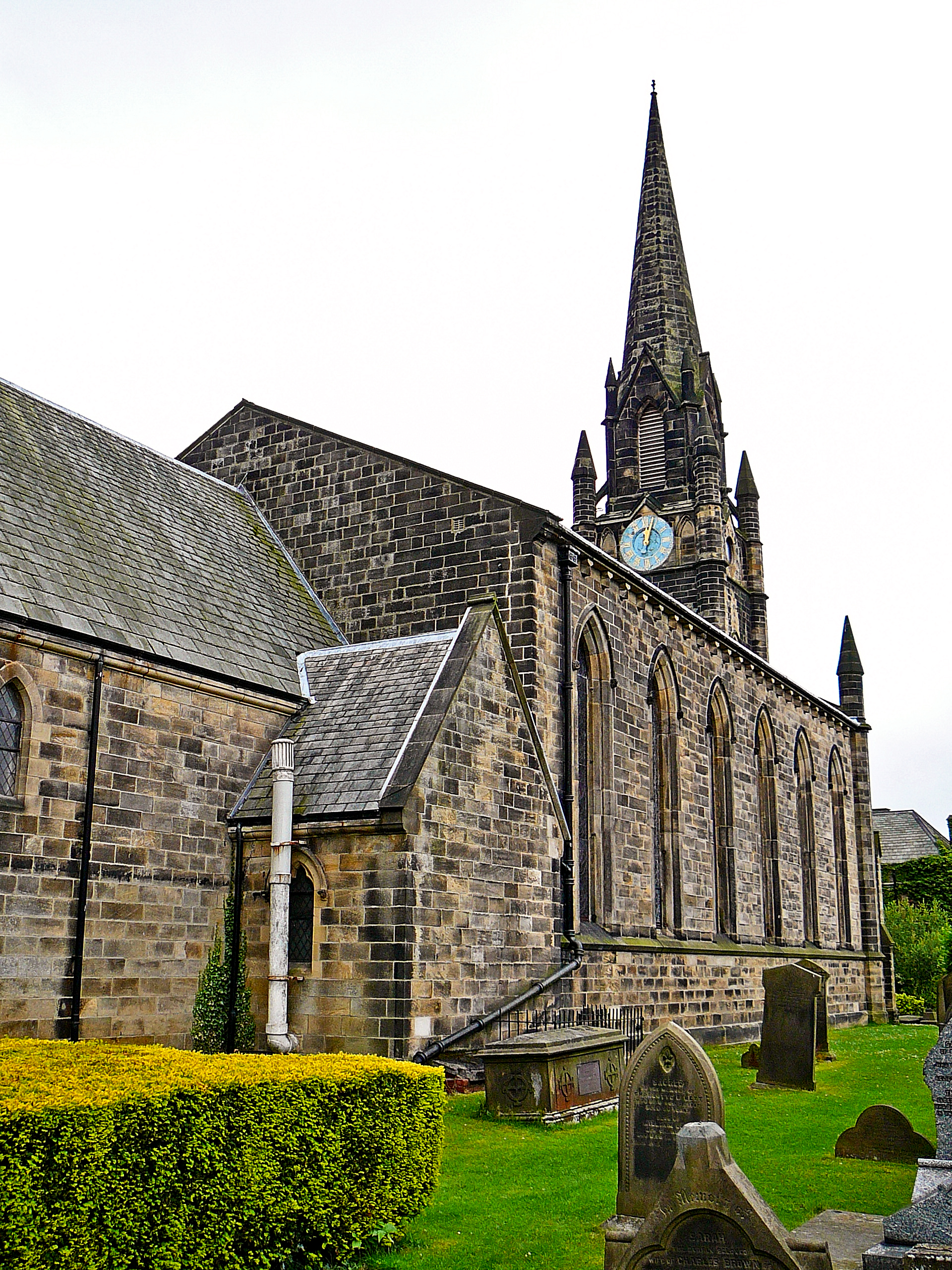
Rear of St Mary's Church

Burley's churches are those of the Anglicans, Calvinists and Methodists. The Roman Catholic church, dedicated to Saints John Fisher and Thomas More, is located between Burley in Wharfedale and Menston. The Anglican Parish Church is dedicated to St Mary.

Burley has a range of housing types and age, and terrace houses and cottages at the centre. Scalebor Park Hospital has been converted into private townhouses and flats.

Burley has a railway station on the Wharfedale Line, with direct trains to Leeds, Bradford and Ilkley, and links to other local urban areas.

== Sport and leisure ==
Burley-in-Wharfedale has an active grass roots football club (Burley Trojans). There are lots of opportunities in the immediate area for walking, cycling, fishing and bird watching.

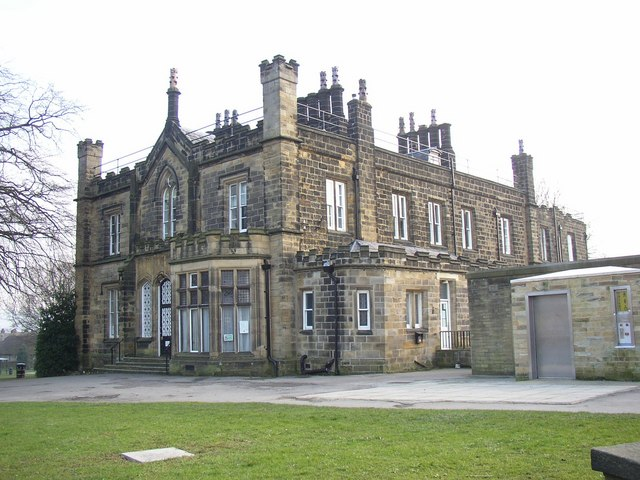
The Grange, Main Street, Burley in Wharfedale

== Notable people ==
Burley Woodhead was home to the television presenter Richard Whiteley until his death in 2005. It may have been the birthplace of Walter of Burley (1274–1344), a medieval English logician and theologian. William Forster, a reforming 19th-century politician, was part owner of a mill in the village and is buried there. Mark James, Ryder Cup captain in 1999, lives in the village. British cyclist Scott Thwaites is from Burley; in 2012, he became the Men's Elite Road Race Champion in the National road cycling championships held at Otley. Magistrate and treasurer to the County Courts of Yorkshire John Peele Clapham commissioned Burley Grange and the Salem Church on Main Street. England white-ball cricket captain Harry Brook also grew up in Burley-in-Wharfedale.

Tom Sumner was awarded an MBE in 2000 for "For services to the community in Burley-in-Wharfdale [sic], West Yorkshire."

== See also ==
- Listed buildings in Burley in Wharfedale
