= Listed buildings in Burley in Wharfedale =

Burley is a civil parish in the metropolitan borough of the City of Bradford, West Yorkshire, England. It contains 55 listed buildings that are recorded in the National Heritage List for England. Of these, one is listed at Grade I, the highest of the three grades, there are none at Grade II*, the middle grade, and the others are at Grade II, the lowest grade. The parish contains the village of Burley in Wharfedale, the smaller settlement of Burley Woodhead, and the surrounding countryside. Most of the listed buildings are houses cottages and associated structures, farmhouses and farm buildings. The other listed buildings include churches and a former chapel, a former school, a former corn mill and associated structures, and a hotel.

== Key ==
| Grade | Criteria |
|---|---|
| I | Buildings of exceptional interest, sometimes considered to be internationally important |
| II* | Particularly important buildings of more than special interest |
| II | Buildings of national importance and special interest |

== Buildings ==
| Name and location | Photograph | Date | Notes | Grade |
|---|---|---|---|---|
| 48 Main Street and 1, 3 and 5 York Road; 53.91309°N 1.74475°W | | 17th century | A block of cottages in stone, with stone slab roofs and two storeys. The doorway facing the street has a dated and initialled lintel, and there is another doorway with a dated Tudor arched lintel. The windows are mullioned, and some have been altered and sliding sash windows inserted. | II |
| Carr Bottom Farm House; 53.89631°N 1.77493°W | — | 17th century | A small stone farmhouse with metal gutter brackets and a stone slab roof. There are two storeys and two bays, and a single-storey lean-to extension on the right. On the front is a sundial, a single-light window and mullioned windows, all the windows with casements, and the doorway is in the extension. | II |
| Kennels Farmhouse; 53.91037°N 1.78048°W | — | 17th century | The house, which has been altered and extended to the right, is in stone with a stone slab roof. There are two storeys, the original part has three bays, and a central modern gabled porch. The doorway to the left has a large initialled and dated lintel, and the windows are mullioned. | II |
| Old Grammar School; 53.91365°N 1.75062°W | — | 17th century | The former school is in stone with a stone slate roof. The left part has one storey, and the smaller right part has two, all under the same roof. On the front is a doorway, to the left are two mullioned and transomed windows, and to the right is a mullioned window in each floor. All the windows have hood moulds. | II |
| Plane Tree Farm House; 53.90322°N 1.76932°W | — | 17th century | The farmhouse, which was extended in the 18th century, is in stone with wide-spaced gutter blocks, a stone slab roof with kneelers, and two storeys. Most of the windows are 18th-century sashes in moulded architraves, and in the south front is a 17th-century mullioned window, with a mullion removed, and a 17th-century doorway. | II |
| Stead Farm; 53.91125°N 1.78400°W | — | 17th century | A small farmhouse in stone with a stone slab roof. There are two storeys and three bays. In the centre is a gabled porch, the doorway has a lintel with a datestone above, and the windows are mullioned with some mullions removed. | II |
| Stead Hall Farmhouse; 53.91069°N 1.78003°W | — | 17th century | A small stone farmhouse with a stone slab roof, and two storeys. The central doorway has a Tudor arched head, and the windows are mullioned, with some mullions removed and sash windows inserted. | II |
| Turnpike Farm House; 53.89555°N 1.76760°W | — | 17th century | A small stone farmhouse that has a stone slab roof with kneelers, and two storeys. On the front is a gabled porch with a re-set datestone, and the windows are mullioned, one with a cambered lintel. | II |
| Former barn, Turnpike Farm; 53.89560°N 1.76742°W | — | 17th century | The barn, which has been converted for residential use, is in stone with a stone slab roof. There are two storeys, and the openings include a segmental arch on the north side. | II |
| Goit Stock Farm House; 53.90935°N 1.73851°W | — | Late 17th century | A stone farmhouse with a string course, and a stone slab roof with coped gables. There are two storeys and three bays. In the centre is a doorway, the windows are mullioned, and there is a hood mould over the ground floor openings. | II |
| Dial House; 53.91268°N 1.74327°W | | c. 1690 | A stone house with a stone slate roof and kneelers. There are two storeys and three bays. The windows are mullioned, with some mullions removed and sash windows inserted. Above the ground floor windows and the doorway is a continuous hood mould. In the upper floor is a dated sundial, which is probably re-set. | II |
| 79 Main Street; 53.91315°N 1.74722°W | — | Early 18th century (possible) | A stone house with moulded gutter blocks and a stone slab roof with coped gables. There are three storeys and two bays. The central doorway has massive slab surrounds, and the windows on the front are mullioned with two lights. At the rear are three large windows with canted sides. | II |
| Corn Mill Cottage; 53.91305°N 1.74089°W | — | Early 18th century (probable) | A stone cottage with a stone slab roof, two storeys and four bays. On the front is a doorway and sash windows, and at the east end is a doorway with a moulded architrave. | II |
| Corn Mill Cottage Barn; 53.91291°N 1.74089°W | — | 1738 | The barn, at right angles to the cottage, is in stone with a stone slab roof and two storeys. It contains an archway with a depressed head and a rusticated surround. On the roof is an initialled and dated weather vane. | II |
| Black Bull Farm House; 53.91927°N 1.76019°W | — | 18th century (probable) | A stone farmhouse with a stone slate roof. It has two storeys and three bays. There is one single-light window, and the other windows are mullioned. | II |
| Outbuilding, Black Bull Farm; 53.91938°N 1.76042°W | — | 18th century (probable) | The outbuilding is in stone with stone slab roofs. There are two storeys and an L-shaped plan, with two ranges at right angles. The main range contains a large segmental-arched entry, and the other range has coped gables with kneelers, small windows, and a larger opening in the gable end. | II |
| Burley Hall; 53.91274°N 1.74001°W | | 18th century | A large stone house with deeply projecting eaves on elongated brackets, and a hipped stone slab roof. There are two storeys and an L-shaped plan, with an east range of eight bays. On this front is a bow window with a three-light window above, and the other windows are sashes with hood moulds. On the north front is a porch in Gothic Revival style with a pointed archway and a carved frieze. | II |
| Former orchard walls, Burley Hall; 53.91240°N 1.73990°W | — | 18th century (possible) | The walls are in brick, and enclose the former orchard on the east, west and south sides. | II |
| Garden wall, Burley Hall; 53.91300°N 1.74002°W | — | 18th century (probable) | The wall is on the north side of the garden. It is a high wall in stone. | II |
| Burley Lodge; 53.91131°N 1.74151°W | | 18th century | A stone house with two storeys and three wide bays, the middle bay projecting under a pediment. In the centre is a doorway in a semicircular arch, with columns, a fanlight and a lintel with triglyphs, and above are two windows. The outer bays contain windows with moulded architraves. On the right return is a semicircular bay window. | II |
| Barn, Carr Bottom Farm; 53.89633°N 1.77510°W | — | 18th century (probable) | The barn, which is attached to the farmhouse, is in stone with a stone slab roof. On the south side is a large opening with a segmental head. | II |
| Chevin House and Highway Cottage; 53.91141°N 1.74175°W | | 18th century | The building is in stone with hipped stone slab roofs and two storeys. The block facing the street has a symmetrical front of three bays. In the centre, in a flat arched-recess, is a round-arched doorway with a semicircular fanlight. Above it is a circular window, and in the outer bays are sash windows. On the right and extending to the rear, is a wing incorporated from Burley Lodge. This has a doorway in the front facing the road, and the south front has three bays and contains windows in Gothic style. | II |
| Corn Mill; 53.91323°N 1.74061°W | — | 18th century | The mill, later used for other purposes, is in stone with a stone slab roof. The main block has three storeys and four bays, there is a two-storey extension to the east with buttresses, a diagonal extension to the south, and an extension for the waterwheel on the north side. | II |
| Barn, Goit Stock Farm; 53.90913°N 1.73843°W | — | 18th century | The barn is in stone with a string course, and a stone slab roof with coped gables. In the centre is a double doorway with a straight head and impost blocks. Also on the front are two doorways, a window with two mullions, and at a higher level are two round windows. | II |
| Green Gate Farm House; 53.90922°N 1.72882°W | — | 18th century (probable) | A stone farmhouse with moulded gutter blocks and a stone slab roof. There are two storeys and a single-storey gabled projection on the left. On the front are two doorways, one blocked, some windows are sashes and others are fixed. | II |
| Barn, Green Gate Farm; 53.90911°N 1.72892°W | — | 18th century (probable) | The barn is attached to the farmhouse and continues the range. It is in stone with metal gutter brackets and has a stone slate roof. On the west front is a doorway with a straight head. | II |
| Hill Top House; 53.91435°N 1.75242°W | — | 18th century | A stone house with quoins and a stone slate roof with kneelers. There are two storeys and three bays. In the centre is a doorway, above which is an elliptical window. The windows in the outer bays have architraves and are mullioned with two lights. | II |
| Stoney Royd; 53.91493°N 1.75261°W | — | 18th century | A pair of stone cottages, rendered on the left gable end, with bands, two storeys and four bays. On the front are two doorways, the windows in the left bay are sashes, the others being replacements, and in the rear is a round-headed window with Gothic glazing. | II |
| Viaduct and Bridge, Mill Pond; 53.91261°N 1.74190°W | — | 18th century (possible) | The viaduct and bridge are in stone, and carry a path over the outflow from the mill pond. The path is flanked by low stone walls with grooved coping, and the bridge consists of a single round-headed arch. | II |
| Burley House; 53.91082°N 1.74229°W | | 1783 | A stone house with string courses, open balustrading over the ground floor, a cornice, a parapet with urns, and a hipped roof. There are two storeys and a symmetrical east front of five bays, the middle three bays projecting under a modillioned pediment with a finial, and containing an oval window in the tympanum. In the centre is a doorway with attached Tuscan columns and a pediment, and the windows are sashes. In the middle of the south front is a two-storey canted bay window, and in the north front is a Venetian window in an arch. To the west is a narrower two-story extension. | I |
| Former coach house, Burley House; 53.91110°N 1.74247°W | — | 1783 (probable) | The former coach house is in stone, with modillions and a stone slab roof with coped gables and kneelers. There are two storeys. | II |
| Former stables, Burley House; 53.91096°N 1.74251°W | — | 1783 | The stables, which have been altered, are in stone with a stone slab roof. There are two storeys, and an L-shaped plan with two ranges at right angles. The remaining original features include modillions, three roundels in the upper storey, the middle one with a keystone, a lunette, and a Venetian window. | II |
| 50 and 52 Main Street; 53.91312°N 1.74502°W | — | c. 1800 | A pair of stone houses that have a stone slab roof with coped gables and kneelers. There are two storeys and three bays. The ground floor window in the right bay has been converted into a shop window with a moulded wooden fascia on brackets, and the other windows are mullioned with three lights, the central light wider. | II |
| 71 Main Street; 53.91313°N 1.74693°W | — | c. 1800 (probable) | A stone house with the gable end facing the street, it has a modillion eaves cornice forming a pedimented gable, and a slate roof. There are two storeys and an attic, and one bay. The doorway to the left has a stone surround, to the right is a window with pilasters and a moulded cornice, the upper floor contains a sash window, and in the attic is a single-light window. | II |
| 73–77 Main Street; 53.91311°N 1.74705°W | — | c. 1800 (probable) | A row of three stone cottages, with a modillion eaves cornice and a stone slab roof. There are two storeys, and each cottage has one bay. The doorways and the windows, which have been altered, have stone surrounds. | II |
| School Hall; 53.90199°N 1.76842°W | — | c. 1800 | The building is in stone with a stone slab roof. There is one tall storey, and on the east front is a gabled extension. Some windows are round-headed with impost blocks and keystones, and others are mullioned and transomed. | II |
| 86–112 Main Street; 53.91411°N 1.75015°W | — | c. 1820 | A terrace of twelve stone houses with a moulded wooden cornice on moulded brackets and a slate roof. There are two storeys, and each house has two bays, and a central doorway with a fanlight. Most of the windows are sashes, some have been altered, and some houses have added gabled porches. | II |
| Gate piers, Greenholme Estate; 53.91390°N 1.74640°W | | 1820 | The three gate piers are in stone and about 11 feet (3.4 m) high. They have a square section and are built of blocks with chamfered edges on a plinth. Each pier has an entablature, a cornice, and a tall finial. | II |
| 4, 6 and 8 Main Street; 53.91159°N 1.74175°W | | Early 19th century | A row of three cottages at the end of a terrace, with gutter brackets, and s stone slab roof with coped gables. There are two storeys, and each house has one bay. The doorways have triple-fluted jambs and a segmental pediment, and the windows are sashes. Nos 6 and 8 have a single step and railings. | II |
| 10 and 12 Main Street; 53.91168°N 1.74172°W | — | Early 19th century | A pair of stone cottages in a terrace, with gutter brackets and a stone slab roof. There are two storeys, and each house has one bay. The doorways have triple-fluted jambs and a segmental pediment, and the windows are sashes. | II |
| 16 Main Street; 53.91177°N 1.74169°W | | Early 19th century | A pair of stone cottages at the end of a terrace, later combined, with moulded gutter brackets and a stone slab roof with a coped gable and kneelers on the left. There are two storeys and three bays. The doorway has triple-fluted jambs and a segmental pediment. The older windows are sashes and in the ground floor some have been replaced by a bow window. | II |
| 24–30 Main Street and 2 Post Office Yard; 53.91217°N 1.74172°W | | Early 19th century | A terrace of stone cottages with paired gutter blocks and a stone slab roof. There are two storeys, a front of seven bays, the first two bays slightly recessed, and a rear wing of three bays. On the front are two doorways with fanlights, and flat hoods on moulded brackets. In the ground floor of the first bay is a bow window, and the other windows are sashes. In the third bay is a flat-headed carriage entrance, above which is a wrought iron lamp holder. | II |
| Wall, The Malt Shovel Hotel; 53.91237°N 1.74185°W | — | Early 19th century (probable) | The wall encloses an area to the east of the hotel. At the west end, adjoining the hotel, is a short embattled section about 6 feet (1.8 m) high containing a blind ogee arch, an arrow slit, and a mounting block. From it, a low wall with semicircular coping runs east along Main Street, and turns north along Corn Mill Lane, this part with peaked coping. | II |
| Gate piers and gates, Burley Hall; 53.91270°N 1.74123°W | — | Early to mid 19th century (probable) | The gate piers at the entrance to the drive are in stone, with a square section and pyramidal caps. The gates are mainly in wood and are surmounted by a decorative metal frieze with spear finials. | II |
| 81, 83, 85 and 87 Main Street; 53.91327°N 1.74736°W | — | c. 1840 (probable) | A row of four stone shops with quoins, gutter blocks, and a stone slate roof. There are two storeys, and each shop has one bay. In the ground floor are shop fronts, the three shops on the left having windows with round-arched lights, and the shop on the right with a modern front. The upper floor contains sash windows with stone surrounds and sills on moulded brackets. | II |
| Gazebo; 53.91347°N 1.74934°W | | 1840 (probable) | The gazebo or summer house is in the grounds of The Grange, to the east of the house. It is in stone, with an octagonal plan, and has a slate roof. The sides are glazed, the buttresses rise to form pinnacles, and the parapet is embattled. There is a doorway on the west side. | II |
| The Grange; 53.91338°N 1.74983°W | | 1840 | A large stone house in Gothic Revival style, with corner turrets and two storeys. The entrance front has three bays, a central doorway with a fanlight, and a two-light window and a gable above. In the right bay is a canted bay window with an embattled parapet. The windows are mullioned, some also with transoms. | II |
| St Mary's Church; 53.91248°N 1.74128°W | | 1841–43 | The chancel was enlarged or added in 1870 when the west gallery was removed. The church is built in stone in Early English style, and consists of a nave, a chancel, and a west steeple. The steeple has a tower with flanking porches, a gabled west door, clock faces, and buttresses rising to form pinnacles, from which flying buttresses connect them to an octagonal spire. The windows in the tower and the body of the church are lancets, and the east window has three lights. | II |
| Saxon Lodge; 53.92093°N 1.77567°W | — | Mid 19th century | The lodge is in stone, with projecting eaves on elongated brackets, and a slate roof. There are two storeys, one bay, and flanking gabled wings. The central doorway has a moulded hood on brackets, and the windows are sashes. Each of the wings has a five-light bay window with a dentilled cornice. | II |
| Gate piers, Saxon Lodge; 53.92100°N 1.77573°W | — | Mid 19th century (probable) | The gate piers flank the entrance to the drive. They are in stone, they are rusticated, and have dentilled heads. | II |
| Former Wesleyan Chapel; 53.91254°N 1.74449°W | | c. 1860 | The chapel, later used for other purposes, is in stone with a stone slate roof, the gable end facing the street and pedimented, with a roundel in the tympanum. There are two storeys, a front of three bays, and four bays along the sides. The central round-arched doorway has a moulded architrave and a fanlight. The windows are also round-arched, those in the ground floor with impost bands, and those in the upper floor with impost blocks and keystones. The windows along the sides have flat heads. | II |
| Methodist Church; 53.91260°N 1.74487°W | | 1867–68 | The church was designed by Lockwood and Mawson in Gothic style. It is in stone with a slate roof. On the front is a coped gable under which is a large rose window. In the centre is a double doorway with round-arched heads and slender shafts. The front of the church is flanked by squat towers with buttresses, and at the stepped tops are pierced quatrefoil parapets and pyramidal roofs. Along the sides are paired cusped lancet windows with cinquefoil heads and a continuous hood mould. | II |
| 54, 56 and 58 Main Street; 53.91316°N 1.74525°W | | 1871 | A row of three stone houses with slate roofs. There are two storeys, and each house has a gable with a finial. In the ground floor of the left house is a doorway with a fanlight and a Tudor arched head, and to the right is a canted bay window. The other houses have gabled porches and mullioned and transomed windows with a continuous hood mould. The upper floor contains mullioned windows and single-light windows with round-arched lights, all with hood moulds. In the middle gable is a panel with a shaped head, and the other gables contain circular motifs. | II |
| The Malt Shovel Hotel; 53.91250°N 1.74224°W | | 1880 | The hotel is in stone with a slate roof. There are two storeys and attics, and a front of five bays. The entrance is in the fourth bay, and has a porch with two arches and columns with foliage capitals, above which is an inscribed frieze. The flanking bays are canted, and all three bays have gabled dormers with finials, and pierced quatrefoil parapets between. The left bay is gabled, and contains an arched opening with a keystone, and above is an oriel window. | II |
| West Lodge; 53.90624°N 1.75509°W | — | c. 1900 | A large house, later used for other purposes, it is in stone, partly rendered, and has a hipped tiled mansard roof. The southeast front has a recessed centre containing a doorway with a fanlight and a transomed window, above which are bracketed eaves and a dormer. This is flanked by two-storey bays with shaped gables, containing curved bay windows. Elsewhere are similar windows, mullioned windows, and sash windows. To the right is a three-storey service wing. | II |
