= Burley Hydro =

Hydroelectric power station in West Yorkshire, England

Greenholme Mill Hydro
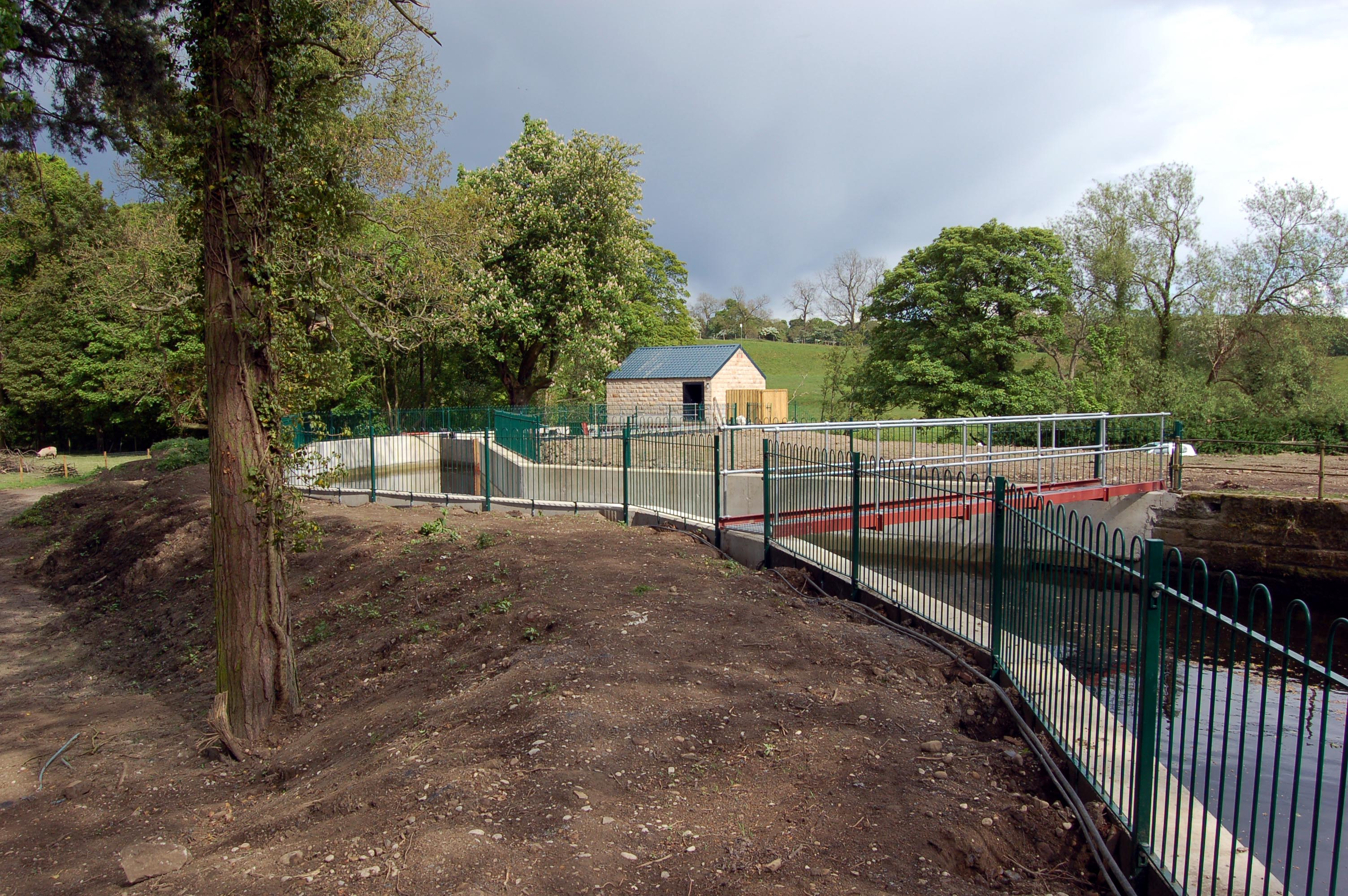
- Location within West Yorkshire
- Official name: Burley Hydro
- Country: England
- Location: Burley-in-Wharfedale
- Coordinates: 53°55′16.9″N 1°44′46.5″W
- Status: Operational
- Construction began: 2010
- Commission date: August 2011
- Construction cost: £850,000
- Owners: DHP; TLS
- Operator: Wharfedale Hydropower

Power generation
- Nameplate capacity: 330 kW
- Annual net output: 1,400 MWh

Burley Hydro Scheme, also known as Greenholme Mill Hydro, is a micro hydroelectric scheme installed on the River Wharfe at Burley-in-Wharfedale, West Yorkshire, England. The power output of the hydro scheme is 330 kW with an annual output of 1,400 MWh and is the fourth hydro scheme on the river after the opening of similar power plants at Linton near Grassington, and two further downstream from Burley at Pool-in-Wharfedale and Garnett Wharfe at Otley. All of these schemes have been located on sites previously used to generate power from the water flow.

== History ==
The site was previously used as a water mill from the 1790s up until 1966, when the mill that worked cotton, Greenholme Mill, went out of business. In 2010, a joint venture between Derwent Hydro Power (DHP) and Trade Link Solutions (TLS), developed a new turbine on the site to generate electricity from the water passing through the old mill race. The old mill race was diverted slightly, but cuts a path east of the River Wharfe whilst the main body of the river curves north east and then around to the south in a horseshoe shape. The mill race had silted up and had to be cleared before the new turbine plant could generate power.

The plant generates enough electricity to power between 300–340 homes per year, from a flow of 350 cubic feet (10 m^{3}) per second and saves over 640 tonnes (710 tons) of carbon dioxide emissions being pumped into the environment each year. The capacity of the plant is 1,400 MWh per year. At the same time as the turbine house was being built, a fish pass was installed to help with the bio-diversity of the river.

The plant at Burley is the fourth scheme of its kind to be built on the River Wharfe after Linton Falls re-opened near Grassington and a similar scheme to the one at Burley opened in 2010 at Pool-in-Wharfedale, though the one at Pool has a third of the generating capacity (100 kWh). A fourth plant was reconditioned at an old papermill at Garnett Wharfe in Otley in 2016 as part of an estate build of 240 homes. Garnett Wharfe has a similar power output to Burley.

Whereas other schemes have used Archimedes' screws in a reverse direction (IE the water flowing through downstream turns the screws and generates electricity), the turbine plant at Burley houses a Kaplan Turbine, which means the water flowing through turns two blades and as it does so, it changes pressure. This requires the inward flow to always have a good head of water. Measures have taken to prevent water loss at Burley even though the turbine will not work when there is a low flow of water such as in a dry summer.

The plant was opened by Phillip Davies MP in August 2011 and is designed to feed electricity into the National Grid.
