= John Peele Clapham =

Justice of the peace for the West Riding of Yorkshire

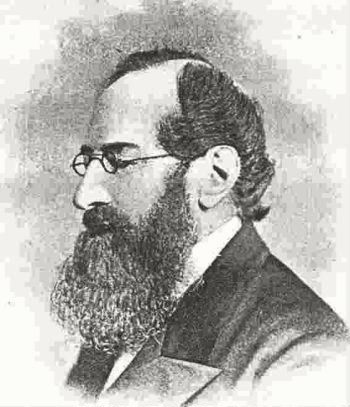
- John Peele Clapham J.P., 1840s
- Born: 7 July 1801; Leeds, West Riding of Yorkshire
- Died: 19 November 1875 (aged 74); Ilkley, West Riding of Yorkshire
- Occupations: Solicitor; Justice of the peace Treasurer to the county courts
- Known for: Instrumental in founding West Park Congregational Church, Harrogate; Salem Church, Burley in Wharfedale
- Notable work: The Sunday School Union Hymn Book, 1833

Signature
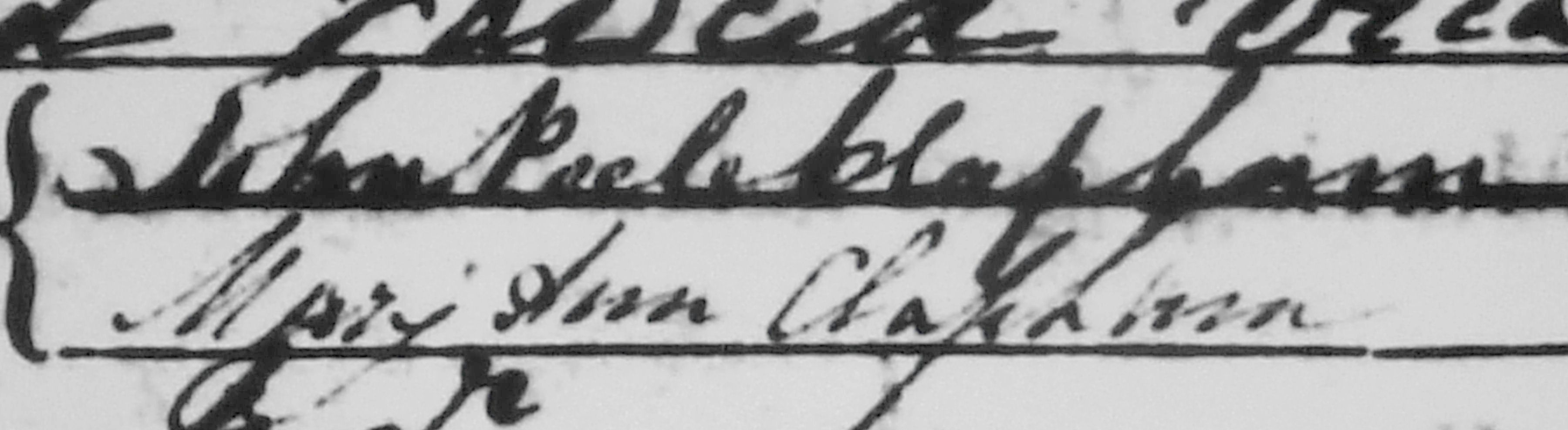

John Peele Clapham (7 July 1801 – 19 November 1875), from Leeds, West Riding of Yorkshire, was a justice of the peace for the West Riding of Yorkshire, and treasurer for the county courts of Yorkshire.

Although he abandoned a medical career in the 1820s, "lost a fortune" in 1842 and "in bodily health he was never strong," he was a philanthropist who commissioned, subscribed to or supported various religious buildings and causes in his lifetime. Among other achievements he edited the Sunday School Union Hymn Book in 1833, commissioned the building of Salem Chapel on his land in 1839–1840 and led the building committee of West Park Congregational Church, Harrogate in 1861–1862. The hymn book "passed through many editions, and ... had a very large circulation."

== Historical background context ==
The following gives some indication of how Clapham as a young man could afford higher education and a Grand Tour, how he likely inherited the fortune that he then lost, and what was the cultural and ethical background which contributed to his life's work of setting up church buildings and Sunday schools. (Note: That is to say, the family, educational and cultural background of Clapham in this article is not about genealogy, but about being appropriate to support the reader's understanding of a notable topic.) Clapham's great grandfather John Clapham (c. 1724 – 21 February 1792), a cloth dresser, "lies opposite the south transept of Leeds Parish Church." Clapham's grandfather John Clapham (c. 1749 – Penzance 16 December 1829) was "one of the earliest Friends, a steady and liberal supporter of the Bible, Missionary and Religious Tract societies," and treasurer of the Leeds Infirmary. John Clapham and his eldest son William Clapham (22 February 1775 – 12 October 1810), known for their "uprightness and integrity," were cloth merchants working from Hunslet Lane, Leeds, England.

For nearly a century the Claphams were distinguished among the leading men of the borough, especially by their attachment to the principles of civil and religious liberty and the cause of education and improvement. They were evangelical dissenters of the independent communion, and took a foremost part among the supporters of the colleges, chapels and schools of the denomination throughout Yorkshire, as well as all unsectarian associations for religious and charitable objects at home and abroad. They were also among the leaders in the long conflict and ultimate victory on behalf of Parliamentary Reform, the abolition of the disabilities of Dissenters and Roman Catholics, [slave] emancipation &c.

== Personal life ==
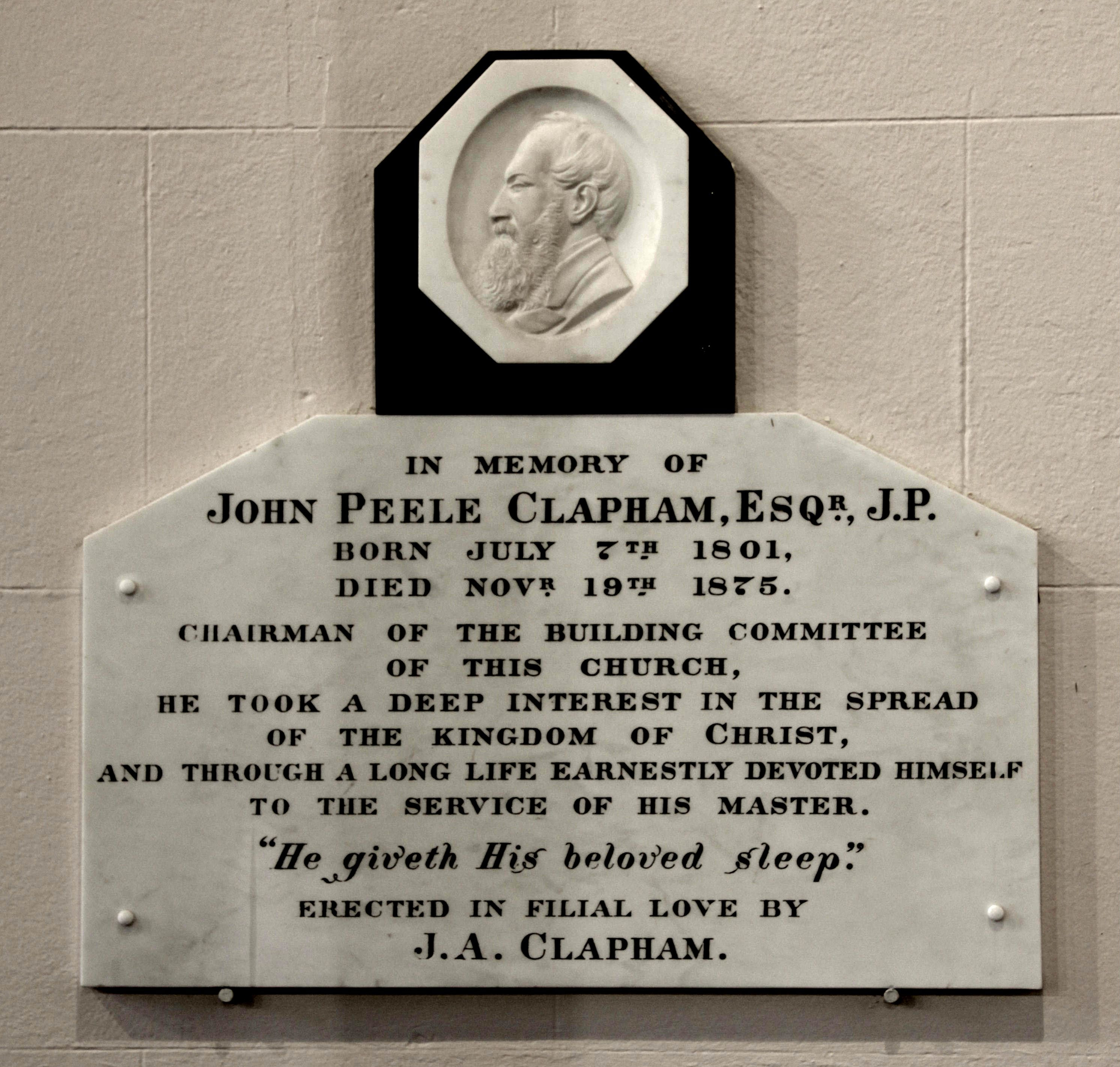
Clapham's memorial plaque, erected by his son John Arthur

John Peele Clapham JP (Hunslet 7 July 1801 – Ilkley 19 November 1875) was born in Hunslet Lane, Leeds, the son of Leeds cloth merchant William Clapham, and Martha Peele (c. 1778 – 24 June 1808). Clapham attended Leaf Square Grammar School, a dissenting academy at Manchester, alongside his lifelong friend Edward Baines MP. He studied at the University of Glasgow and began a medical career at St Thomas' Hospital, London. For health reasons, he then made a Grand Tour of Europe, including Switzerland and Rome.

Clapham married Mary Ann Clapham (Hunslet 1806 or 1807 – Ilkley 7 October 1878), daughter of Leeds magistrate and merchant John Clapham, at St Peter's Church, Leeds, on 11 April 1827, (Note: The original marriage certificate of John and Mary Ann Clapham gives the date as 11 April 1827, although other sources state 4 April 1827. It is possible that this couple were cousins.) They had at least seven children: Mary (b. c. 1828), Emma (18 October 1830 – Southport 4 February 1899), William Henry (25 February 1833 – 19 August 1906) John Arthur (6 February 1835 – 28 December 1911), Anne (b.ca.1844), Frederick (ca.1846 – 14 May 1855), and Martha Clapham (b.ca.1848). When Mary Ann became ill in 1866, the couple moved to St Leonards-on-Sea, but came north again to the large villa of Brookside, Otley, where they both spent their last days. "In bodily health he was never strong; but by an active life and temperate living he survived the three score and ten."

== Career ==
In 1842 Clapham "lost a fortune" in investments due to the failure of the shippers Bowden's of Hull. (Note: It is not known whether he had invested in James Shrapnell Bowden's Hull whaler Brunswick which went down in 1842"The Whaleship 'Brunswick' – John Ward (1823)". hoaportal.york.ac.uk. History of art research portal.) In 1845 his friend George Howard, 7th Earl of Carlisle appointed him to a position that he was to hold for life: treasurer of County Courts for Yorkshire. He had responsibility for the finances of 17 county courts, including Sheffield, York and Wakefield. Clapham qualified as a Justice of the Peace for the West Riding of Yorkshire at Knaresborough, Harrogate and Otley in August 1848.

== Public life ==
Clapham was "one of the first aldermen and magistrates under the reformed municipal corporation." He was not a great public speaker, but "his cultivated mind and sound judgement more than compensated for any deficiency." He was "respected and trusted," and a "conscientious and honest worker." He took a "deep interest" in his work with the religious education of children. He was instrumental in the establishment of Sunday schools in the area, and he edited a compilation of hymns for children.

In political and religious life he was ever to the fore. Education, whether religious or secular, had his warmest support, and he assisted schools and colleges to the best of his powers. He was one of the founders of the Ilkley Charity, now called the Ilkley Hospital, and loved to unite with other denominations in any good work. Gifted with considerable poetical powers, he brought his taste and judgment before the public in the editorship of the Leeds Sunday School Hymn Book, which has passed through many editions, and has had a very large circulation. Monuments to his memory have been erected in Harrogate and Burley-in-Wharfedale. (Note: The Harrogate monument is a wall plaque inside West Park United Reformed Church, Harrogate. The whereabouts of the Burley in Wharfedale monument is unknown, although it is possibly inside the Salem Chapel on Main Street.)

== Published works ==
- Clapham, John Peele, ed. (1833). Hymns Selected and Original for the use of Teachers and Scholars or The Sunday School Union Hymn Book (1 ed.). Leeds: John Heaton.
- Clapham, John Peele, ed. (1844). The Union Hymn Book for the Use of Sunday Schools (online) (9 ed.). Oxford, England: Oxford University.

== Buildings ==
=== Residences ===
Clapham founded or was connected with several notable buildings. Having arrived from Leeds, he rented Burley Hall in Burley in Wharfedale from 1834, until at least 1841, and commissioned Burley Grange in 1840 in the same village, where he lived between 1841 and 1849. Between 1849 and 1859 he was living in Hanover Street, Leeds, to be nearer his place of work as county court treasurer. In 1861 he was living in Queen Parade, Bilton, Harrogate. By the end of his life he was living at Brookside, Ilkley, a seven-bedroom house with a dining room, drawing room and library.

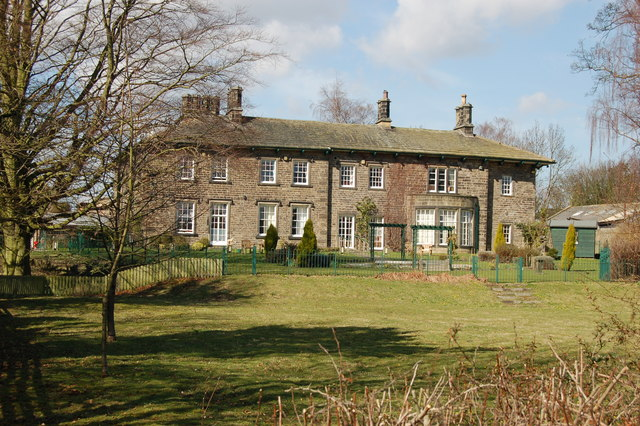
Burley Hall, 2008

=== Sunday schools in Leeds, before 1835 ===
Clapham founded several Sunday schools for the children of mechanics in Leeds.

=== Sunday school above Post Office Yard, Burley in Wharfedale, 1835 ===
In 1835, Clapham and the curate from St Mary's converted the upper storey of three cottages at Post Office Yard into a non-denominational Sunday School. It closed in 1837 when a new curate, hired "at a liberal salary" by Mrs Anderton of Burley House, started a rival ecumenical Sunday school in Back Lane. Clapham later built the schoolroom close to the Salem chapel to replace his earlier one. Another version of this story says that in the early 1830s Clapham was superintendent of the Queen Street Sunday School when the vicar of St Mary's asked him to open and run a village school. However a new curate tried to make the new venture an Anglican school. The Sunday School teachers wanted a non-denominational school, and this was why he saw fit to commission the Salem Chapel and its Sunday school with support from "Leeds, Bradford and elsewhere."

=== Burley Grange, 1839–1840 ===
Burley Grange (now The Grange) replaced a previous Burley Grange which was still standing in 1837. The new one was commissioned by Claphem and completed in 1840, although at the beginning of 1841 he was still living at Burley Hall. In 1849 Burley Grange was sold, to be later owned by Standfield, Emley and Hodson among others. Burley Urban District Council (which from 1937 was Ilkley Urban District Council) bought it in 1905. Thus it became the council office, the public library, and Grange Men's Club. It was then purchased by Bradford College for adult education, and closed again in 2006. Alan Hayes of Business Support and Development purchased Burley Grange in January 2009 with the intention of reopening it in the following August as a centre for business and education.

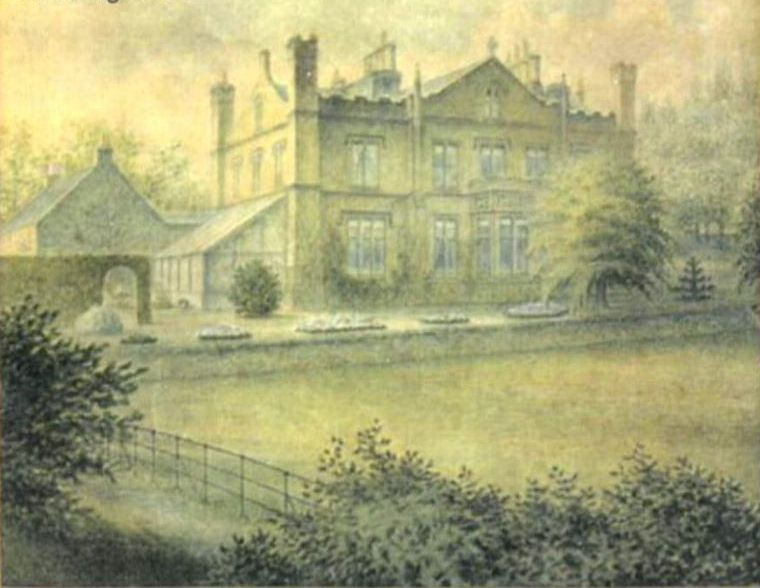
Burley Grange, east side 1850

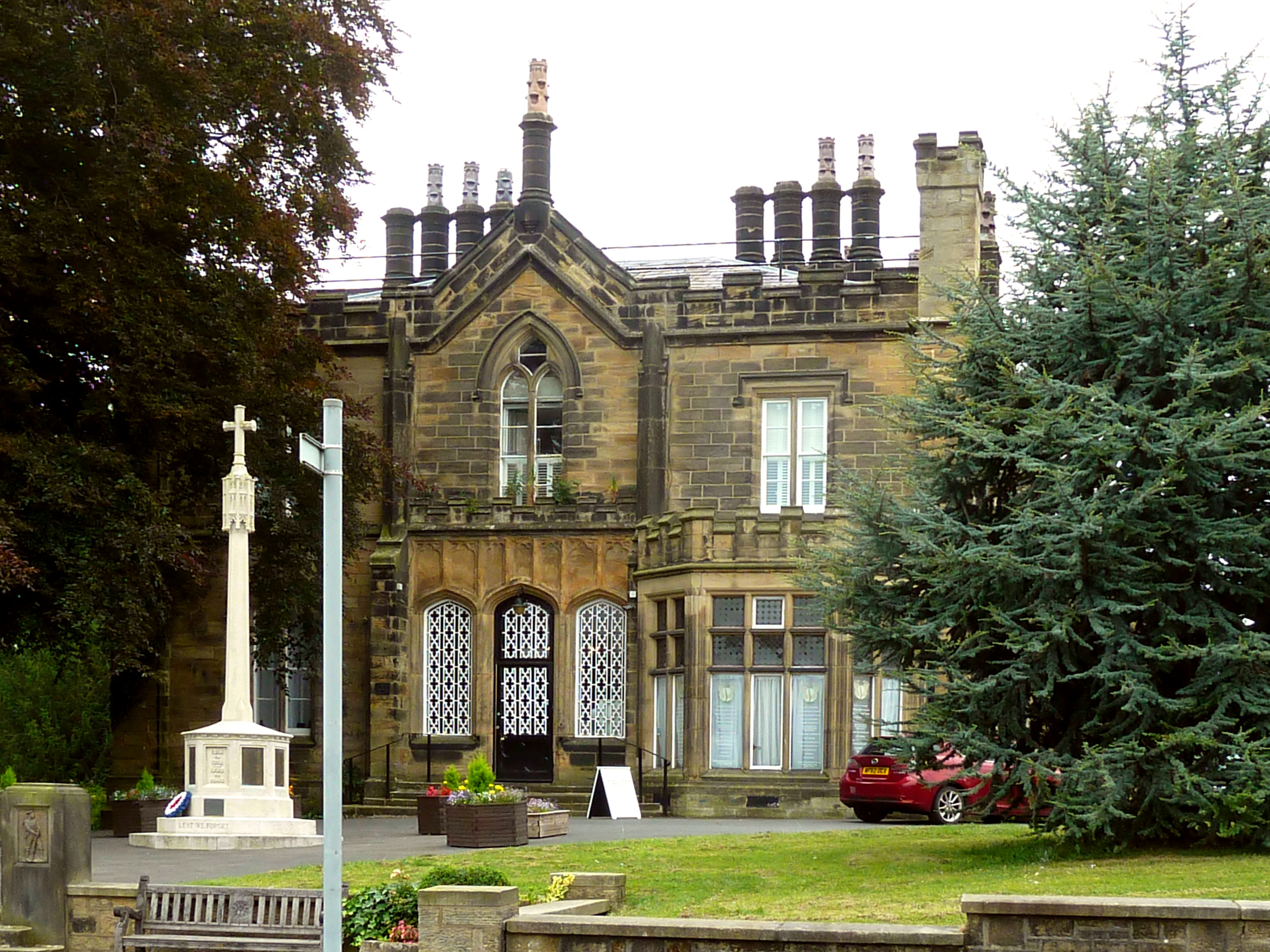
Burley Grange, north side, 2020

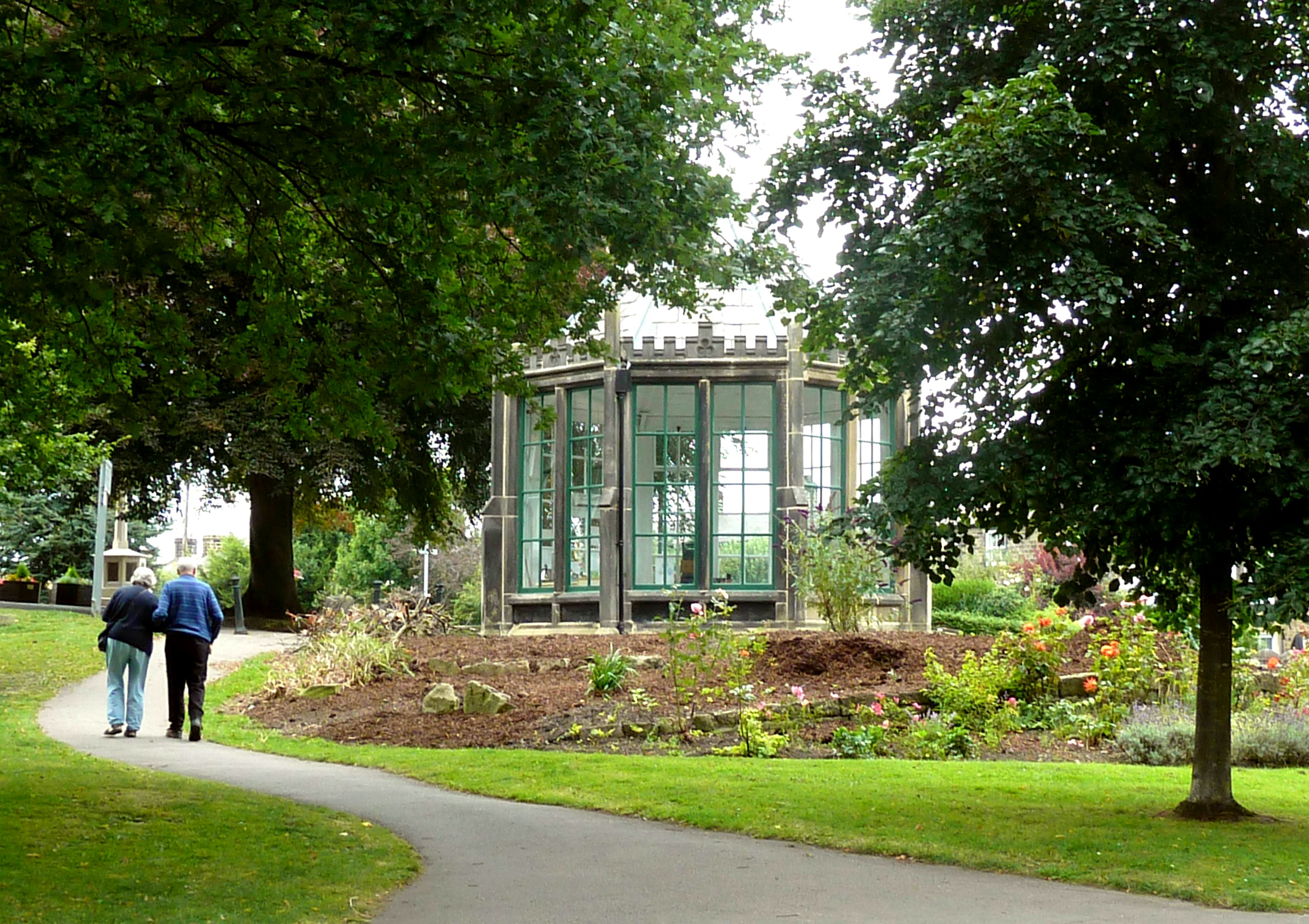
The Roundhouse in Grange Park, 2020

=== Salem Chapel, manse and Sunday schoolroom, Burley in Wharfedale, 1839–1840 ===
This Dissenter chapel, manse and schoolroom, designed for £1,500 by James Pigott Pritchett of York, was commissioned by Clapham on part of the plot on Main Street, Burley in Wharfedale, where he was building Burley Grange. The schoolroom was a revival of his previous Sunday school which had closed in 1837. He laid the foundation stone of the chapel on 14 October 1849. Mary Ann, his wife, laid the cornerstone for the schoolroom on the same day. The chapel, consecrated on 29 July 1840, was intended for “the special use of the congregation of Protestant Dissenters of the International Order.” The building, in the "Pointed style of the 12th century," originally had a balcony and a vestry inside. Between the chapel and the school was a graveyard, which was last used in 1896. In 1920, a 1911 German-made organ was installed in the chapel, replacing a harmonium. By 1987 the German organ had fallen into disrepair and was replaced in 1990 with an Wyvern organ. An accessible entrance was attached to the rear or south end of the church in 2005. Between at least 1858 and 1969 it was a Congregationalist church. The building is now in use as a United Reformed church.

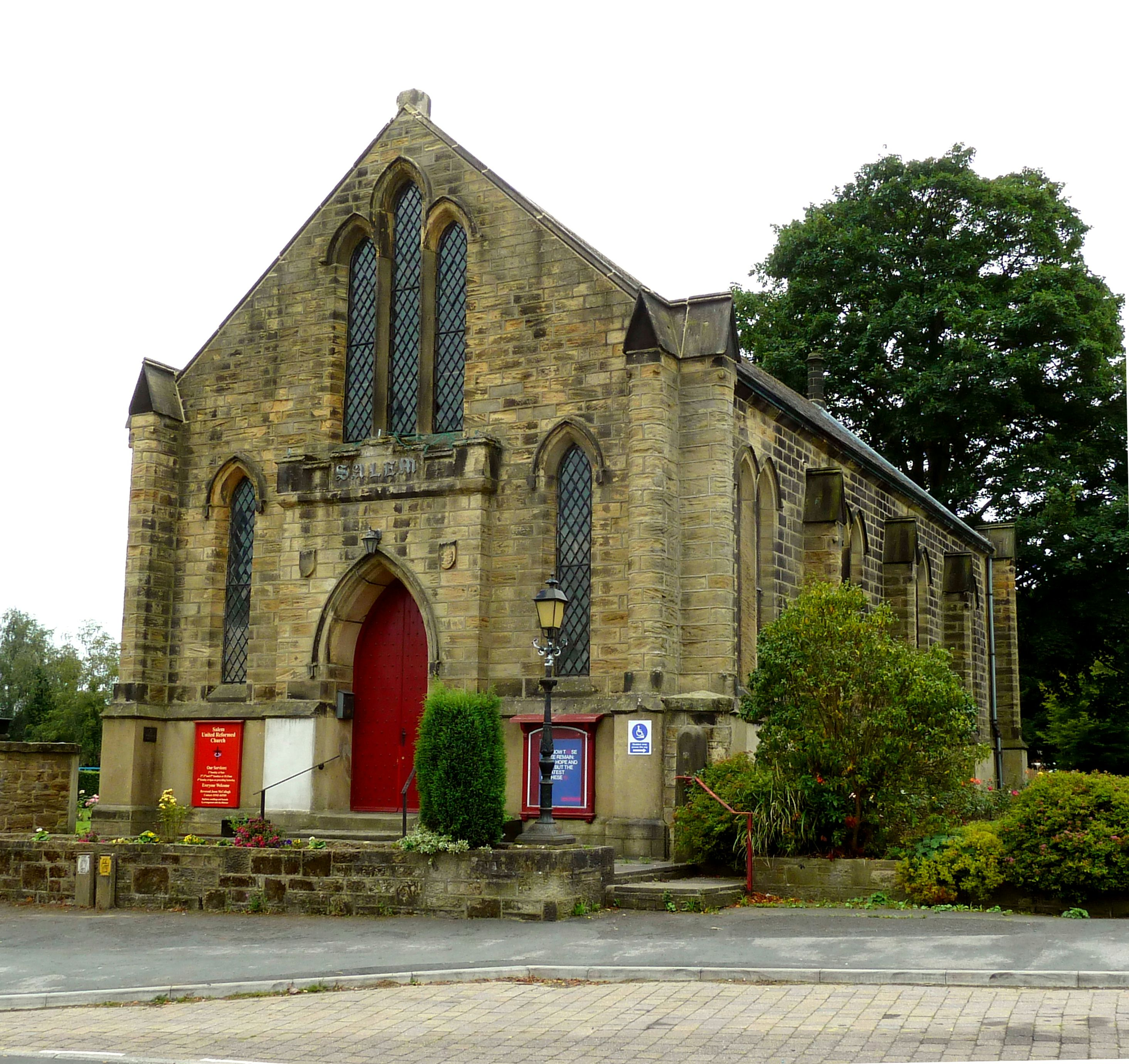
Salem Chapel, 2020

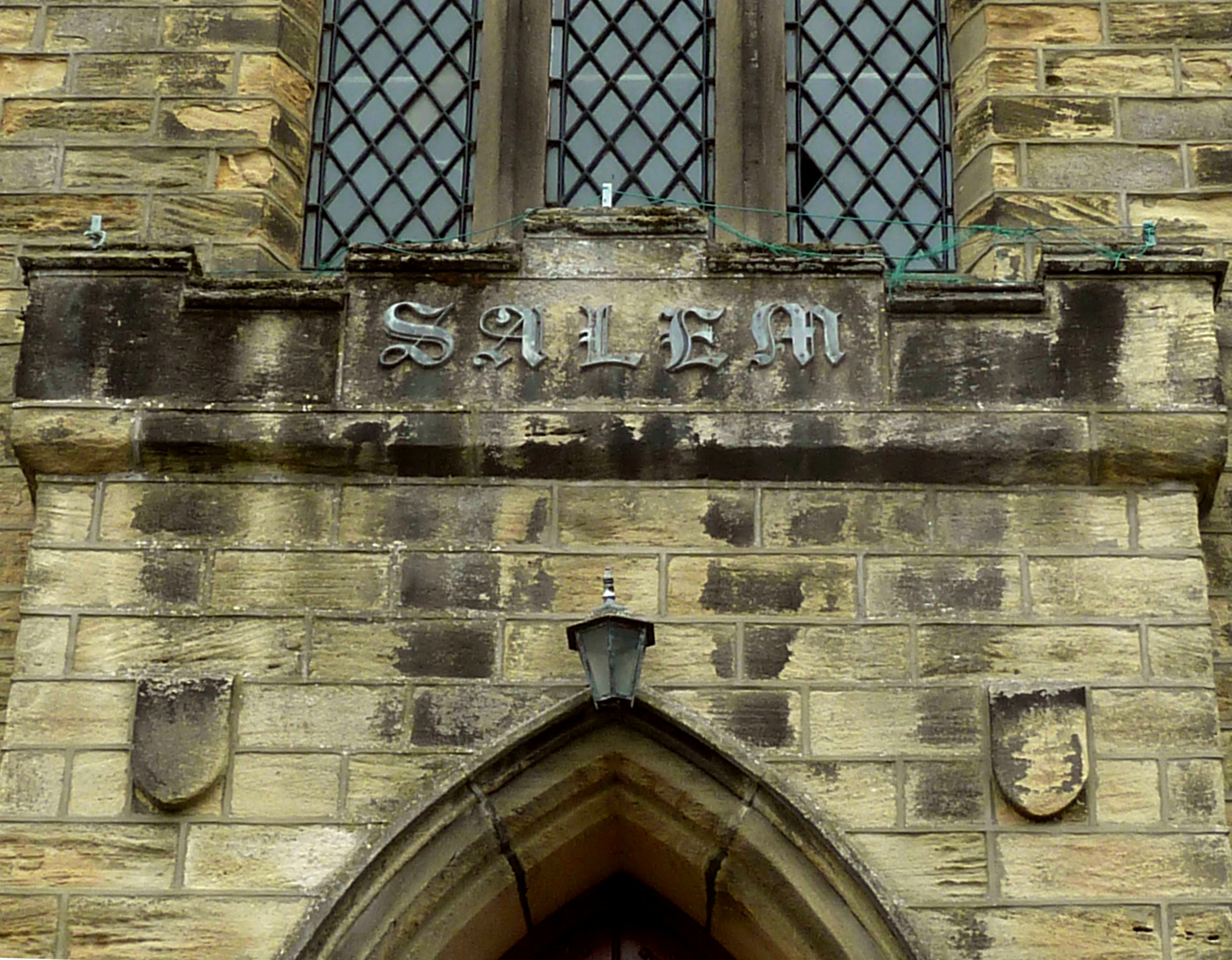
"Salem"

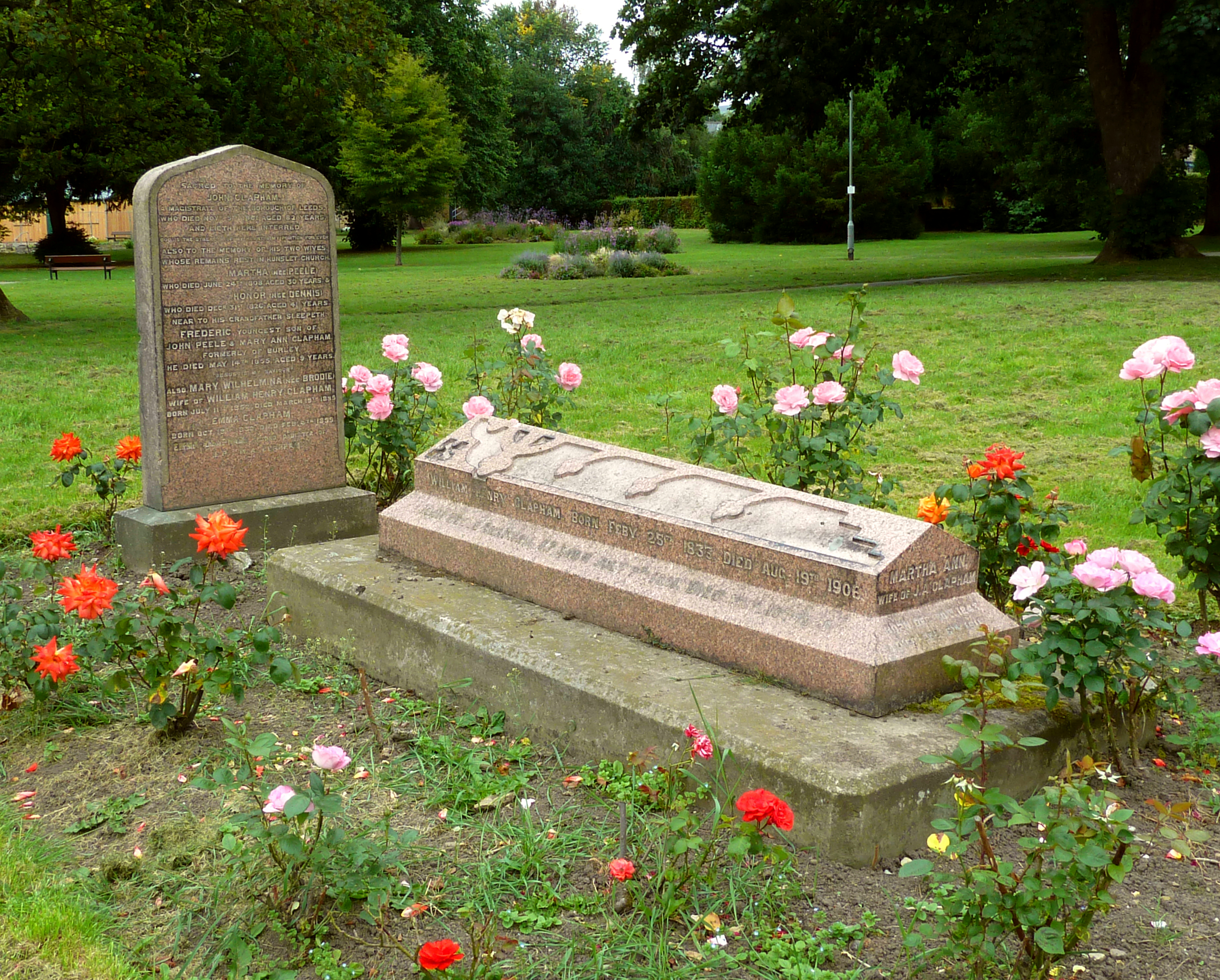
Family grave, where Clapham is buried

=== West Park Congregational Church, Harrogate, 1862 ===
Clapham chaired the 1861–1862 building committee of West Park Congregational Church (Now West Park URC), Harrogate.

=== Ilkley Hospital, Ilkley, 1862 ===
This building in Ilkley, West Riding of Yorkshire, had its origins in Ilkley Bath Charity, then in 1862 became Ilkley Hospital designed by Perkin and Backhouse, as part of the Hydro movement which involved health-giving spa baths. Clapham was one of the founders of this charity and building; he was a subscriber to the charity from 1842. As of 2020 the building was in use as Abbeyfield Grove House Care Home.

=== Nonconformist chapel at Grove Road Cemetery, Harrogate, 1863 ===
The 4.5-acre site for Grove Road Cemetery, Harrogate, was purchased in 1862. It once had two chapels with spires, designed by Thomas Charles Sorby (1836–1924) of London, at a cost of £5,000. Clapham laid the foundation stone for the non-denominational chapel on 23 May 1863. One of the ministers who spoke at the ceremony was Rev. John Henry Gavin, the first minister of West Park Congregational Church, Harrogate. Gavin was to be buried there himself at age 38 in 1868. Having processed from the National School to the cemetery with interested parties including eleven clergymen and various Burial Board members, the Bishop of Ripon consecrated the episcopalian half of the cemetery and the Anglican chapel on 23 April 1864. Although the chapels formed an "attractive feature in the landscape," they were both demolished in 1958 to create more burial space.

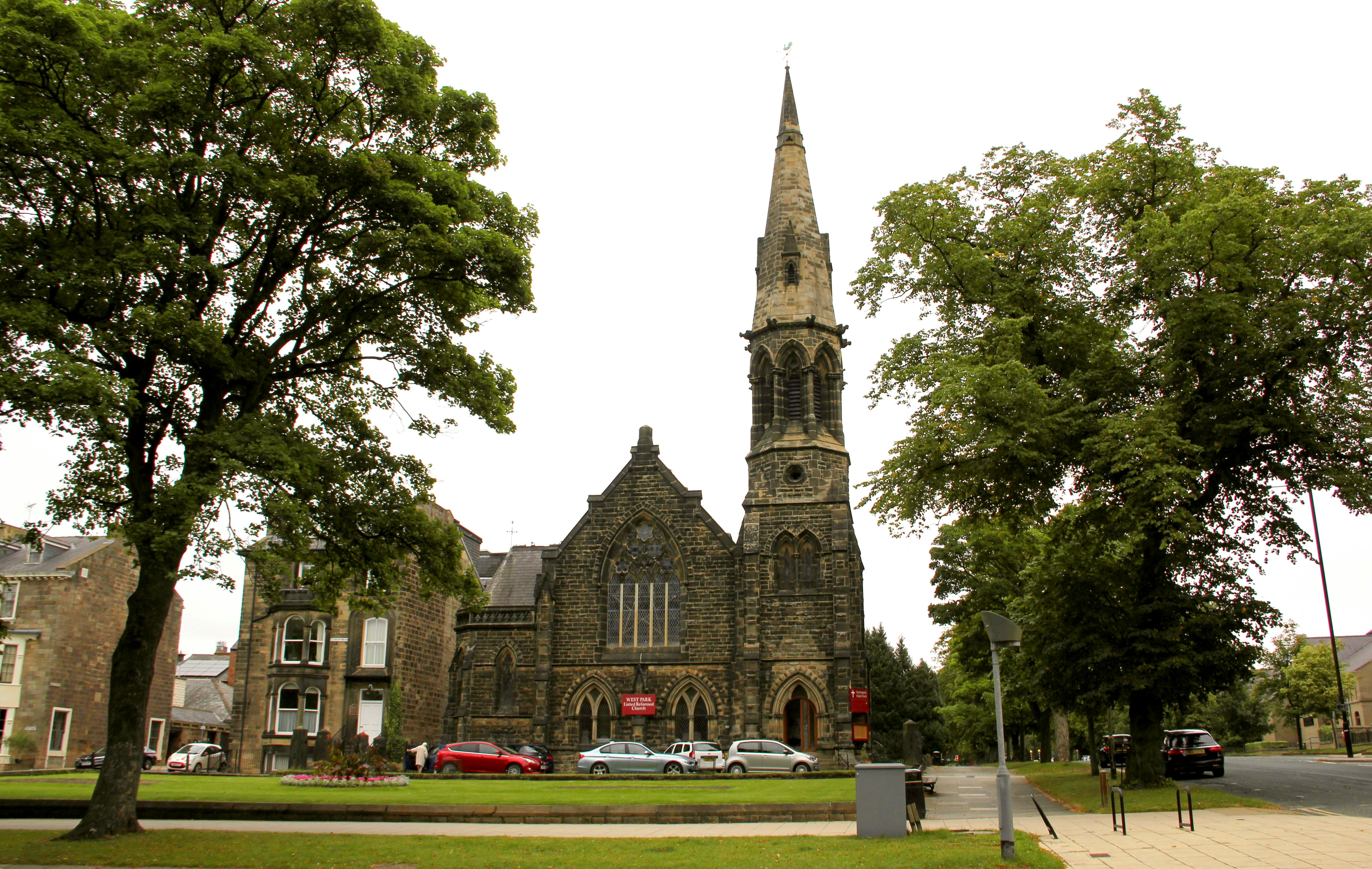
West Park Congregational church (now URC), built 1862

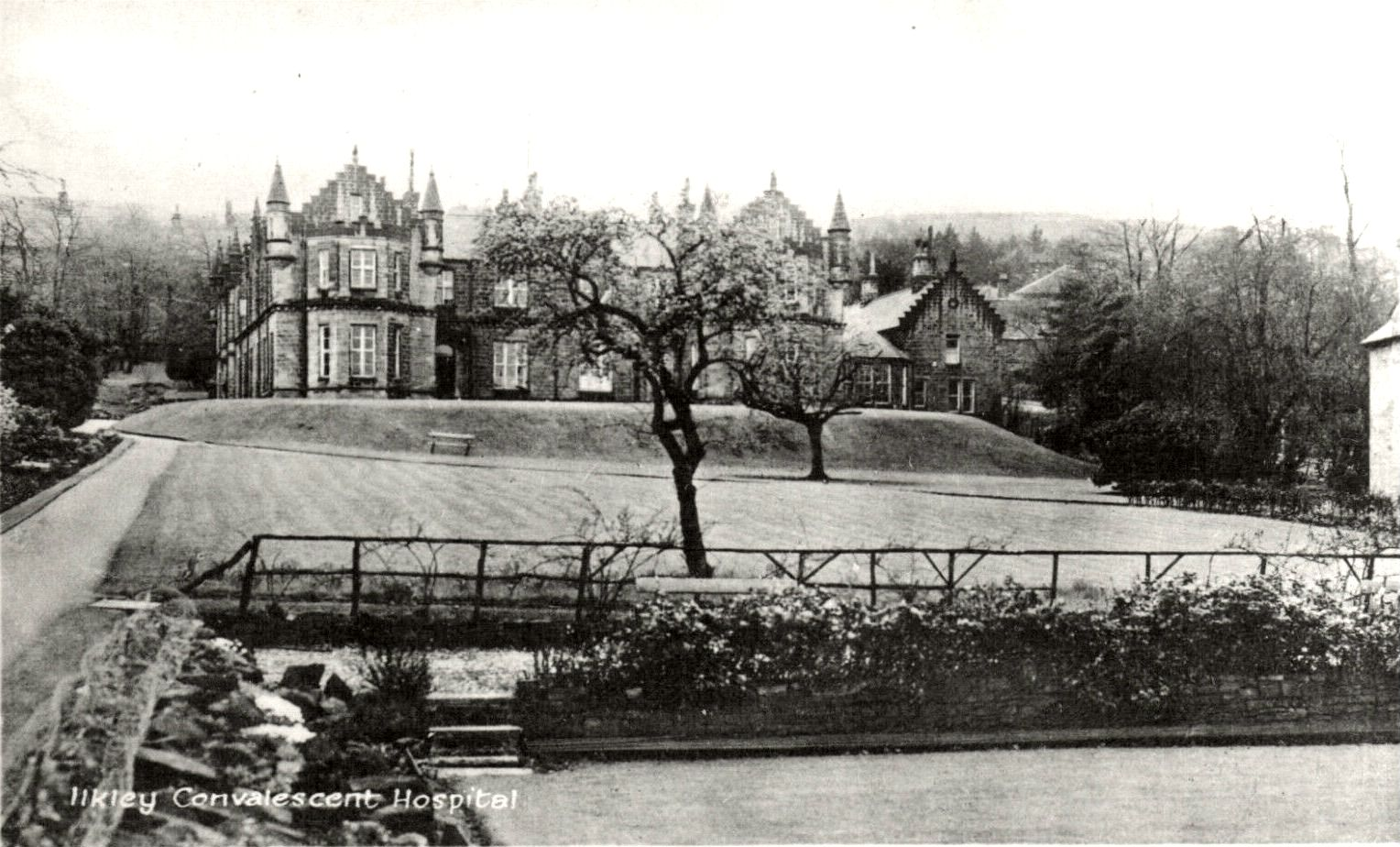
Ilkley Hospital, built 1862

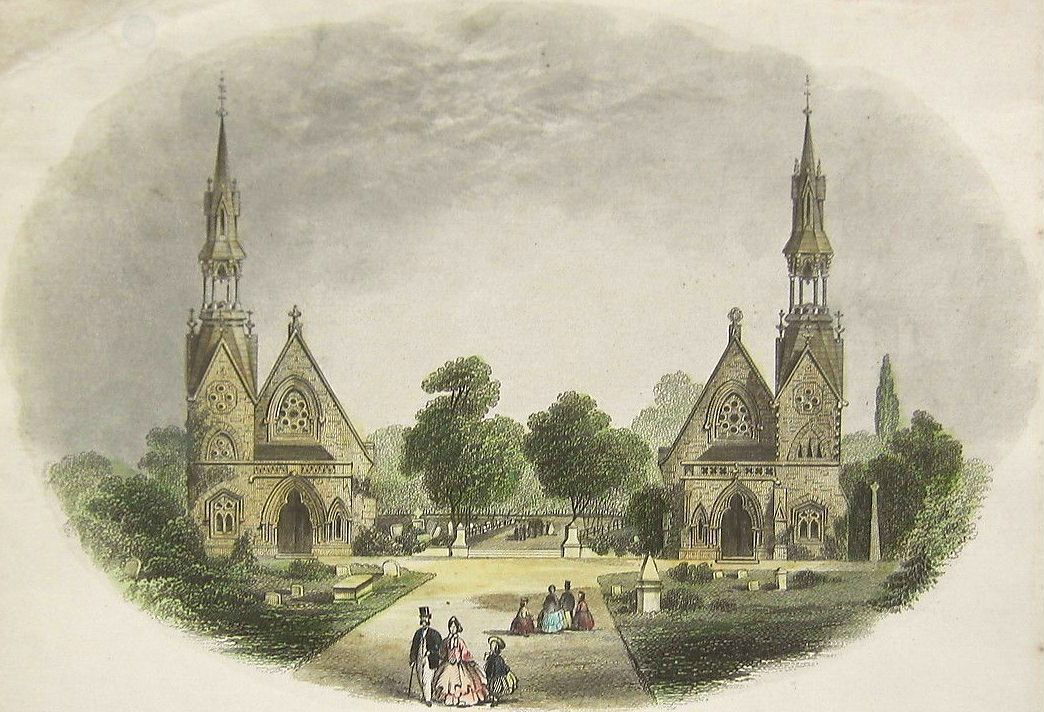
Harrogate cemetery chapels, 1863
