= Scalebor Park Hospital =

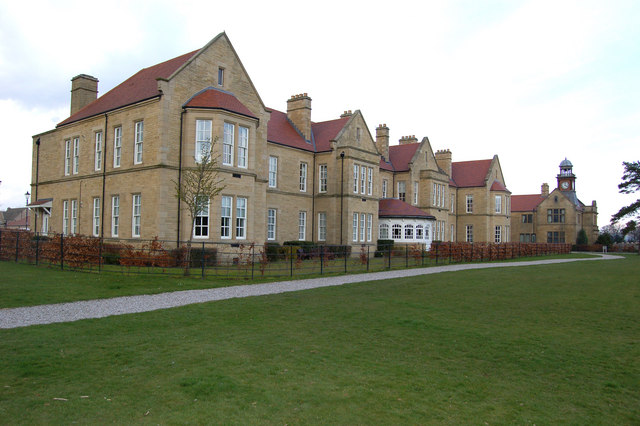
- Scalebor Park Hospital

- Shown in West Yorkshire

Geography
- Location: Burley in Wharfedale, England
- Coordinates: 53.9080°N 1.7593°W

Organisation
- Care system: NHS
- Type: Specialist

Services
- Speciality: Mental health

History
- Founded: 1902
- Closed: 1995

Links
- Lists: Hospitals in England

Scalebor Park Hospital was a mental health facility at Burley in Wharfedale in West Yorkshire, England.

== History ==
The hospital, which was designed by J. Vickers Edwards using a compact arrow layout, opened as the West Riding Private Asylum in 1902. It became Scalebor Park Mental Hospital in the 1920s. Although initially established as a private asylum for fee-paying patients, the facility was owned by the West Riding County Council. Being unable to compete with the state, it joined the National Health Service as Scalebor Park Hospital in 1948.

After the introduction of Care in the Community in the early 1980s, the hospital went into a period of decline and closed in 1995. Parts of the hospital site were demolished, and the main administration block was converted into apartments in 2001.
