= Burley Woodhead =

Hamlet in West Yorkshire, England

Coordinates: 53.893°N 1.766°W

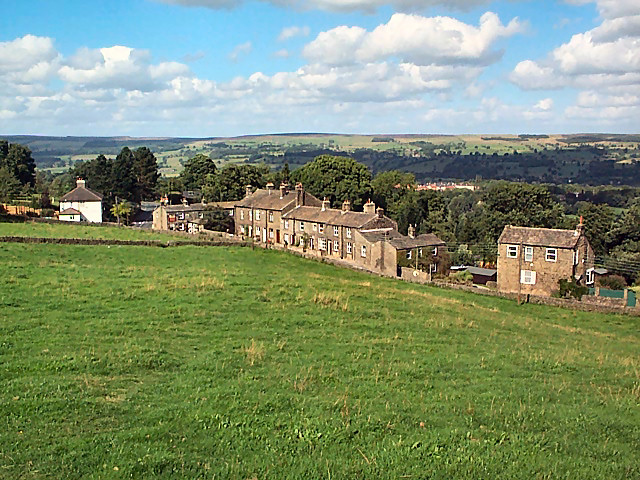
- Central part of the settlement

- Location within West Yorkshire
- OS grid reference: SE155445
  - London: 175 mi (282 km) SSE
- Civil parish: Burley
- Metropolitan borough: City of Bradford
- Metropolitan county: West Yorkshire
- Region: Yorkshire and the Humber
- Country: England
- Sovereign state: United Kingdom
- Post town: ILKLEY
- Postcode district: LS29
- Dialling code: 01943
- Police: West Yorkshire
- Fire: West Yorkshire
- Ambulance: Yorkshire
- UK Parliament: Shipley

Burley Woodhead is a hamlet in the City of Bradford, in West Yorkshire, England. The hamlet is 1 mile (1.6 km) to the south-west of Burley in Wharfedale and is approximately 3 miles (5 km) from the spa town of Ilkley. Burley Woodhead comprises chiefly of a small cluster of farms and homes along the road from Ilkley to Guiseley at the foot of Burley Moor, though the village is at 560 feet (170 m) above sea level, with the moor being some 1,300 feet (400 m) above sea level. The local public house is The Hermit.

Between 1832 and 1976, the hamlet had its own school. The building itself is a grade II listed structure and is now in private hands. The primary schooling is in the nearby village of Burley in Wharfedale at the Burley and Woodhead Primary School. The former Wesleyan Chapel, which dates from 1867, is now a private residence.

The moors to the west have attracted meteorologists and tourists to a weather phenomenon known as the brocken spectre. This occurs when it is foggy and the observer is above the fog with the sun behind them, which creates a shadowy figure. The phenomenon is normally associated with mountains, but occurs on Burley Moor because of the local geography and weather conditions. These same conditions produce fog at Leeds Bradford Airport south 2.5 miles (4 km) to the south-east.

To the west of the village is the former quarry workings of Burley Woodhead Moor; the face of the quarry is now used by climbers. The hamlet is also crossed by the Ebor Way and the Dales Way walks.

Carr Beck runs through the southern half of the hamlet and is a tributary of the River Wharfe. The beck is dammed to the west of the village and forms Carr Bottom Reservoir, which is not used as a drinking supply, but as a compensation reservoir. White clawed crayfish have been found in the beck. The reservoir is part of the South Pennines SSSI area.

== See also ==
- Listed buildings in Burley in Wharfedale
