= Burnsall Bridge =

Bridge in North Yorkshire, England

Coordinates: 54°02′47″N 1°57′05″W

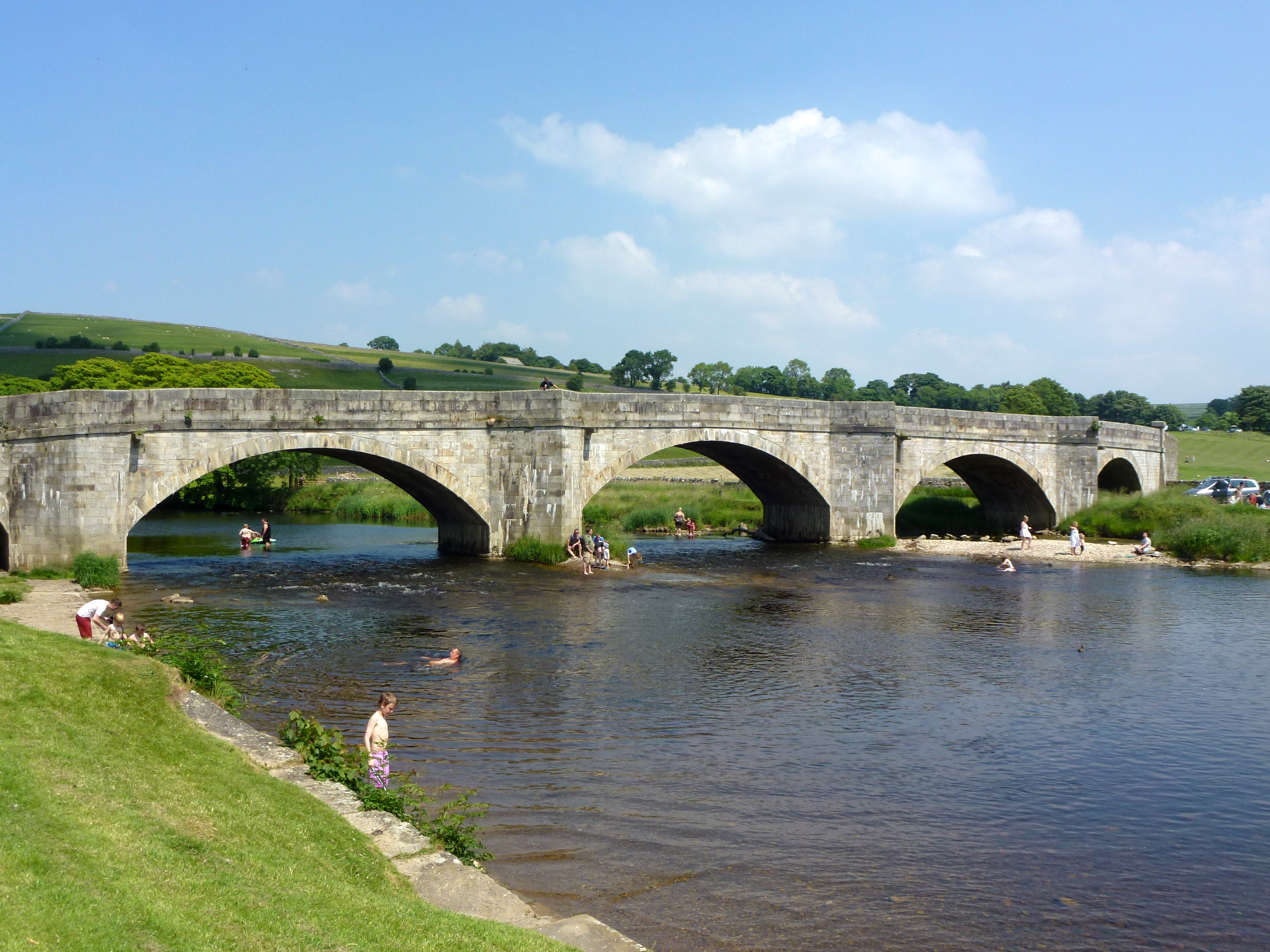
The bridge, in 2013.

Burnsall Bridge is a historic bridge across the River Wharfe in North Yorkshire, in England. The bridge connects the civil parishes of Burnsall and Hartlington.

A bridge across the river at Burnsall was in existence early by the 14th century. It was repaired in 1609 at the expense of William Craven, and again repaired in 1659, at a cost of £300. It was brought down during a flood in the summer of 1673, which destroyed many other bridges on the river. The bridge was reconstructed, with funding from a charge levied across the West Riding of Yorkshire. The bridge was again severely damaged in a flood in 1883, with a reconstructed bridge opening in 1885. It has been Grade II listed since 1954. It is a much-photographed location, on a picturesque section of the river, and is crossed by the Dales Way.

The narrow stone bridge is slightly hump-backed. It carries the B6160 road over the River Wharfe, and consists of five segmental arches, the outer arches smaller. It has triangular cutwaters rising to pedestrian refuges, a band, a parapet and end pilasters.

== See also ==
- Listed buildings in Burnsall
