= St Wilfrid's Church, Burnsall =

Parish church of Burnsall in England

Coordinates: 54°02′59″N 1°57′06″W

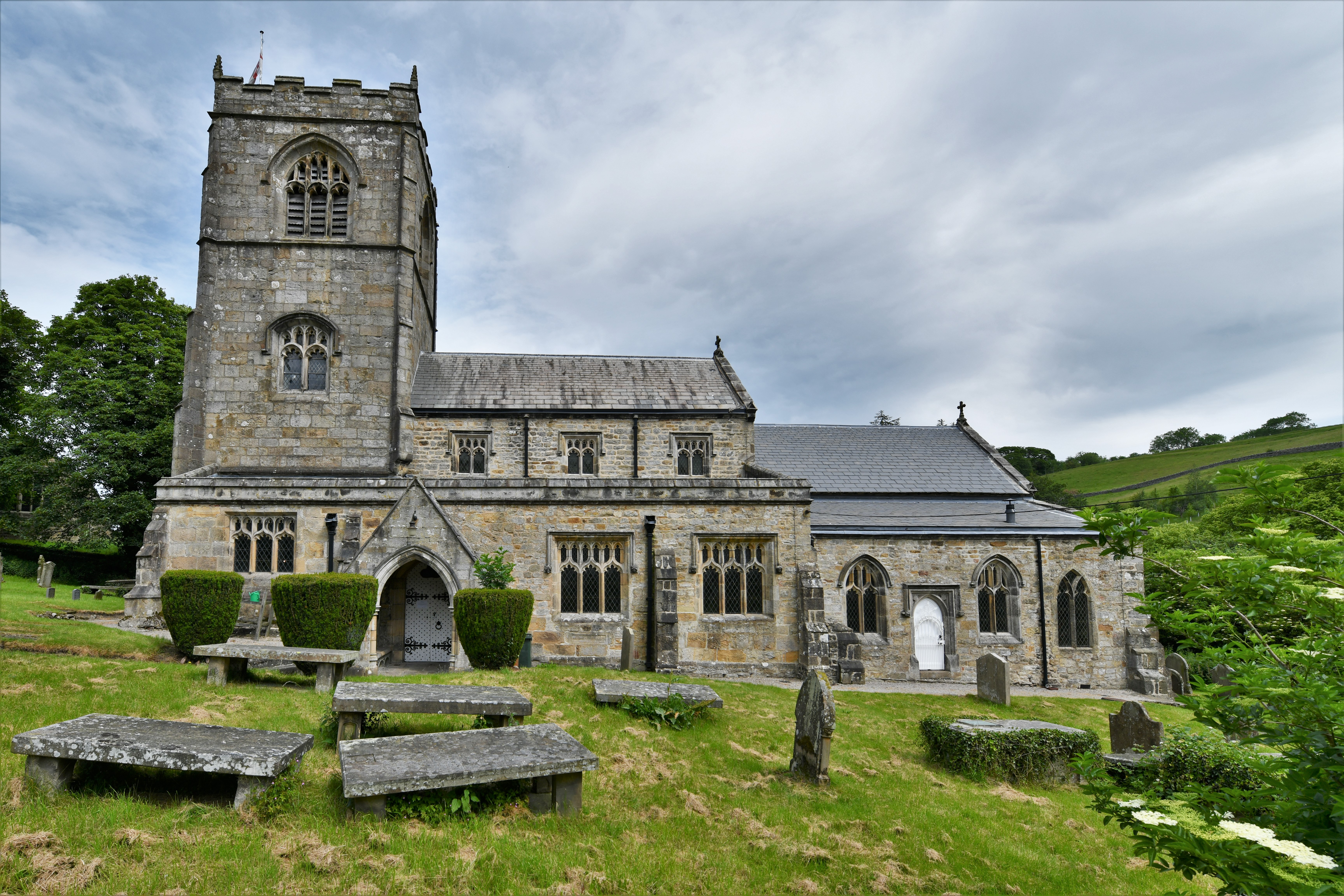
The church, in 2019

St Wilfrid's Church is the parish church of Burnsall, a village in North Yorkshire, in England.

Local legend holds that Saint Wilfrid visited Burnsall in the late 7th century, and preached from a rock by the River Wharfe. The discovery of various Anglo-Scandinavian carved stones suggests that there was a church on the site by 875, perhaps built of wood, but rebuilt in stone during the 11th century. The oldest part of the current building are the aisles, added in the second quarter of the 13th century, while the nave, chancel and tower were rebuilt in the early 16th century. The church was restored in 1612, and again in 1858. The Victorian restoration was by John Varley, who inserted a new chancel arch, and raised the nave roof by six feet. The church was Grade I listed in 1954. In 2017, the roofs were repaired, using a grant from the National Churches Trust.

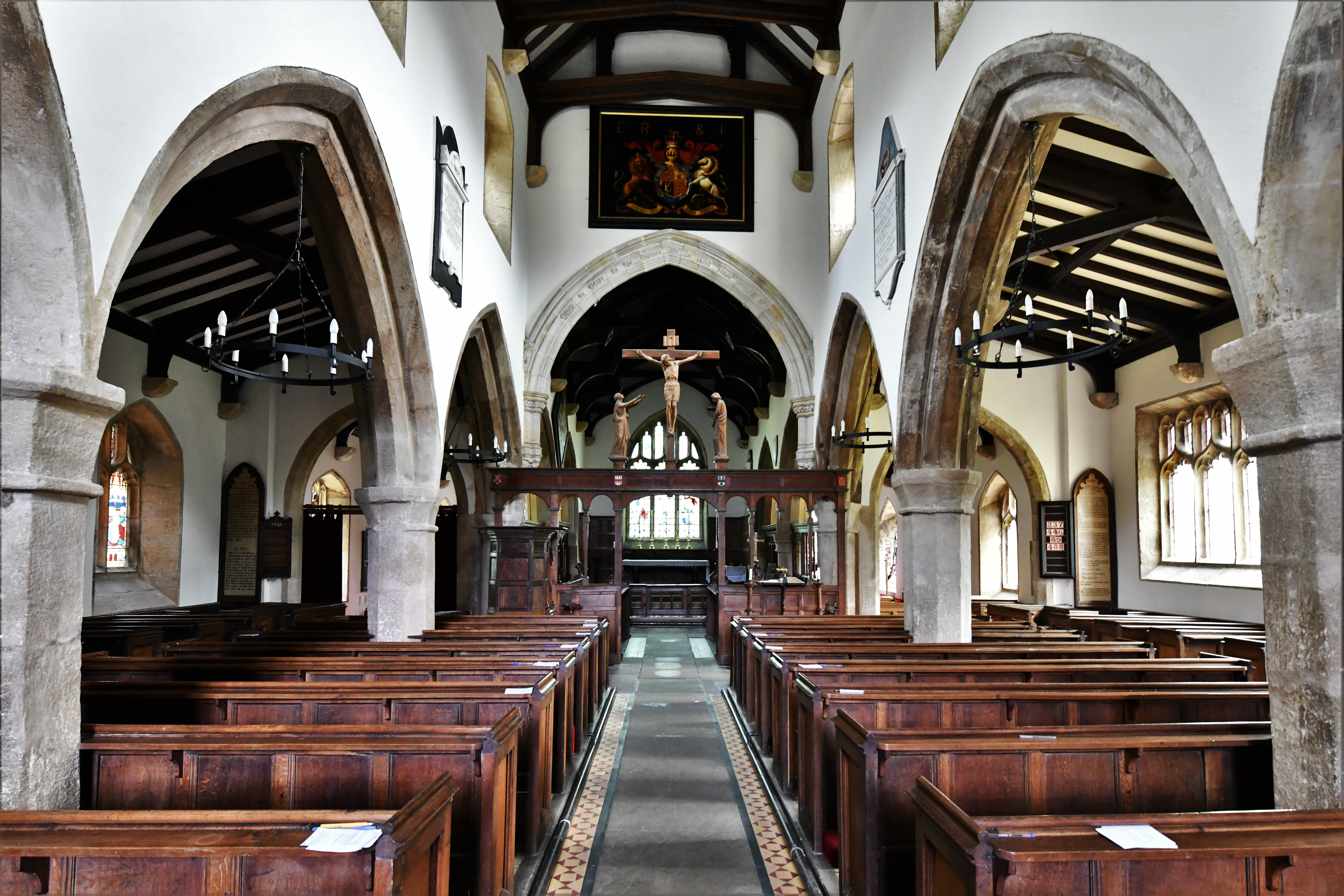
View from the nave into the chancel

The church is built of stone with a stone slate roof, and is mainly in the Perpendicular style. The church consists of a nave with a clerestory, north and south aisles, a south porch, a chancel with a vestry and a south chantry, and a west tower embraced by the aisles. The tower has three stages, diagonal buttresses, a three-light west window and a doorway with a four-centred arch. Above is a clock face with an octagonal surround, a two-light window, chamfered and moulded bands, three-light bell openings with hood moulds, and an embattled parapet with corner pinnacles.

Inside the church, there is a circular Norman font on a square base, and a Jacobean pulpit. In the vestry, there is a 14th-century alabaster panel, depicting the Nativity. Various fragments of pre-Norman Conquest crosses and hogbacks have been collected from the local area and are on display in the building.

== See also ==
- Grade I listed buildings in North Yorkshire (district)
- Listed buildings in Burnsall
