= Listed buildings in Hartlington =

Hartlington is a civil parish in the county of North Yorkshire, England. It contains seven listed buildings that are recorded in the National Heritage List for England. All the listed buildings are designated at Grade II, the lowest of the three grades, which is applied to "buildings of national importance and special interest". The parish contains the village of Hartlington and the surrounding countryside. The listed buildings consist of farmhouses and farm buildings, a watermill converted into flats, and a milepost.

== Buildings ==
Name and location	Photograph	Date	Notes
Summersgill and barn 54.04606°N 1.94478°W		16th century	The farmhouse and attached barn are in stone with a stone slate roof, and two storeys. The farmhouse has two bays, and contains a doorway with a chamfered surround, and chamfered mullioned windows. The barn to the left has a central wagon door with a chamfered segmental arch. Inside the farmhouse is an inglenook fireplace.
Kings Farmhouse and barn 54.06170°N 1.93564°W		17th century	The farmhouse and attached barn are in stone with a stone slate roof, and two storeys. The farmhouse has a doorway in a chamfered surround, and the windows are casements, some with chamfered surrounds, one with mullions, and some have fixed lights. The barn to the right projects, and contains a central doorway with a quoined surround, and a segmental-arched lintel with a keystone, and to its left is a doorway with a chamfered surround.
Fell View; 54.05299°N 1.94227°W	—	Early 18th century	A farmhouse in whitewashed stone, with a stone slate roof, stone coping and shaped kneelers. There are two storeys and two bays. The central doorway has a slate triangular pediment, and the windows are mullioned.
Holes Beck Farmhouse and barn 54.06249°N 1.93837°W		18th century	The farmhouse and attached barn are in stone with a stone slate roof, and two storeys. The farmhouse has quoins, modillions, and a stone coped gable on the left. There are two bays. The farmhouse contains a doorway with a tall casement window to the right, and the other windows are mullioned. The barn to the right has a central doorway in a surround with a segmental arch, and another doorway.
Hartlington Mill; 54.04457°N 1.93794°W	—	Mid to late 18th century	A watermill converted into flats, it is in stone and has a stone slate roof. It is built into a hillside, with three storeys at the right end and two at the left end. The windows are casements, and in the right return is a large cast iron undershot waterwheel.
Milepost; 54.06399°N 1.93649°W		Early 19th century	The milepost by a road junction consists of a crudely cut triangular-sectioned stone. It is inscribed with a pointing hand and the distances to Burnsall and Skipton.
Wharfe House Farmhouse; 54.04512°N 1.94308°W		Early 19th century	The farmhouse is in stone, and has a stone slate roof with stone coping and a shaped kneeler on the left. There are two storeys and three bays. The central doorway has an architrave, a pediment and consoles, and is set in a semicircular recess. The windows are casements with plain surrounds.
