= Listed buildings in Burnsall =

Burnsall is a civil parish in the county of North Yorkshire, England. It contains 19 listed buildings that are recorded in the National Heritage List for England. Of these, one is listed at Grade I, the highest of the three grades, and the others are at Grade II, the lowest grade. The parish contains the village of Burnsall and the surrounding countryside, and the listed buildings include houses, cottages, farmhouses, a church, its lych gate, a set of stocks in the churchyard, a hotel, a school, a former chapel, a bridge and a telephone kiosk.

== Key ==
Grade	Criteria
I	Buildings of exceptional interest, sometimes considered to be internationally important
II	Buildings of national importance and special interest

== Buildings ==
Name and location	Photograph	Date	Notes	Grade
St Wilfrid's Church; 54.04961°N 1.95175°W		13th century	The church has been altered and extended through the centuries, including a restoration in 1858–59. It is built in stone with a stone slate roof, and is mainly in Perpendicular style. The church consists of a nave with a clerestory, north and south aisles, a south porch, a chancel with a vestry and a south chantry, and a west tower embraced by the aisles. The tower has three stages, diagonal buttresses, a three-light west window and a doorway with a four-centred arch. Above is a clock face with an octagonal surround, a two-light window, chamfered and moulded bands, three-light bell openings with hood moulds, and an embattled parapet with corner pinnacles.	I
The Old Grammar School; 54.04929°N 1.95152°W		1601	The school is in stone on a plinth, and has a stone slate roof with chamfered stone coping, ball finials, and a bellcote on the right gable. There are two storeys and six bays. In the third bay is a full height gabled porch containing a doorway with a moulded surround and a four-centred arch under a square head with foliated spandrels. Above it is an inscribed and dated panel flanked by engaged columns carrying a cornice, and over it is a hood mould. The inner doorway has a chamfered surround and a four-centred arch. All the windows have ogee mullions and leaded lights, those in the ground floor under a continuous hood mould.	II
Calgarth House; 54.04256°N 1.94621°W		17th century	A farmhouse, now in ruins, in stone with quoins and a stone slate roof. There are two storeys and two bays. In the centre is a doorway with a plain surround. The windows have three lights and mullions, the mullions at the front are flat-faced, and at the rear they are double-chamfered.	II
Lych gate 54.04932°N 1.95227°W		17th century	The lych gate, which was moved to its present position in 1882 at the entrance to the churchyard of St Wilfrid's Church, is in stone with a stone slate roof. It contains a wooden gate with vertical bars, and a central spindle with an attached weight in the flanking walls.	II
Riverside; 54.04705°N 1.95208°W	—	17th century	The house is in stone with a stone slate roof, two storeys and three bays. The doorway is in the right return, and the windows have double-chamfered surrounds; in the ground floor they are mullioned with four lights, in the upper floor they are horizontally-sliding sashes, and there is a blind round opening on the right.	II
Rose Cottage; 54.04764°N 1.95229°W	—	17th century	The house is in stone with modillions and a stone slate roof. There are two storeys and two bays. The central doorway has a plain surround and a cornice. The ground floor windows are mullioned, with three lights on the front and two on the left return, and in the upper floor are casement windows. Inside, there is a large inglenook fireplace.	II
Skuff View; 54.04995°N 1.95362°W		17th century	The house is in stone with quoins and a stone slate roof. There are two storeys and four bays. The doorway has a moulded chamfered surround, a Tudor arch and a flat head. Most of the windows are mullioned, with some mullions missing, and in the right return are casement windows.	II
Stocks; 54.04964°N 1.95234°W		17th century	The stocks are in the churchyard of St Wilfrid's Church. They consist of two stone piers, between which are two boards with four holes for legs, and locking ironwork.	II
Wharfe Gate; 54.05008°N 1.95125°W	—	17th century	A stone house with quoins, double modillions and a stone slate roof. There are two storeys and three bays. The doorway has a plain surround and a moulded pediment. The windows are a mix of casements and mullioned windows, some with hood moulds.	II
Colton House and The Grange; 54.04965°N 1.95290°W	—	1723	A house divided into two, in stone, with a floor band, and a stone slate roof with moulded stone copings and shaped kneelers. There are two storeys, a double-pile plan, and seven bays. In the centre is a full height gabled porch containing a doorway with a moulded architrave, a convex frieze and a cornice, above which is an initialled and dated panel, and to the right is a doorway with a moulded architrave. The windows are mullioned in moulded architraves.	II
Holly House; 54.04735°N 1.95276°W		18th century	The house is in rendered stone with quoins and a stone slate roof. There are two storeys and three bays. The doorway has a plain surround and a rectangular fanlight. The ground floor windows are mullioned, and in the upper floor are sash windows.	II
Oat Croft Farmhouse; 54.05053°N 1.95542°W	—	18th century	The farmhouse is in stone, and has a stone slate roof with stone copings and shaped kneelers. There are two storeys and five bays. On the front is a gabled porch containing a doorway with a moulded chamfered surround and a segmental-arched head. To the left is a board door, and in the right bay is a wagon doorway with a triangular-arched lintel. Most of the windows have flat-faced mullions, and there are also casement windows.	II
Red Lion Hotel; 54.04681°N 1.95210°W		18th century	The hotel was extended in the 19h century with the addition of three bays on the left. It is in stone, and has a stone slate roof with stone copings and shaped kneelers on the left. There are two storeys and seven bays. The doorway has Doric pilasters on plinths, a fanlight, a frieze and a cornice. The ground floor of the left three bays contains three canted bay windows, and above is a casement window and two two-light mullioned windows. All the windows in the right four bays have flat-faced mullions, the window above the doorway with two lights, and the others with four.	II
Bridge House, railings and bridge marker 54.04678°N 1.95246°W		Early 19th century	The house is in stone with quoins, modillions, and a stone slate roof with stone coping on the right. There are two storeys and three bays. In the centre is a gabled porch with quoins, and a doorway with a convex frieze and a cornice, and the windows are sashes. Enclosing the garden at the front is a stone wall with railings, and to the right is an iron county bridge marker.	II
Howgill House; 54.04726°N 1.95251°W	—	Early 19th century	A stone house with chamfered quoins, modillions, and a stone slate roof. There are two storeys and three bays. On the front are two doorways, one with a slate porch roof, the windows are sashes, and all the openings have plain surrounds.	II
Ivy Cottage; 54.04719°N 1.95243°W	—	Early 19th century	The house is in stone with quoins and a stone slate roof. There are two storeys and two bays. The central doorway has a plain surround, on the left is a sash window, and the other windows are mullioned with three lights.	II
Former Methodist chapel 54.04790°N 1.95140°W		Late 19th century	The chapel, later used for other purposes, is in stone with a stone slate roof. There is a single storey and four bays, the right bay projecting and gabled. In the left bay is a projecting two-stage-tower, containing a doorway with a pointed arch in the left return, on the front are lancet windows, a chamfered band, and small clasping buttresses. Above is another band, a short octagonal section, a moulded cornice and a square spire with a weathervane. The middle two bays have a modillion cornice.	II
Burnsall Bridge; 54.04640°N 1.95149°W		1884	The bridge, which carries a road over the River Wharfe, is in stone, and consists of five segmental arches, the outer arches smaller. It has triangular cutwaters rising to pedestrian refuges, a band, a parapet and end pilasters.	II
Telephone kiosk 54.04648°N 1.95272°W	—	1935	The K6 type telephone kiosk to the south of Clematis Cottage was designed by Giles Gilbert Scott. Constructed in cast iron with a square plan and a dome, it has three unperforated crowns in the top panels.	II
