= Listed buildings in Nesfield with Langbar =

Nesfield with Langbar is a civil parish in the county of North Yorkshire, England. It contains six listed buildings that are recorded in the National Heritage List for England. All the listed buildings are designated at Grade II, the lowest of the three grades, which is applied to "buildings of national importance and special interest". The parish contains the villages of Nesfield and Langbar and the surrounding countryside, and the listed buildings consist of houses, a barn, a set of stocks and a pump.

== Buildings ==
Name and location	Photograph	Date	Notes
High Austby Cottage; 53.94066°N 1.84868°W	—	Mid-17th century	The house is in gritstone and has a stone slate roof. There are two storeys and six bays. On the front is a projecting porch and two semicircular stair bays. Most of the windows are mullioned and there is one narrow light.
Nesfield Manor House; 53.94225°N 1.85908°W	—	1662	The house is in gritstone with quoins and a stone slate roof. There are two storeys, four bays, and a rear outshut. On the front is a two-storey canted bay window. The doorway has a chamfered quoined surround, and a dated and initialled lintel. There are single-light windows, and the others are recessed and mullioned, with hood moulds over the ground floor windows.
Hardistys; 53.95679°N 1.85275°W		1702	The house is in whitewashed gritstone, with a stone slate roof, shaped kneelers and gable copings. There re two storeys and three bays. The doorway has an architrave and a dated and initialled plaque. The windows are a mix, and include oval windows, mullioned windows and sashes.
Stocks; 53.94200°N 1.85889°W		18th century (or earlier)	The stocks are to the south of the Manor House, and have gritstone uprights, wooden boards and a stone seat. The uprights are about 1.2 metres (3 ft 11 in) tall, and have a groove on the inner face.
Barn opposite Owl Cottage; 53.94333°N 1.86054°W	—	Mid to late 18th century (probable)	The barn is in gritstone with a stone slate roof. There are three bays, and an outshut along the south side. On the north side is a threshing door with chamfered quoined jambs, and a re-set dated and initialled lintel. Elsewhere, there are doorways and pitching doors, and in the right return is an owl hole, a ledge and a row of pigeon holes, and vent holes.
Pump; 53.94211°N 1.85920°W	—	1843	The pump is in the grounds of the Manor House, to the south of the house. It is in cast iron with a wooden casing, and about 1.5 metres (4 ft 11 in) tall. Below the outlet is a dated plaque.
