= Hetton, North Yorkshire =

Village in North Yorkshire, England

Coordinates: 54.025°N 2.060°W

Hetton
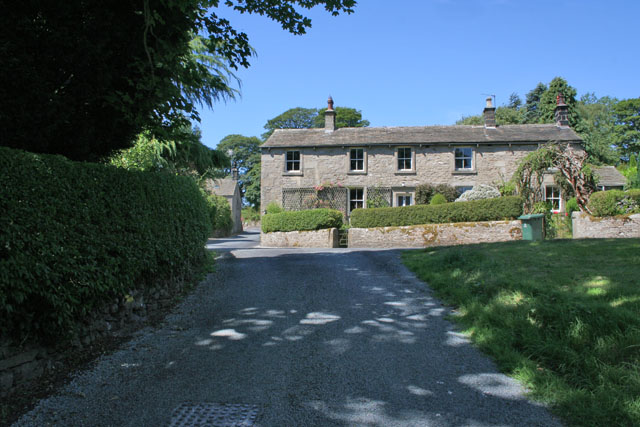
- Hetton

- Location within North Yorkshire
- Population: 155 (2011 census)
- OS grid reference: SD962584
- Civil parish: Hetton-cum-Bordley
- Unitary authority: North Yorkshire
- Ceremonial county: North Yorkshire
- Region: Yorkshire and the Humber
- Country: England
- Sovereign state: United Kingdom
- Post town: Skipton
- Postcode district: BD23
- Police: North Yorkshire
- Fire: North Yorkshire
- Ambulance: Yorkshire

Hetton is a small Dales village in the civil parish of Hetton-cum-Bordley, in the county of North Yorkshire, England. It is situated 5.75 miles (9.25 km) north of Skipton by the B6265 road. It is the largest settlement in the parish of Hetton-cum-Bordley. The population of the former civil parish of Hetton taken at the 2011 Census was 155.

== History ==
Nearby places include Cracoe, Flasby, Rylstone, Threapland and Winterburn. Hetton was mentioned in the Domesday Book as belonging to Stuartcol (or Swartkoll) in 1066, but given to Roger de Poitou by 1086. The name means the farm on the heathland (from Old English hæth tun).

Hetton was historically part of the wapentake of Staincliffe East, and within the Skipton Rural District. For administrative purpose, it formed a township with Bordley in the ancient parish of Burnsall in the West Riding of Yorkshire. In the late 19th century it became a separate township, and it became a separate civil parish in 1866. It was transferred to the new county of North Yorkshire in 1974. The civil parish was abolished on 1 April 2012 and amalgamated with the parish of Bordley to form the new civil parish of "Hetton-cum-Bordley". From 1974 to 2023 it was part of the Craven District. It is now administered by the unitary North Yorkshire Council. The area is represented at Westminster as part of the Skipton and Ripon Constituency.

The village has a Methodist church, opened in 1859, but which closed in 2021 as a house of worship. Hetton is also home to The Angel Inn, which has been awarded a Michelin Star, and is also the only restaurant in North Yorkshire to have been awarded five AA rosettes for its food.

The Dales High Way, a long-distance path, runs through the village.

== See also ==
- Listed buildings in Hetton-cum-Bordley
