= Bordley =

Village in North Yorkshire, England

Coordinates: 54.08041°N 2.09091°W

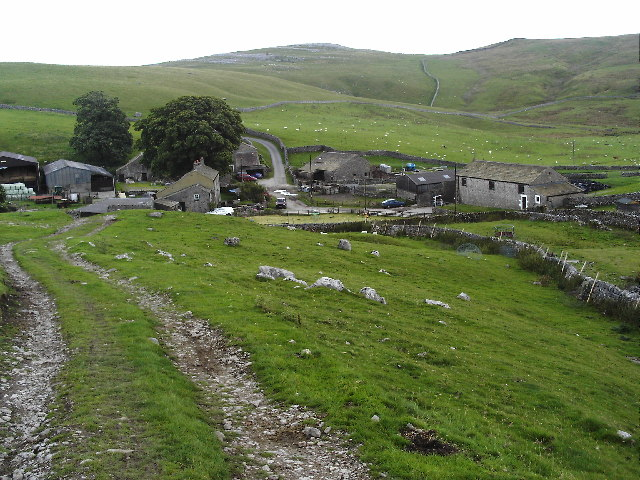
- Bordley

- Location within North Yorkshire
- Population: 23 (2001 census)
- OS grid reference: SD941649
- Civil parish: Hetton-cum-Bordley
- Unitary authority: North Yorkshire
- Ceremonial county: North Yorkshire
- Region: Yorkshire and the Humber
- Country: England
- Sovereign state: United Kingdom
- Post town: SKIPTON
- Postcode district: BD23
- Police: North Yorkshire
- Fire: North Yorkshire
- Ambulance: Yorkshire

Bordley is a village in the civil parish of Hetton-cum-Bordley, in North Yorkshire, England, within the Yorkshire Dales National Park and 12 miles (19 km) north of Skipton. According to the 2001 census the parish had a population of 23.

Bordley is mentioned as Borelaie in the Domesday Book.

Bordley was historically part of the township of Hetton with Bordley in the ancient parish of Burnsall in the West Riding of Yorkshire. In the late 19th century it became a separate township, and it became a separate civil parish in 1866. It was transferred to the new county of North Yorkshire in 1974. The civil parish was abolished on 1 April 2012 and amalgamated with the parish of Hetton to form the new civil parish of "Hetton-cum-Bordley". From 1974 to 2023 it was part of the Craven District, it is now administered by the unitary North Yorkshire Council.

== See also ==
- Listed buildings in Hetton-cum-Bordley
