= Burnsall Primary School =

State school in a historic building in Burnsall, North Yorkshire, England

Coordinates: 54°02′58″N 1°57′06″W

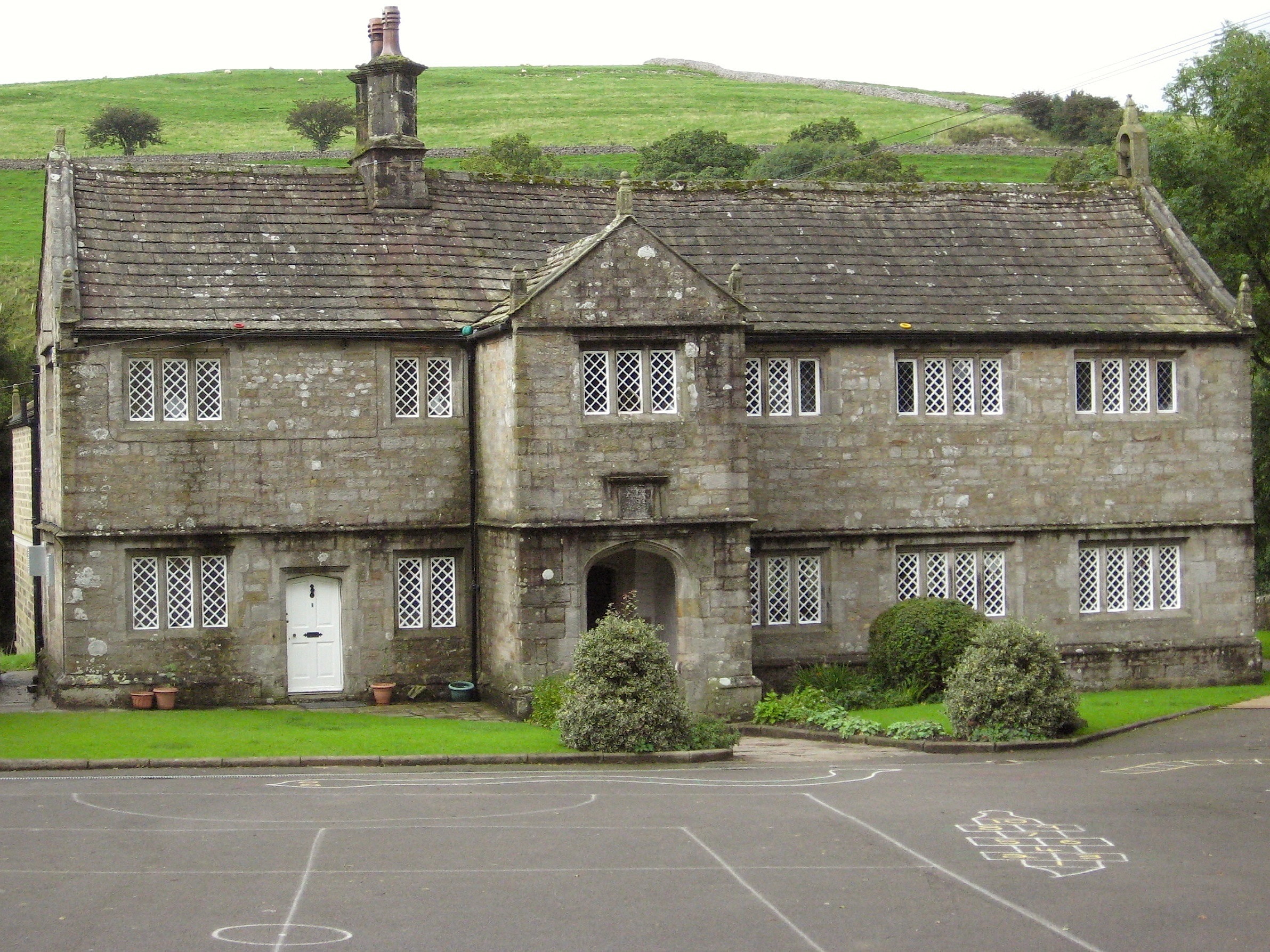
The building, in 2008

Burnsall Primary School is a state school in a historic building, in the village of Burnsall, in North Yorkshire, in England.

The building was constructed in 1601 as a grammar school for boys, with funding from William Craven. It was brought into the state system as an elementary school in 1876, admitting both boys and girls. It became a primary school in 1944. It was Grade II listed in 1969. In 2002, Alan Stockdale and John Townend wrote a history of the school, with profits going towards the construction of a new extension of the building. In 2024, the school was inspected by Ofcom and graded "good". At the time, it had 50 pupils.

The school is in stone on a plinth, and has a stone slate roof with chamfered stone coping, ball finials, and a bellcote on the right gable. There are two storeys and six bays. In the third bay is a full height gabled porch containing a doorway with a moulded surround and a four-centred arch under a square head with foliated spandrels. Above it is an inscribed and dated panel flanked by engaged columns carrying a cornice, and over it is a hood mould. The panel reads: "William Craven Alderman of London founder of this Schoole Anno Dmi 1601". The inner doorway has a chamfered surround and a four-centred arch. All the windows have ogee mullions and leaded lights, those in the ground floor under a continuous hood mould.

== See also ==
- Listed buildings in Burnsall
