= Listed buildings in Thorpe, North Yorkshire =

Thorpe is a civil parish in the county of North Yorkshire, England. It contains 21 listed buildings that are recorded in the National Heritage List for England. All the listed buildings are designated at Grade II, the lowest of the three grades, which is applied to "buildings of national importance and special interest". The parish contains the hamlet of Thorpe and the surrounding countryside. Apart from a guide stone, all the listed buildings are in the hamlet, and consist of houses, cottages and associated structures, farmhouses and farm buildings.

== Buildings ==
Name and location	Photograph	Date	Notes
Barn and byre east of Hardcastle House; 54.05253°N 1.98150°W		Early to mid-17th century	The building is in gritstone, with large quoins, and a stone slate roof. There are two storeys and two bays. The left bay contains a projecting porch and a cart entrance with corbelled wall ends, above which is a wooden lintel, slabs forming a hood mould, and a three-part stone lintel. To the right is a byre doorway, the right jamb quoined, and above are two square vents and a square doorway.
Crag Lea; 54.05053°N 1.98276°W	—	17th century	The house is in gritstone, with quoins, and a stone slate roof with moulded kneelers and gable copings. There are two storeys and two bays. The doorway has a plain surround and a moulded cornice, and there is a blocked doorway to the far right. The windows have plain surrounds. At the rear is a projecting staircase, and an outshut with a mullioned window.
Barn and bothy range south of Hardy Grange Farmhouse; 54.05256°N 1.98229°W		17th century	The range is in gritstone with quoins and a stone slate roof. There are two storeys and two bays. On the front is a low cart arch with chamfered quoined jambs and voussoirs. To the right is a byre door with a chamfered arched lintel, and between them is a window. The upper floor contains two loading doors and a window, and on the right return are external stairs leading to a doorway with a quoined surround.
Manor House Cottage and barn 54.05254°N 1.98124°W		17th century	The cottage and barn to the left are in gritstone with limestone infill, quoins and a stone slate roof. The cottage has two storeys and three bays. The doorway has a plain surround and to the right is a blocked doorway with a quoined surround and a segmental head. On the upper floor is a two-light mullioned window, and the other windows date from the 20th century. In the centre of the ban is a cart entrance with a quoined surround and a segmental arch of voussoirs, and to the left is a byre door.
Barn opposite Crag Lea; 54.05033°N 1.98243°W	—	Mid to late 17th century	The barn is in gritstone, with quoins, a stone slate roof with bulbous kneelers and gable coping, and four bays. On the north side is a byre doorway with chamfered quoined jambs and an arched lintel. The middle and left bays project as a porch under a catslide roof, and to the left are two doorways with tie-stone jambs. At the rear is a re-set doorway and a loading door, and on the right return are through stones.
Blackburn House; 54.05317°N 1.98214°W		Late 17th century	The house is in gritstone with quoins and a stone slate roof. There are two storeys and three bays. The doorway has a chamfered quoined surround, and a chamfered triangular lintel. There are recessed chamfered mullioned windows throughout, and the ground floor openings are under a continuous hood mould.
Outbuilding west of Hardcastle House; 54.05262°N 1.98179°W		Late 17th to early 18th century	The outbuilding is in stone with quoins and a stone slate roof. There are two storeys and two bays. On the right is an inserted garage door, and to the left is a doorway with chamfered quoined jambs. To its left is a square window, and above the garage door is a two-light mullioned window.
Manor House, wall and gate piers 54.05251°N 1.98088°W		Mid-18th century	The house is in limestone, with quoins, a floor band, a moulded eaves cornice, and a stone slate roof. There are two storeys and five bays. The central doorway has an architrave with Doric pilasters, an entablature with a triglyph frieze, and a moulded triangular pediment, and the windows are sashes in architraves. The garden wall is in stone with rounded coping, and the gate piers have moulded bases, a moulded band below an entablature, and a deep cornice.
Sunnyside and Sunnybank; 54.05167°N 1.98180°W		Mid to late 18th century	A house and a barn, later two houses, in gritstone with quoins and a stone slate roof. There are two storeys and four bays. They contain a doorway with a plain surround, mullioned windows, and the slightly cambered arch of the former cart entrance.
Holly Tree Farmhouse; 54.05152°N 1.98184°W		1793 (probable)	The farmhouse is in gritstone on a plinth, with rusticated quoins, a projecting eaves band, and a stone slate roof with shaped kneelers and coped gables. There are two storeys and three bays. The central doorway has attached Tuscan columns, an architrave, a fanlight, and a reeded round arch with a keystone. On the outer bays are Venetian windows with attached Tuscan columns, and sills on fluted corbels. The upper floor contains rectangular windows in reeded surrounds.
Barn south of Holly Tree Farmhouse; 54.05140°N 1.98191°W		1793	The barn is in gritstone, with quoins, and a stone slate roof with shaped kneelers and coped gables. There are two storeys and three bays. In the centre is a cart entrance with a cambered arch and quoined jambs, and on the upper storey is a loading door. On the right return are two tiers of round-arched windows with keystones. Between the upper windows is a re-set plaque with the date, initials, and a carved human head.
Manor House barn and bridge 54.05216°N 1.98112°W		Late 18th to early 19th century	A barn, coach house and stable in limestone, with quoins, and a stone slate roof with moulded kneelers and gable copings. There are two storeys and five bays. The left two bays contain windows with stone surrounds, The fourth bay has a segmental-arched carriage entrance with quoined jambs and voussoirs, and above it is a re-set datestone. The flanking bays have slit vents, and the entrance is approached by a single-arched bridge with plain parapets. At the rear are external steps. The left return has two round-arched openings, the left with voussoirs and a keystone, and the right with imposts and a keystone. Above is a square window between floor bands, and in the gable is a circular window, over which are three tiers of pigeon holes with ledges under an owl hole.
Outbuilding opposite Manor House; 54.05231°N 1.98063°W		Late 18th to early 19th century	The building is in limestone, with quoins, and a stone slate roof with shaped kneelers and gable coping. On the gable end facing the road is a round-arched doorway with imposts and a keystone. On the returns are doorways and windows of various types.
Garden wall and gate piers opposite Manor House; 54.05237°N 1.98081°W	—	Late 18th to early 19th century	The low garden wall linking the outbuilding and barn is in gritstone. At the western end it turns a corner and contains a wrought iron gate flanked by gritstone piers. Each pier is about 1 metre (3 ft 3 in) in height, and has a moulded cornice and a shallow pyramidal finial.
Culvert bridge and possible sheepwash, Manor House barn 54.05225°N 1.98122°W		Late 18th to early 19th century	The culvert mouth, lining, retaining walls and bridge are in gritstone. The culvert carries Thorpe Beck, and its mouth is round-arched with voussoirs. The bridge has a round arch, a projecting band at road level, and large blocks to the parapet. The culvert lining widens above the bridge, creating a pool.
Hardcastle House; 54.05259°N 1.98166°W		Early 19th century	The farmhouse is in gritstone, with quoins, stone gutter brackets and a stone slate roof. There are two storeys and two bays. The central doorway has a plain surround, and the windows are casements with slightly projecting stone surrounds.
Guide stone 54.05828°N 1.98717°W		Early to mid-19th century	The guide stone is in gritstone, it is about 1 metre (3 ft 3 in) in height, and has a triangular plan. On each side are pointed hands, on the left face is inscribed "TO BURNSALL", "TO LINTON" "AND / KILNSEY", and on the right face, "TO THORP" and THRESHFIELD".
Hardy Grange Farmhouse; 54.05267°N 1.98236°W		Early to mid-19th century	The farmhouse is in gritstone on a plinth, with quoins, stone gutter brackets and a stone slate roof. There are two storeys and three bays. The central doorway has a plain surround, the windows on the front are sashes with projecting surrounds, and at the rear is a central round-arched stair window.
Kail Farmhouse; 54.05123°N 1.98150°W		Early to mid-19th century	The house is in gritstone with quoins and a stone slate roof. There are two storeys, three bays and a rear wing. The middle bay on the front projects as a two-storey porch, and has an 18th-century doorway on the left return with chamfered quoined jambs and an arched lintel. Above it and on the front are windows with chamfered surrounds, the other windows dating from the 19th century.
Bull house opposite Kail Farmhouse; 54.05129°N 1.98193°W		Early to mid-19th century (probable)	The building is in gritstone with quoins and a stone slate roof. On the front is a doorway with chamfered quoined jambs and a segmental-arched lintel. To the right is a small square opening, and above it is a larger round-arched window.
Stonycroft; 54.05298°N 1.98248°W		Early to mid-19th century	The house is in gritstone, with quoins, and a stone slate roof with inturned kneelers, and projecting gable coping. The gable end faces the road and contains a central porch and sash windows.
