= Thorpe, North Yorkshire =

Hamlet and civil parish in North Yorkshire, England

Coordinates: 54°03′08″N 1°58′53″W

Thorpe
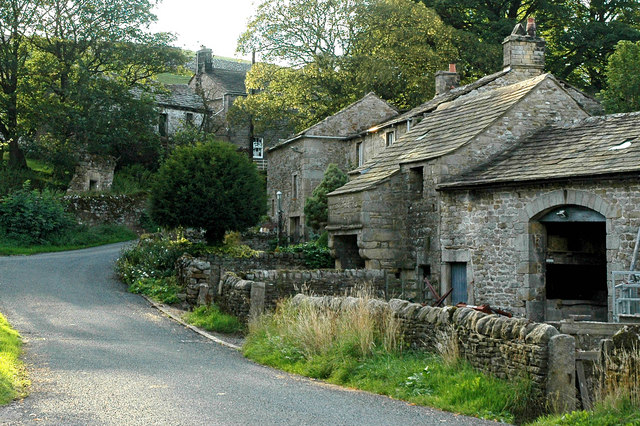
- Traditional stone-built houses and barns in Thorpe hamlet

- Location within North Yorkshire
- Population: 50 (NYCC)
- OS grid reference: SE013618
- Unitary authority: North Yorkshire
- Ceremonial county: North Yorkshire
- Region: Yorkshire and the Humber
- Country: England
- Sovereign state: United Kingdom
- Post town: Skipton
- Postcode district: BD23
- Police: North Yorkshire
- Fire: North Yorkshire
- Ambulance: Yorkshire

Thorpe is a hamlet and civil parish in Wharfedale, North Yorkshire, England. It is 2 miles (3 km) south of Grassington and 6 miles (10 km) north of Skipton. At the 2011 census the population remained less than 100, so the details were included in the civil parish of Burnsall. However in 2015, North Yorkshire County Council estimated the population to be 50.

== History ==
Thorpe is mentioned in the Domesday Book as belonging to Osborn of Arques. The name derives from the Old Norse of þorp, which means "outlying farmstead". It was sometimes referred to as Thorpe Subtus Montem, and Thorpe-sub-Montem. The hamlet is secluded and surrounded by reef knolls, especially Elbolton Hill to the west, and Kail Hill to the east. All of these form part of the Cracoe Reef Knolls SSSI. This seclusion apparently meant that Thorpe remained unaffected by Scottish raiders, and was the place that local people went to in order to escape troops engaged in the English Civil War. These areas also have an extensive field system of lynchets, agricultural terraces that are notable within the Yorkshire Dales.

The hamlet is at an elevation of 725 feet (221 m), and faces northwards with the hill of Burnsall and Thorpe Fell directly behind it, rising to a height of 1,660 feet (506 m). The only road out of the village runs northwards towards Linton, and this road is part of the National Cycle Route 688. Whilst there are many farmhouses and barns in the hamlet, which are indicative of agriculture, (of the 21 listed buildings in the parish, at least half are associated with farming), it also historically had a large community of cobblers. Just to the south of the village are the remains of Elbolton Lead Mine, which was producing lead and fluorspar in the 19th century, closing down in 1888.

== Governance ==
Historically, the hamlet was in the parish of Burnsall, within Skipton Rural District, the wapentake of Staincliffe, in the West Riding of Yorkshire. In 1974, the area was moved from the West Riding into North Yorkshire, and Thorpe was made into its own civil parish. From 1974 to 2023 it was part of the Craven District, it is now administered by the unitary North Yorkshire Council.

The parish is rural and extends southwards over the summit of Burnsall and Thorpe Fell, covering 2,959.5 acres (1,197.68 hectares). The parish is represented at Westminster as part of the Skipton & Ripon Constituency.

Population of Thorpe 1871–2015
1871	1881	1891	1901	1911	1921	1931	1951	1961	1971	2015
58	67	46	46	54	57	54	53	41	31	50

Thorpe has always been in the ecclesiastical parish of Burnsall, and remains so in the 21st century, being part of the benefice of Linton, Burnsall and Rylstone. In the 19th century, the Wesleyan Methodists had a mission room in the hamlet.

== See also ==
- Listed buildings in Thorpe, North Yorkshire
