= Nesfield =

Village in North Yorkshire, England

Coordinates: 53.942°N 1.860°W

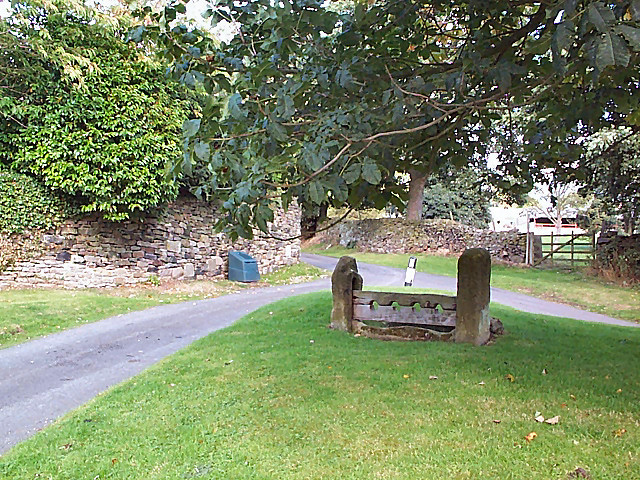
- Stocks, Nesfield Village

- Location within North Yorkshire
- OS grid reference: SE092495
- Civil parish: Nesfield with Langbar
- Unitary authority: North Yorkshire
- Ceremonial county: North Yorkshire
- Region: Yorkshire and the Humber
- Country: England
- Sovereign state: United Kingdom
- Post town: ILKLEY
- Postcode district: LS29
- Police: North Yorkshire
- Fire: North Yorkshire
- Ambulance: Yorkshire
- UK Parliament: Skipton and Ripon

Nesfield is a small village, (Note: In some modern day references, Nesfield is referred to as a hamlet. In English history, a village is usually defined as having amenities, but more importantly, a church. The church in the village of Nesfield was demolished in 1952.) 2 miles (3.2 km) north-west of Ilkley on the north bank of the River Wharfe, in the civil parish of Nesfield with Langbar, in the county of North Yorkshire, England. Historically in the West Riding of Yorkshire, the village sits at the southern edge of the Nidderdale Area of Outstanding Natural Beauty.

== History ==
Nesfield is recorded in the Domesday Book as belonging to Lord William Percy and as having two ploughlands. The name Nesfield derives from a mixture of Old English and Old Norse; Neates-feld, which means Open land where cattle were kept. The name has been recorded in different forms at least a dozen times, being Nacefeld in the Domesday Book, Nesfeld(e) in Qwhorfdale in the 15th century, and even Nesfeild (with the I and the E reversed) in the 17th century. However, the history of the settlement predates the Domesday Book as to the west of the village is the remains of Castleberg, an Iron Age or Roman fortified location. Many artefacts have been found on the mound including a copper key almost 2 feet (0.61 m) in length (surmised to be the key for gates to the Roman compound), urns and human bones. However, this is all conjecture and there is no evidence to support that Castleberg was part of the Roman Empire in the area, although Ilkley (Olicana), was known to have had a Roman settlement/camp. The site is 400 feet (120 m) above sea level, and is thought to have attracted early settlers as the ground around Castleberg falls away from the raised patch of land in all directions, so being naturally defensive.

The village used to be in the township of Nesfield with Langbar, in the wapentake of Claro, in what was the West Riding of Yorkshire. later, this became the Wharfedale Rural District, and since the Yorkshire boundary changes of 1974, the village is now in North Yorkshire (separated from West Yorkshire by the River Wharfe), and in the Nidderdale Area of Outstanding Natural Beauty. It used to be in the parish of Ilkley, but is now in the civil parish of Nesfield with Langbar, which at the 2011 Census had a population of 180. From 1974 to 2023 it was part of the Borough of Harrogate, it is now administered by the unitary North Yorkshire Council.

In 2015, North Yorkshire County Council estimated the population to be 170.

The stocks at the east end of the village date back to the 18th century and are now Grade II listed. A church was consecrated in the village in August 1892 on land donated by the Duke of Devonshire, and was known as Christ Church, being able to seat 120 people. Due to a lack of attendance, it was demolished in 1955. Besides agriculture, the other main industry in the village was a bark mill, which used horse or donkey power to grind up the bark for use in tannery. This mill is believed to have only operated during the 19th century.

A suspension bridge across the River Wharfe, erected in 1896, connects the village via West Hall to Addingham on the south side of the river.

== See also ==
- Listed buildings in Nesfield with Langbar

== Sources ==
- Nesfield Conservation Area Character Appraisal (PDF). nidderdaleaonb.org.uk (Report). Harrogate: Harrogate District Council. November 2011.
- Speight, Harry (1900). Upper Wharfedale. Being a complete account of the history, antiquities and scenery of the picturesque valley of the Wharfe, from Otley to Langstrothdale. London: Elliott Stock. OCLC 7225949.
