= Listed buildings in Hetton-cum-Bordley =

Hetton-cum-Bordley is a civil parish in the county of North Yorkshire, England. It contains twelve listed buildings that are recorded in the National Heritage List for England. All the listed buildings are designated at Grade II, the lowest of the three grades, which is applied to "buildings of national importance and special interest". The parish contains the villages of Hetton and Bordley and the surrounding countryside. Most of the listed buildings are houses, cottages and farmhouses, and the other listed building consists of structures associated with Winterburn Reservoir.

== Buildings ==
| Name and location | Photograph | Date | Notes |
|---|---|---|---|
| Ivy House; 54.02446°N 2.06203°W | — | c. 1600 | The house, which was later enlarged, is in stone, with a stone slate roof, gable coping and kneelers. There are two storeys and four bays. On the front is a doorway with a moulded four-centred arched head, above which is a date and initials. The windows are mullioned. At the rear, the right bay projects and is gabled, to the left is a projecting kitchen wing, and beyond is a single-storey dairy. |
| Park House; 54.06600°N 2.10237°W | | 17th century | The house, which was later extended, is in limestone with a stone slate roof. There are two storeys, the original part has two bays, to the left is an 18th-century slightly recessed bay, and to the right is a stable bay. The original part has a doorway with a chamfered surround, above which is a re-set datestone. The windows are recessed with chamfered mullions and hood moulds. The added bay contains a doorway and sash windows, and in the stable bay is a doorway and a square loading door above. |
| Norton View Farmhouse and barn 54.02467°N 2.06048°W | — | Mid to late 17th century | The farmhouse and barn are in stone with stone slate roofs. The house has two storeys, four bays, and a central cross-wing containing a doorway with a moulded surround and a moulded hood mould. The windows vary and include cross windows, sashes, casements, a fire window with a chamfered surround, and a fixed light. External steps lead up to a hayloft. The barn to the right contains a central wagon entrance with a chamfered surround and a segmental arch of voussoirs. |
| Dumpty Cottage; 54.02642°N 2.06095°W | — | 1673 | The cottage is in stone with a stone slate roof. On the front, to the right, is a projecting porch, the entrance with a chamfered surround, and an initialled segmental-arched lintel. The inner doorway has a chamfered surround, a dated and initialled Tudor arched lintel, and a hood mould. To the left is a fixed light, and the other windows are double-chamfered and mullioned with hood moulds. |
| Lainger House; 54.06078°N 2.07659°W | | 1673 | The house, which incorporates earlier material, is in stone, with quoins, and a stone slate roof with gable copings and bulbous kneelers. There are two storeys, three bays, and a two-bay farm building on the right. The left bay projects as a two-storey porch, and the doorway in the right return has an elaborate moulded surround with quoined jambs, including the date, initials and various motifs, and above it is an elaborate hood mould. On the front of the house, the hood mould contains parts of a carved figure, surmounted by perching ledges. Most of the windows are sashes. |
| Fell View; 54.02584°N 2.05908°W | — | Late 17th century | A farmhouse in stone, with a stone slate roof, gable coping and kneelers. There are two storeys, three bays, and a later rear extension. The central doorway has a chamfered surround, and the windows have double-chamfered mullions with some mullions missing, and they contain casements. Over the ground floor is a continuous hood mould, stepped over the doorway. |
| Skeldgate and Stable End; 54.02179°N 2.08080°W | | 1695 | A farmhouse and stable, the stable converted into a cottage, in stone with a stone slate roof. There are two storeys, and the garden front has three bays. The entrance in the porch has a moulded surround and a basket arched lintel. The windows are mullioned, with some mullions missing. In the upper floor is a blind oculus with a chamfered surround. On the left return are external steps to a former hayloft, on a re-used octagonal shaft with a moulded capital. |
| Meadow Croft; 54.02535°N 2.05965°W | — | Mid 18th century | A farmhouse, later a private house, in stone, with a stone slate roof, gable coping and kneelers. There are two storeys and two bays. The doorway has a plain surround, a pulvinated frieze and a pediment, and the windows have flat-faced mullions and contain casements. |
| Rock Farmhouse; 54.02668°N 2.05901°W | — | 1758 | The farmhouse is in stone with eaves modillions and a stone slate roof. There are two storeys, and the rear faces the street. The front has two bays, and a central doorway with a plain surround, over which is an initialled datestone. The windows are mullioned, those on the front with flat-faced mullions, and at the rear they are double chamfered. At the rear is a mullioned and transomed stair window. |
| Benson Cottage; 54.02633°N 2.05898°W | — | Mid to late 18th century | The cottage is in stone with a stone slate roof, two storeys and two bays. The central doorway has a plain surround, and the windows are recessed and contain flat-faced mullions and casements. Above the doorway is a carved panel. |
| Hetton House; 54.02393°N 2.06202°W | | Late 18th century | The house is in stone, with a string course, shaped eaves modillions, and a stone slate roof with gable coping and kneelers. There are two storeys, three bays, and a recessed bay on the right. The doorway has a plain surround and an open pediment, to its left is a bay window, and the other windows are sashes. In the right bay is a doorway with a pulvinated frieze and a hood mould, above which is an inscribed panel. The right return contains an upper floor entrance with a re-used Tudor arched lintel. |
| Wave wall, water-ladder, and attached buildings 54.03704°N 2.08595°W | | c. 1885–93 | The wave wall and other structures are at the south end of Winterburn Reservoir. The wall extends for about 175 metres (574 ft), and contains a built out valve tower with two cast iron valve capstans. At the east end is a twin-arched bridge crossing a spillway which includes a weir and a paved and stepped water ladder. At the southwest corner is a low-level valve tower outlet, and to the south is a stone control weir and a gauging house. |
