= Hartlington =

Village and civil parish in North Yorkshire, England

Coordinates: 54.04767°N 1.94327°W

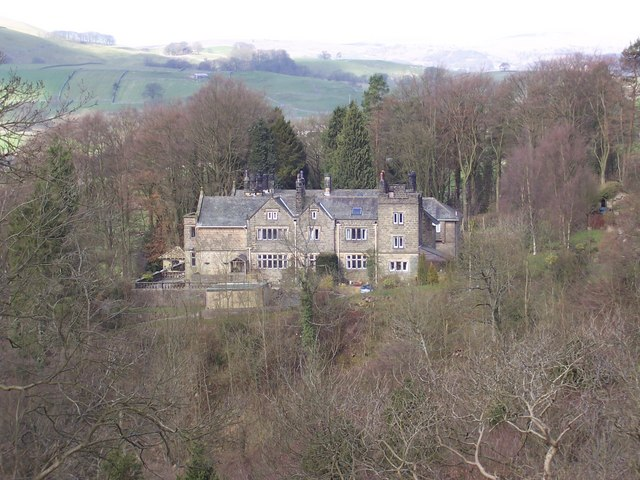
- Hartlington Hall

- Location within North Yorkshire
- Population: 50
- OS grid reference: SE038613
- Civil parish: Hartlington
- Unitary authority: North Yorkshire
- Ceremonial county: North Yorkshire
- Region: Yorkshire and the Humber
- Country: England
- Sovereign state: United Kingdom
- Post town: SKIPTON
- Postcode district: BD23
- Dialling code: 01756
- Police: North Yorkshire
- Fire: North Yorkshire
- Ambulance: Yorkshire
- UK Parliament: Skipton and Ripon

Hartlington is a small village and civil parish in the county of North Yorkshire, England. At the 2011 Census, the population of the parish was around 50. Details are included in the civil parish of Hebden, North Yorkshire. It is under a mile east from the nearby village of Burnsall, which can be reached by going down Cross Hill. Hartlington is also just over a mile west of the village of Appletreewick. It is around 4 miles south-east of the small town of Grassington, and can be reached by going through the village of Hebden. Hartlington Raikes, one of the main roads in Hartlington, goes from Lower Hartlington to Upper Hartlington, to the B6265 approximately 1.5 miles away. The road then turns into Hartlington Moor Lane, which goes up to Grimwith Reservoir.

Hartlington is one of the contenders for the smallest and least populous village in the Yorkshire Dales, but it and the surrounding villages are at the centre of attention of hikers and tourists, as well as cyclists who pass through when using National Cycle Route 688.

Hartlington is home to Burnsall Park, which was a popular area for tourists to visit, by the banks of the River Wharfe, which first opened in the early 1950s. In 2020, the park went viral on the social media platform TikTok, which caused the park to receive an influx of customers. However, the park closed in July 2026, over 75 years since opening.

Until 1974 it was part of the West Riding of Yorkshire. From 1974 to 2023 it was part of the Craven District, it is now administered by the unitary North Yorkshire Council.

== See also ==
- Listed buildings in Hartlington
