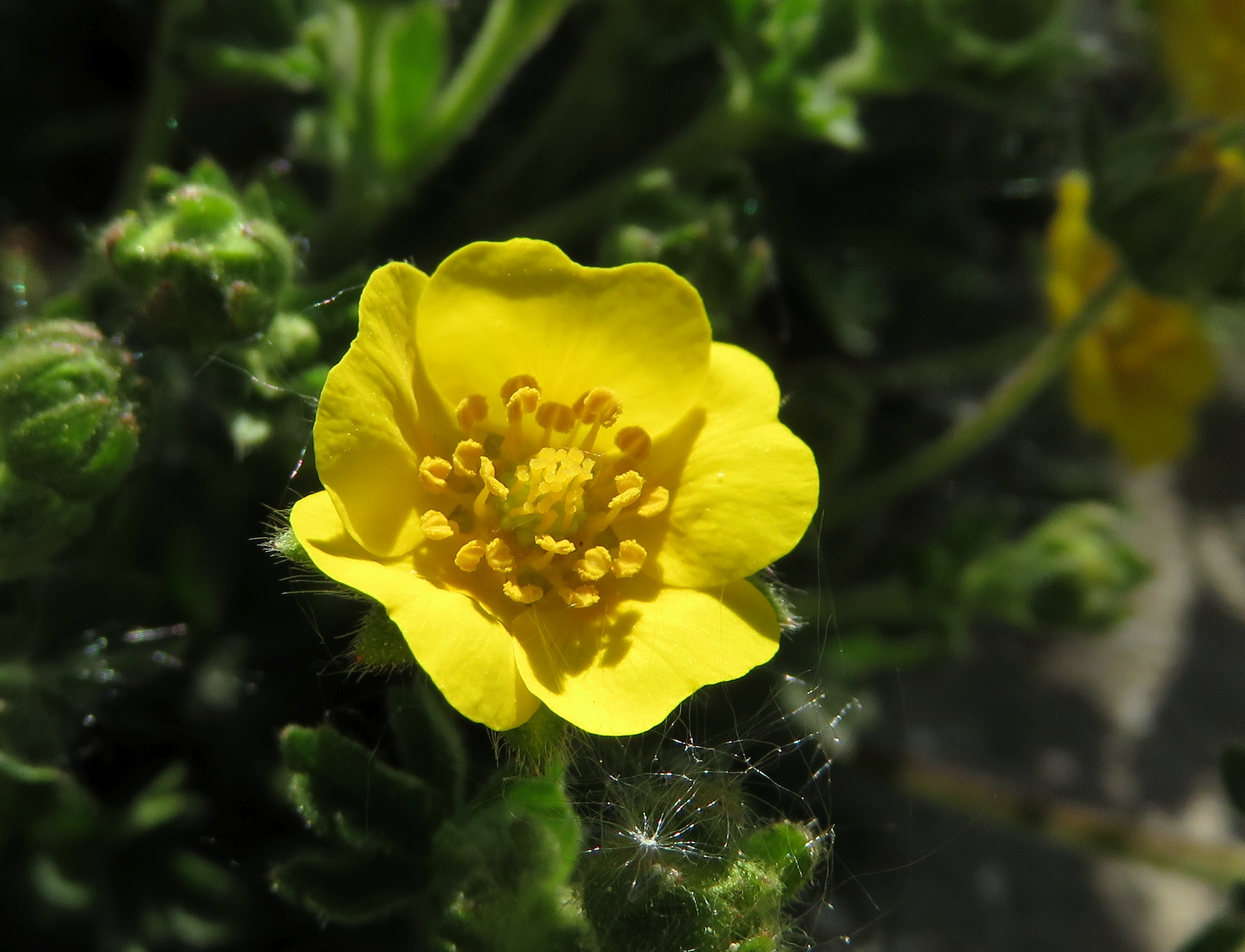

Scientific classification
- Kingdom: Plantae
- Clade: Embryophytes
- Clade: Tracheophytes
- Clade: Spermatophytes
- Clade: Angiosperms
- Clade: Eudicots
- Clade: Rosids
- Order: Rosales
- Family: Rosaceae
- Genus: Potentilla
- Species: P. crantzii

Binomial name
- Potentilla crantzii Crantz & Fritsch

= Potentilla crantzii =

Species of flowering plant

Potentilla crantzii, the alpine cinquefoil, is a flowering plant in the family Rosaceae. It is native to North America.
