= Burnsall =

Village and civil parish in North Yorkshire, England

Coordinates: 54°02′53″N 1°57′05″W

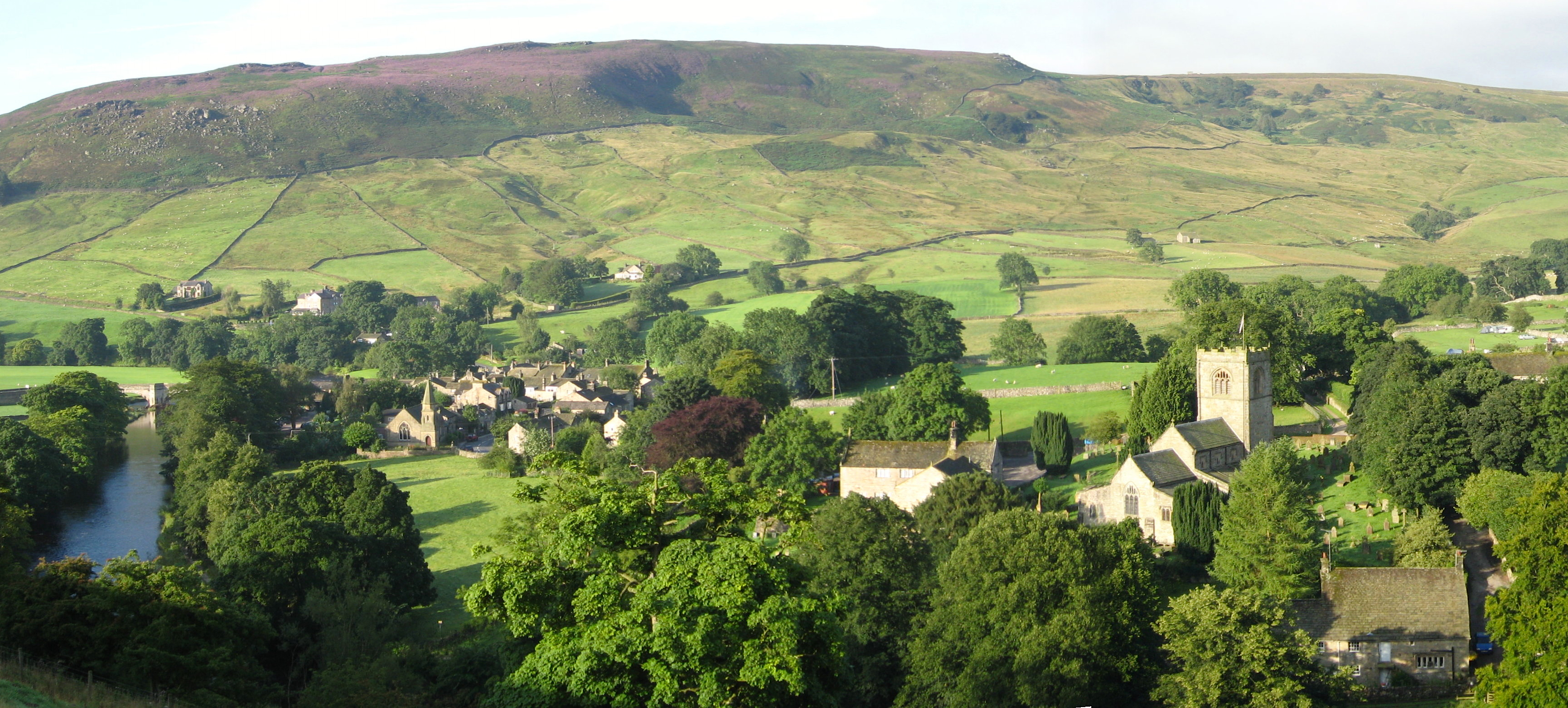
- Village of Burnsall, from east above, showing bridge, Wharfe, chapel, Dalesway path (2008)

- Location within North Yorkshire
- Population: 110 (2011)
- OS grid reference: SE031615
  - London: 190 mi (310 km) SSE
- Civil parish: Burnsall
- Unitary authority: North Yorkshire
- Ceremonial county: North Yorkshire
- Region: Yorkshire and the Humber
- Country: England
- Sovereign state: United Kingdom
- Post town: SKIPTON
- Postcode district: BD23
- Police: North Yorkshire
- Fire: North Yorkshire
- Ambulance: Yorkshire
- UK Parliament: Skipton and Ripon

Burnsall is a village and civil parish in the county of North Yorkshire, England. It is situated on the River Wharfe in Wharfedale, and is in the Yorkshire Dales National Park.

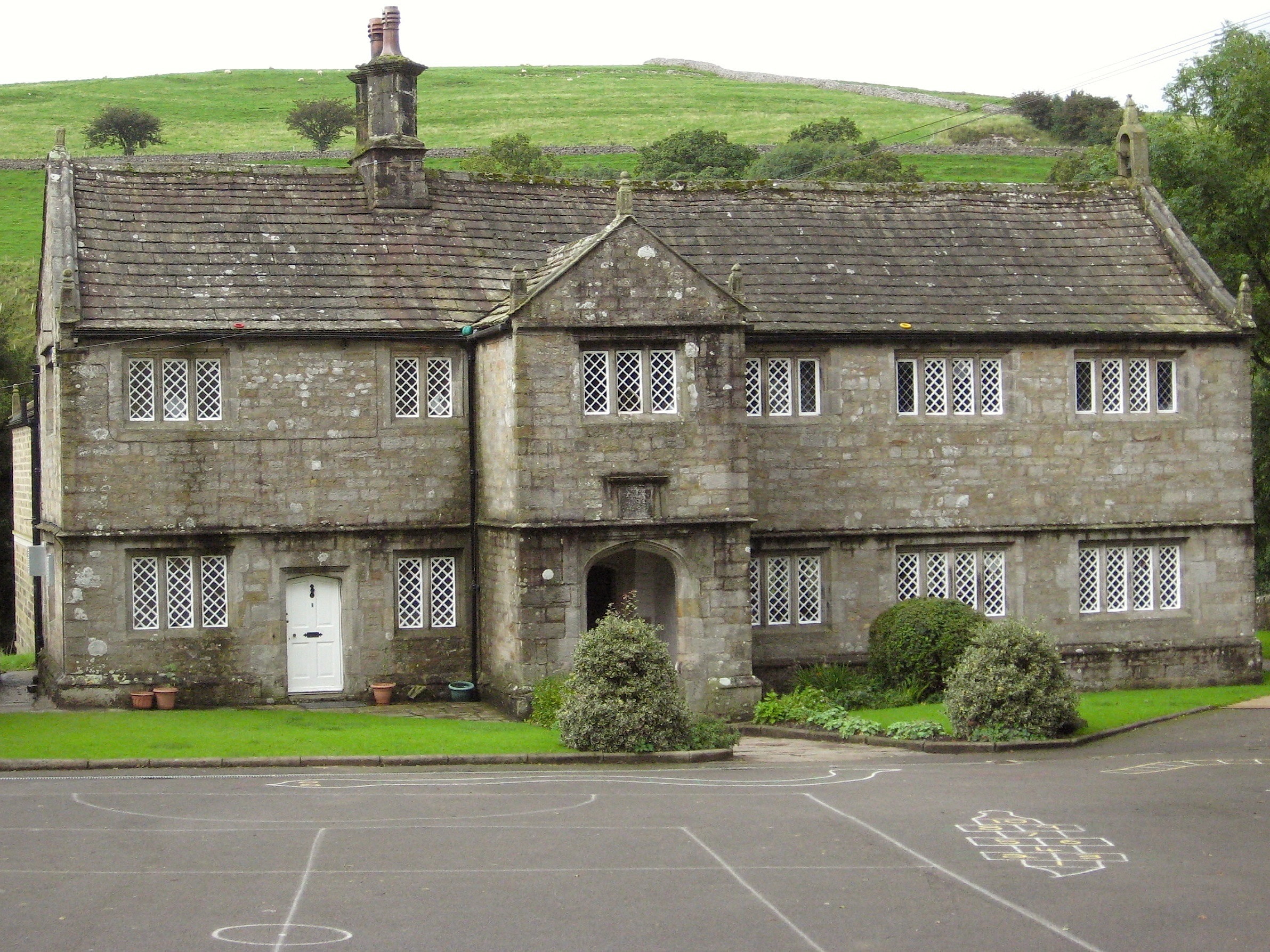
The Old Grammar School, founded by William Craven

The name Burnsall derives from the Old English Brynishalh meaning 'Bryni's nook of land'.

The village is approximately 2 miles (3 km) south-east from Grassington. It has a parish church, a chapel, two hotels with restaurants, a public house, and a primary school. Burnsall Primary School, a Grade II listed building, is in the original 1602 grammar school building, a legacy of William Craven of nearby Appletreewick. There is a five-arched bridge over which the Dalesway passes. A path along the river from Burnsall to Hebden, 1 mile (2 km) to the north-west, dates to Viking times.

The historic parish of Burnsall occupied a large part of upper Wharfedale. It included the townships of Appletreewick, Bordley, Conistone with Kilnsey, Cracoe, Hartlington, Hetton, Rylstone and Thorpe, all of which became separate civil parishes in 1866. The parish was in Staincliffe Wapentake and in the West Riding of Yorkshire until 1974, when it was transferred to North Yorkshire. From 1974 to 2023 it was part of the Craven District, it is now administered by the unitary North Yorkshire Council.

The 2001 Census gave Burnsall parish a population of 112, decreasing to 110 at the 2011 census.

The ecclesiastical parish of Burnsall is in the Diocese of Leeds. St Wilfrid's Church, Burnsall, a Grade I listed building, is almost entirely Perpendicular. It contains an 11th-century font carved with bird and beasts, twelve Anglo-Saxon sculpture fragments and a 14th-century alabaster panel depicting the Adoration of the Magi. The church-yard is entered from the main road by a lychgate.

Burnsall is a centre for walking, trout fishing, picnics, and weddings. An annual feast day games in August includes amateur competitions, tug of war and fell races. The village cricket pitch is below Burnsall Fell and is half enclosed by the river.

== See also ==
- Listed buildings in Burnsall
