= William Craven (Lord Mayor of London) =

English merchant

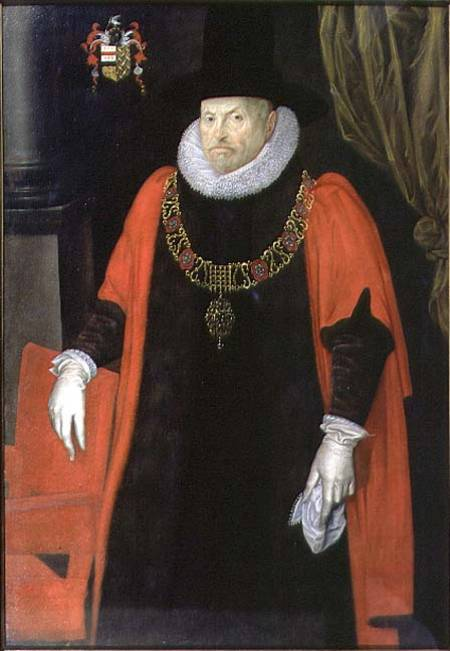
- Sir William Craven (by Marcus Gheeraerts the Younger)

Lord Mayor of the City of London
- In office 1610
- Preceded by: Thomas Cambell
- Succeeded by: James Pemberton

Personal details
- Born: 1548
- Died: 18 July 1618 (aged 69–70)
- Spouse: Elizabeth Whitmore
- Children: 5, including William and John
- Parents: William Craven (father); Beatrix Hunter (mother)

Sir William Craven (1548 – 18 July 1618) was an English merchant who was Lord Mayor of London in 1610. It has been noted that the story of Dick Whittington has some similarities to Craven's career, though the story was first published before Craven became Lord Mayor.

== Life ==
He was the second son of William Craven and Beatrix, daughter of John Hunter, and grandson of John Craven, and was born at Appletreewick, a village in the parish of Burnsall, near Skipton in the West Riding of Yorkshire, about 1548. The date is made probable because he took up his freedom in 1569. At the age of thirteen or fourteen, he was sent down to London by the common carrier and bound apprentice to Robert Hulson, a merchant tailor, who lived in Watling Street. Having been admitted to the freedom of the Merchant Taylors' Company on 4 November 1569, Craven appears to have entered into business with Hulson, but subsequently quarrelled with him, with an arbitrated settlement in 1583.

In 1588 Craven took a lease from the Mercers' Company of a mansion house in Watling Street, where he carried on business with Robert and John Parker until his death. He was elected warden of his company on 4 July 1593, and on 19 July 1594 he was made one of the court of assistants. On 2 April 1600 he was elected alderman for Bishopsgate ward, and on 14 February 1601 he was chosen sheriff of London. On 15 May 1602, he became alderman of Cordwainer ward. He was knighted at Whitehall by James I on 26 July 1603.

Craven was lord mayor of London for 1610–11, and the show, which had been suspended for some years, was revived with splendour. Christian, Prince of Anhalt, was entertained with his entourage at the feast at the Guildhall afterwards. On 14 January 1612 Craven became alderman of Lime Street ward; he had moved his residence from St. Antholin's to a house built by Stephen Kirton, in the parish of St. Andrew Undershaft, Cornhill. This house was on the south side of Leadenhall Street; it was leased to the East India Company in 1620 and pulled down, and the East India House erected in 1726. During Craven's mayoralty, his name appears in connection with loans to the king.

In 1616 Lady Elizabeth Coke, wife of Sir Edward Coke, on the occasion of her quarrel with her husband, was at his request handed over to the hospitality of Craven, who must have entertained her at his house in Leadenhall Street. He is stated to have laid the foundation stone of the new Aldersgate on 26 May 1617.

On 1 July 1618, he attended the court of the Merchant Taylors' Company for the last time. He was buried at St. Andrew Undershaft on 11 August 1618.

== Family ==
He married Elizabeth Whitmore, probably about 1605; she was a daughter of William Whitmore (d.1593) of Apley Hall, Salop and Balmes Manor, Hackney, haberdasher and alderman of London. Her second brother was Sir George Whitmore (d.1654), Lord Mayor of London. They had five children:

- Elizabeth Craven (1600–1662), married Percy Herbert, 2nd Baron Powis, in 1622
- Mary Craven (1602–1634), married Thomas Coventry, 2nd Baron Coventry, in 1627
- William Craven (1608–1697), created Baron Craven of Hamstead Marshall in 1627 and Earl of Craven in 1664
- John Craven (1610–1648), MP for Tewkesbury, created Baron Craven of Ryton in 1643, founder of the Craven scholarships at Oxford and Cambridge
- Thomas Craven (died 20 November 1636)

Craven's will was openly read in court on 29 July 1618.

== Legacy ==
In 1596 he made a donation towards the building of the library of St John's College, Oxford, recorded on one of the library windows.

He founded the grammar school in Burnsall, North Yorkshire, in 1602; this building has been in use as a school ever since then and now houses Burnsall Primary School. The inscription "William Craven Alderman of London founder of this Schoole Anno Domini 1601" can still be seen on a panel above the school door. In 1604 he was one of the patrons of ‘the scheme of a new college after the manner of a university designed at Ripon, Yorkshire’. On 9 January 1611, he was elected president of Christ's Hospital, a post he occupied up to his death. His donations to the hospital included lands to the value of £1,000 at Ugley in Essex. On 2 July 1613, he conveyed to St John's College the advowson of Creeke in Northamptonshire ‘upon trust that one of the ten senior fellows elected from (Merchant Taylors') School should be presented thereto’. In 1617 he joined with others in subscribing £1,000 towards the repair and decoration of St. Antholin's Church.

Thanks to the money he left behind, his widow Dame Elizabeth Craven was able to purchase the 13th century Stokesay Castle, which she renovated.

== See also ==
Earl of Craven

Civic offices
Preceded by Thomas Cambell	Lord Mayor of the City of London; 1610	Succeeded by James Pemberton
