= River Wharfe =

River in Yorkshire, England

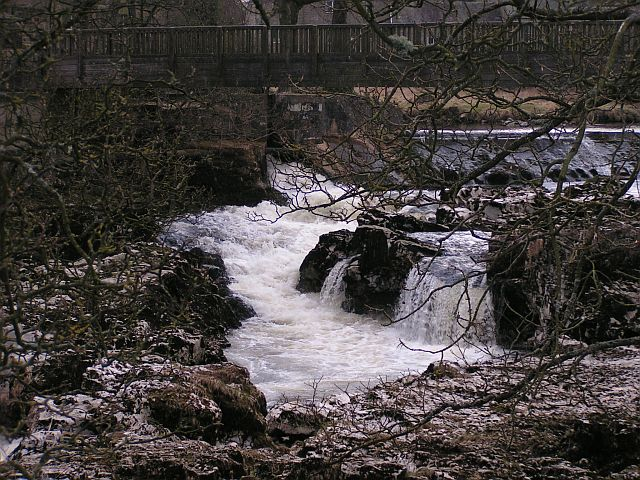
- Linton Falls, on the upper Wharfe near Grassington

Location
- Country: England

Physical characteristics
- Source
  - location: Beckermonds, Langstrothdale Chase
  - coordinates: 54.217481°N 2.194231°W
  - elevation: 310 m (1,020 ft)
- Mouth
  - location: River Ouse at Wharfe's Mouth, near Cawood
  - coordinates: 53.8441°N 1.129544°W
  - elevation: 4.9 m (16 ft)
- Length: 104.6 km (65.0 mi)

The River Wharfe (/hwɔːrf/ WHORF) is a river in Yorkshire, England originating within the Yorkshire Dales National Park. For much of its middle course it is the county boundary between West Yorkshire and North Yorkshire. Its valley is known as Wharfedale.

The watercourse first becomes known as the River Wharfe at the confluence of Greenfield Beck and Oughtershaw Beck at Beckermonds. Flowing initially through Langstrothdale, it then passes by, or in some cases through, Kettlewell, Grassington, Bolton Abbey, Addingham, Ilkley, Burley-in-Wharfedale, Otley, Wetherby and Tadcaster. It then flows into the River Ouse near Cawood. The section of the river from its source to around Addingham is in Upper Wharfedale and has a very different character to the river downstream.

The Wharfe is 65 miles (104.6 km) long (before it joins the Ouse), making it the 21st longest river in Britain. It is a public navigation from the weir at Tadcaster to its junction with the Ouse near Cawood and is tidal from Ulleskelf to the Ouse.

== Etymology ==
The name Wharfe, at least in its present form, derives from the Old Norse hverfi meaning 'a bend, crook, turn', a name implying that the river was winding. However, this Old Norse form was probably adapted from an earlier name: a Roman altar found in Ilkley is inscribed "VERBEIAE SACRUM" ('sacred to Verbeia') and apparently refers to the River Wharfe (personified as a goddess). The proto-Indo-European root *wer-, relating to turning or twisting, readily picked up a -b- extension to yield words such as Latin verbena, English warp, and their cognates, which displeases those who believe the name was created in a Celtic language. Hence Patrick Sims-Williams's association of the name with Old Irish ferb ('cattle') and Andrew Breeze's case for a meaning 'powerful striker'.

== Course ==
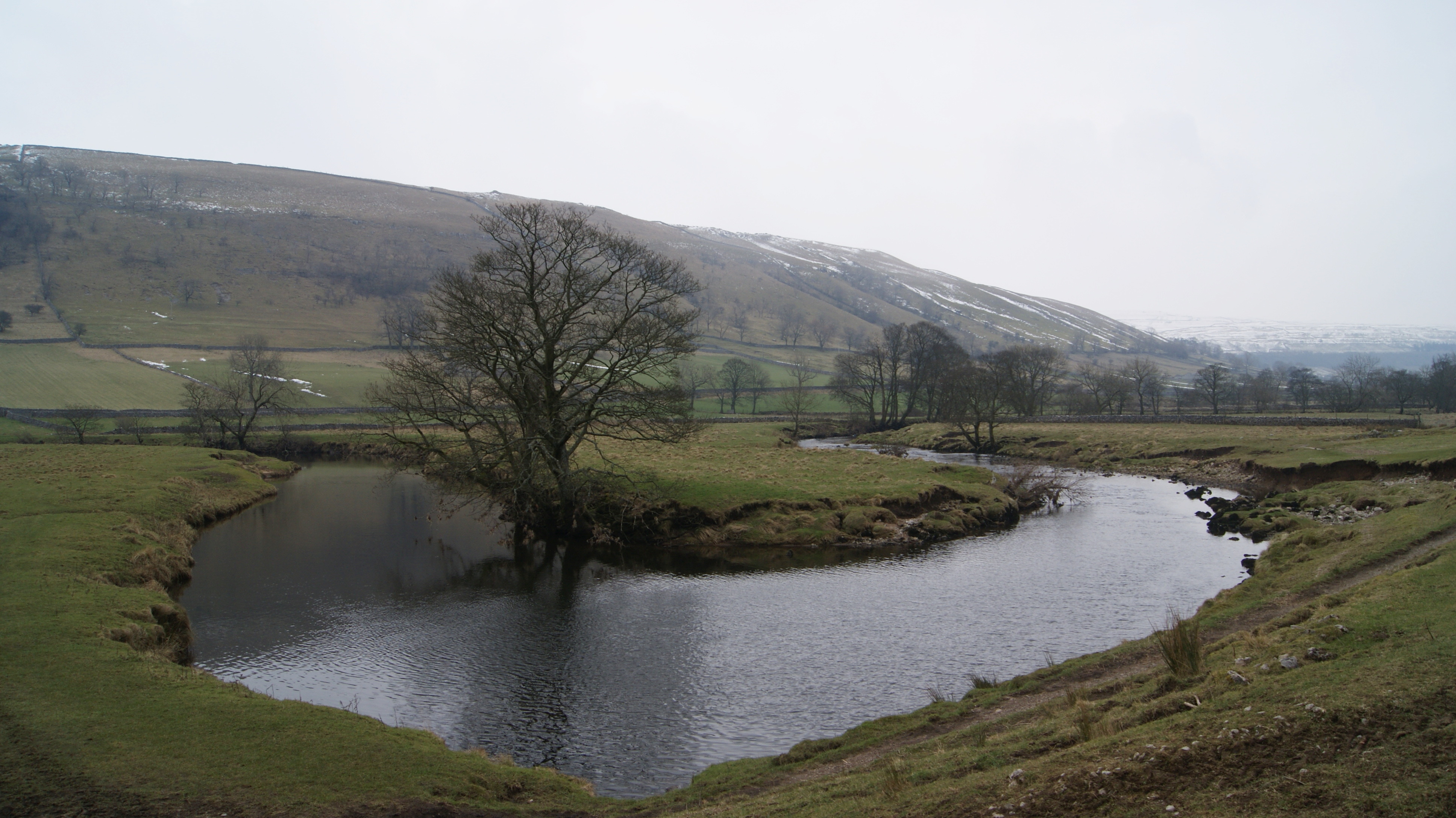
The River Wharfe meandering between Starbotton and Kettlewell.

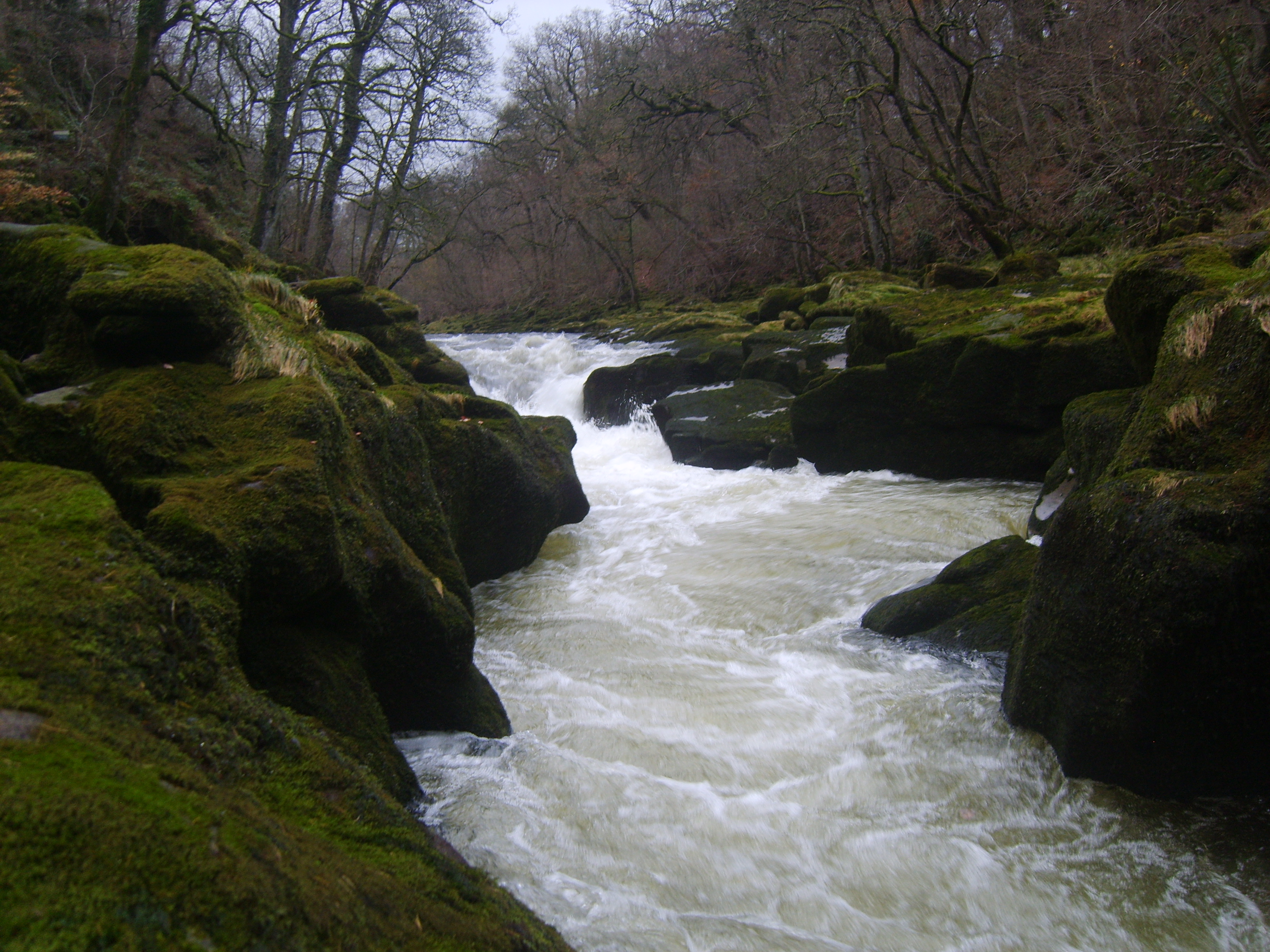
The rapids of The Strid

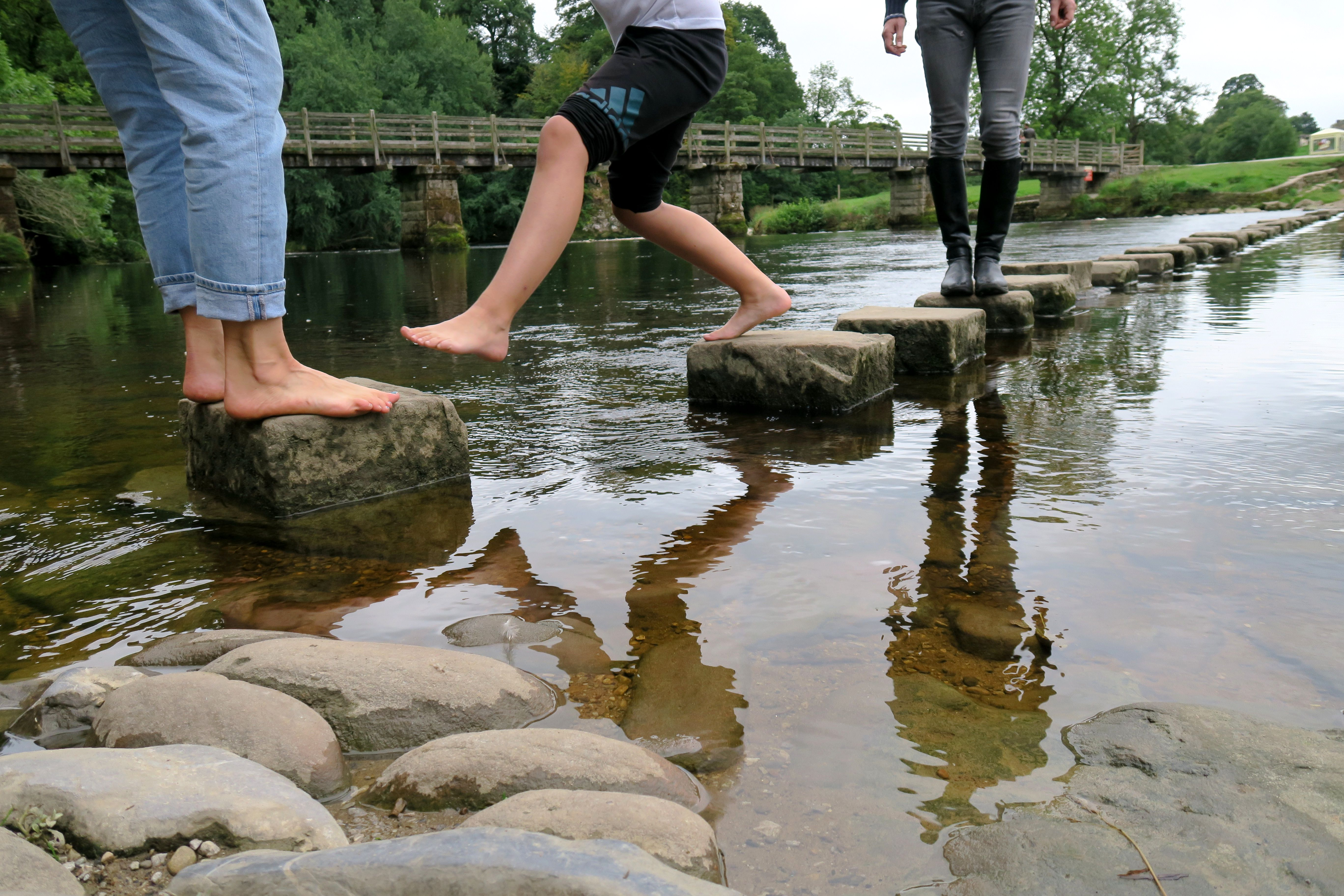
Stepping stones and footbridge in Bolton Abbey

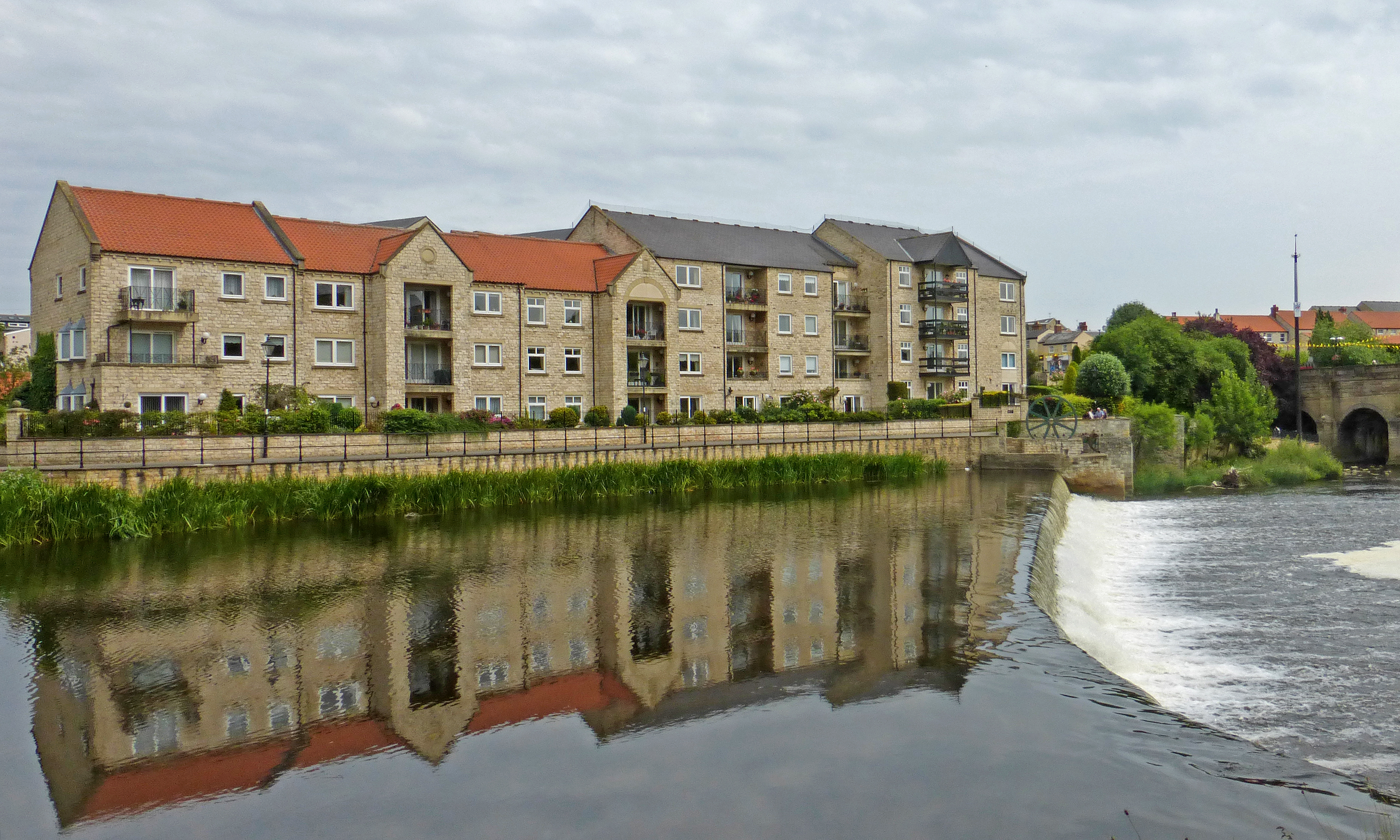
The River Wharfe at Wetherby, the largest settlement on the course of the Wharfe

The river is deemed to start at the confluence of Oughtershaw Beck and Green Field Beck in Langstrothdale near Beckermonds. It flows east and south-east taking the flows from several small streams originating on Yockenthwaite Moor on the north bank and Horse Head Moor on the south bank. After Hubberholme, the river flows south past Buckden and Starbotton and then south-east past Kettlewell before flowing south again. Near Conistone are the gentle waterfalls of Scar Lash. Near Grassington, the river turns south-east over Linton Falls. South of Appletreewick, the river flows south-west for a short distance until it reaches Gill Beck and returns southward. To the north of Bolton Bridge, the river narrows and goes over waterfalls in an area known as The Strid. The river winds south and south-east towards Ilkley where it heads east through Otley and Collingham. It briefly flows north to Wetherby before turning south and then south-east through Tadcaster to the confluence with the River Ouse.

=== The Strid ===
The Strid (grid reference: SE 064565; 54°00′14″N 1°54′12″W) is a series of waterfalls and rapids contained within a 15-foot (4.6 m) deep channel cut into the local sandstone. The River Wharfe narrows dramatically here from approximately 90 ft (27 m) wide, just to the north of the start of the Strid, to about 6.5 ft (2 m) wide. It is especially dangerous as both banks are undercut, and it has been the scene of a number of fatalities, including those of a honeymooning couple in 1998. The Strid walk is very popular and is accessed from the car park at Bolton Abbey.

Its name comes from the Old English stryth, meaning 'turmoil'. This was later corrupted to Strid, referring to 'the possibility of striding across'.

The Strid's hazardous nature is referenced in several literary works, including The Force of Prayer by William Wordsworth, and The Striding Place by Gertrude Atherton.

=== Linton Falls ===
Linton Falls (grid reference: SE 001633) are located close to the village of Linton, just south of Grassington. There is a footbridge straddling the falls for viewing.

=== Water levels ===
Monitoring station	Station elevation	Low water level	High water level	Record high level
Kettlewell	212 m (696 ft)	0.17 m (0.56 ft)	2 m (6.6 ft)	2.54 m (8.3 ft)
Grassington	171 m (561 ft)	0 m (0 ft)	1.5 m (4.9 ft)	2.79 m (9.2 ft)
Ilkley	78 m (256 ft)	0.09 m (0.30 ft)	2.9 m (9.5 ft)	3.88 m (12.7 ft)
Otley	56 m (184 ft)	0.36 m (1.2 ft)	1.5 m (4.9 ft)	2.46 m (8.1 ft)
Pool Bridge	46 m (151 ft)	0.09 m (0.30 ft)	2.9 m (9.5 ft)	3.77 m (12.4 ft)
Arthington	46 m (151 ft)	0.32 m (1.0 ft)	3.3 m (11 ft)	4.14 m (13.6 ft)
Collingham	25 m (82 ft)	0.35 m (1.1 ft)	1.59 m (5.2 ft)	4.7 m (15 ft)
Wetherby	25 m (82 ft)	0.4 m (1.3 ft)	1.8 m (5.9 ft)	3.10 m (10.2 ft)
Tadcaster	11 m (36 ft)	0.18 m (0.59 ft)	2.9 m (9.5 ft)	3.79 m (12.4 ft)
Cock Beck Sluices	6 m (20 ft)	3.44 m (11.3 ft)	7.3 m (24 ft)	9.26 m (30.4 ft)
Fleet Pumping Station	6 m (20 ft)	2 m (6.6 ft)	6.5 m (21 ft)	7.35 m (24.1 ft)

- Low and high water levels are an average figure.

A serious flood in 1686 carried away a number of bridges and buildings.

== Natural history ==
=== Fauna ===
More than 230 species of bird have been observed along the river valley including red grouse, stonechat, whinchat, golden plover, pied flycatcher, redstart, wood warbler, common sandpiper, grey wagtail, dipper, tawny owl, sparrowhawk, great spotted woodpecker, nuthatch, treecreeper and, in wetter places, common snipe and woodcock, chiffchaff, willow warbler, garden warbler, and twite.

The Wharfe has populations of signal crayfish and the few white-clawed crayfish remaining are at great risk. The river is also home to a colony of fine-lined pea mussels. The creature is mostly congregated in rivers in Wales and central and southern England; the presence of the mussels in the Wharfe has been noted as a "considerable outpost".

There are populations of rabbit, red fox, grey squirrel, otter, water voles and deer.

=== Flora ===
Ferns found here include wall rue, maidenhair spleenwort, brittle bladder-fern, Hart's-tongue and hard shield-fern. In Upper Wharfedale the scars and screes support a range of plants including the alpine cinquefoil and hoary whitlowgrass. Also to be found are lesser meadow-rue, goldenrod, scabious and bloody crane's-bill with, to a lesser extent, mountain melick, limestone fern, wood crane's-bill and melancholy thistle, green spleenwort, wall lettuce and hairy stonecrop.

Lower down the valley, species including alpine cinquefoil, lily-of-the-valley, mountain melick and herb paris, blue sesleria, common valerian and wild angelica. The limestone outcrops have uncommon species including rock whitebeam and Solomon's seal as well as bird's-eye primrose, butterwort, rockrose, dropwort and limestone bedstraw.

The limestone pavements of the area are a habitat for several species usually confined to woodlands, such as dog's mercury, wood anemone and ramsons. Rarer species to be found in the grikes include baneberry and downy currant. Ferns in the moist grikes include rigid buckler-fern. Also to be found are alternate-leaved golden saxifrage, reed canary-grass and stone bramble.

Some of the inaccessible cliffs are home to ledge dwelling flora including mosses and liverworts, such as red leskea, sharp rock-bristle and the very rare Zygodon gracilis. The ledges also support woodrush, polypody and water avens, purple saxifrage, yellow saxifrage, hoary whitlowgrass and roseroot.

Blue moor-grass can also be found, with sheep's-fescue and herbs such as thyme, salad burnet and common rock-rose. There is wild thyme, common milkwort, fairy flax, bird's-foot trefoil, autumn gentian, harebell, eyebright.

Species of tree and shrub include ash, downy birch, hazel, hawthorn, yew and rowan. In the woods shrubs such as wild privet and spindle can be found. More rare is dark red helleborine.

== Geology ==
Upper Wharfedale is an area whose rocks date from the Early Carboniferous period and lies north-west of Burnsall. Its main features are the Great Scar Limestone which forms a base to the overlying Yoredale Beds, a 300-metre (980 ft) deep strata of hard limestones, sandstones and shale. These have been slightly tilted, toward the east. To the south-east of the area is the Millstone Grit laid down in the Late Carboniferous period, and covered by heather moorland, hard crags and tors.

Weathering of the Yoredale Beds has produced a stepped profile to the valley sides, consisting of a shelf of limestone, sometimes grassy but often displaying such karst features as limestone pavement, gorges and sinkholes. During the last ice age, the local ice cap at the head of the Dales fed glaciers to produce the classic U-shaped profiles seen today.

Where the river valley changes course into Lower Wharfedale, the change of underlying rock can be seen in the darker stone in the field walls. The Millstone Grit outcrops at the Cow and Calf Rocks near Ilkley form a rolling dissected plateau. Due to the impermeable nature of the rock, blanket bogs and mires form, and drier areas have wet and dry heaths and acid grasslands.

Coarse sandstones in the area are known as Addingham Edge and Bramhope Grits. The Otley Shell Beds become exposed at Otley Chevin. At Great Dib Wood the Otley Shell Bed is sandwiched between two Namurian sandstones.

Glacial lakes once filled Lower Wharfedale in which were deposited sand and gravel. These deposits were extracted and now form the basis of the Otley Wetland Reserve, and Ben Rhydding and Knotford Nook gravel pits.

== History ==
The name Wharfe appears to be recorded in the form Verbeiae on a Roman inscription at Ilkley, dedicated to Verbeia, thought to be the tutelary goddess of the river. The name is probably of Brythonic origin, from a root meaning "winding". Later forms of the name were probably influenced by the Old Norse hwerfi, meaning "bend".

Iron Age fields and hut circles can still be seen in outline on the hills above Grassington and Kettlewell. The Romans built a road through Wharfedale that went over Stake Moss into neighbouring Wensleydale. The local British tribe of Brigantes were subdued by the Romans in AD 74. The Romans mined lead in the hills on Greenhow Hill overlooking Appletreewick until AD 410. After AD 620 the Romano-Britons were joined by Angles and increased the amount of forest clearing to establish fields for crops and animals. These were overrun by Danes initially before they too settled to farming near Burnsall and Thorpe. Vikings then settled the area in the 10th century, lending their language to some of the names of hamlets and landscape features of Upper Wharfedale, especially near the head of the valley. During Anglo-Saxon times, large estates were established and the River Wharfe and its valley came under the protection of Earl Edwin of Bolton-in-Craven. After the Norman invasion, the lands were given to Robert Romilly.

In medieval times low intensity methods were used to produce both crops and livestock but the great monasteries of Fountains, Rievaulx and Bolton Priory had large sheep flocks and sold their wool on the European market. In 1155, Alice de Romilly donated land for the establishment of Bolton Priory and land at Kilnsey to Fountains Abbey. The monasteries helped develop vast sheep farms and the founding of drove roads, which can still be seen and walked today. The success of the monasteries was also responsible for the growth of the market towns of Grassington and Kettlewell.

When the monasteries were dissolved in 1539, and wool prices fell, many tenant farmers took to cattle and sheep rearing. However, at the end of the 17th century there was still small-scale arable production. By the early 19th century there was a demand for food from the growing industrial towns and farmers and many farms began to produce milk from the lower lands and use the higher fells for sheep.

On 5 July 2014, the Tour de France Stage 1 from Leeds to Harrogate passed through Wharfedale along roads running close to the river. The route in Wharfedale started near the official start at Harewood and ended just after Buckden when the competitors turned to climb over Kidstones Pass near Cray.

The river has featured in films. In 1992, the town of Grassington was used as a filming location for Wuthering Heights. The 2003 film, Calendar Girls, was filmed at several locations in the river valley including Ilkley Moor, Buckden, Burnsall, Kettlewell and Kilnsey.

== Economy ==
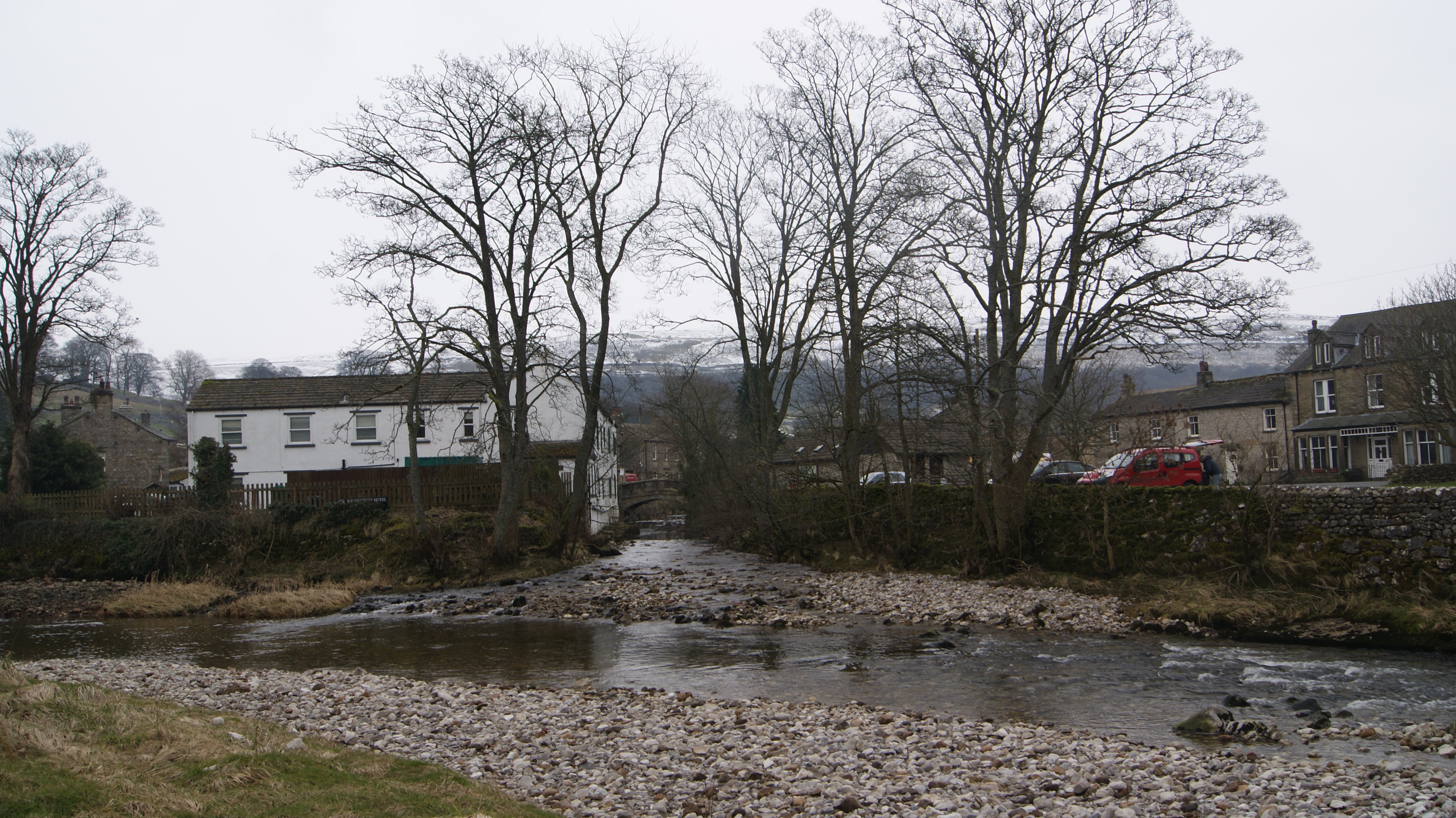
Kettlewell Beck joining the River Wharfe

During the 1990s there had been an increase in second home ownership, particularly in the Upper Wharfedale area. The 1991 census had shown 13% of homes in the Craven district were classified as second properties. The 2001 census showed that the figure for Upper Wharfedale was 15%, but it had dropped to only 7% by 2011.

Upper Wharfedale has been traditionally associated with farming, but there has been a change in the numbers and types of employment. Whilst there were declines in the number of people in this industry, farming accounted directly for 9.16% of employment in 2001 but this had increased to 11.27% by 2011.

Lead mining was once the main industry in Wharfedale. From the 17th century to the late 19th century it employed hundreds of men and boys, exploiting the veins in the limestone at Greenhow, Hebden, Grassington, Linton and Conistone, Appletreewick and elsewhere. The heaps of mining waste remain, contaminated with lead, and on which little will grow. The few plants that will are known as 'lead plants' such as spring sandwort and alpine penny-cress.

Tourism is important to the rural economy of Wharfedale and there are many short, mid and long-distance walks, with clear waymarkers. Other outdoor activities take place such as rock climbing, most notably at Kilnsey Crag, kayaking and canoeing. Other activities include cycling, mountain biking, horse riding and caving. Several long-distance walks pass near or over the river:

- Dales Way (follows the river valley from Beckermonds to Ilkley)
- Lady Anne's Way (enters the valley near Hubberholme and leaves to the west of Bolton Abbey)
- Inn Way to the Yorkshire Dales (part of walk from Grassington to Buckden)
- The Way of the Roses (part of the cycle route from Appletreewick to Thorpe)

The Wharfe has two hydro-electric generating plants; Burley (at Greenholme Mill in Burley in Wharfedale), which opened in August 2011 and Linton Falls, which opened in March 2012.

== Lists ==
All lists are ordered downstream from the source of the river:-

=== Tributaries ===
- Deepdale Gill
- Hagg Gill
- Bowther Gill
- Strans Gill
- Kirk Gill
- Cow Close Gill
- Buckden Beck
- Step Gill
- Cam Gill Beck
- Falcon Beard Beck
- Hush Gutter
- Kettlewell Beck
- Black Keld
- River Skirfare
- How Beck
- White Beck
- Davy Keld
- Dib Beck
- Robin Hood's Beck
- Captain Beck
- Brow Well
- Isingdale Beck
- Howling Beck
- Hebden Beck
- Sandbed Beck
- Barden Beck
- The Old Gutter
- Hall Wells Dike
- Foul Sike
- Fir Beck
- Bumby Dike
- Gill Beck
- Hollin Beck
- Posforth Gill
- Cowpert Gill
- Stead Dike
- Pickles Beck
- Raven's Gill Beck
- Kex Beck
- Lathehouse Beck
- Wine Beck
- West Hall Beck
- Dean Beck
- Mill Stream
- West Beck
- Mill Dam Beck
- Boot's Beck
- River Washburn
- Weeton Beck
- Stank Beck
- Collingham Beck
- Hay Dike
- Cock Beck
- Owl Sike
- Pailbank Drain
- The Fleet

=== Settlements ===
- Beckermonds
- Deepdale
- Yockenthwaite
- Hubberholme
- Buckden
- Starbotton
- Kettlewell
- Kilnsey
- Conistone
- Threshfield
- Grassington
- Linton
- Hebden
- Burnsall
- Hartlington
- Appletreewick
- Bolton Abbey
- Beamsley
- Addingham
- Nesfield
- Ilkley
- Burley in Wharfedale
- Otley
- Pool
- Castley
- Netherby
- Chapel Hill
- Collingham
- Linton
- Wetherby
- Boston Spa
- Thorp Arch
- Newton Kyme
- Tadcaster
- Kirkby Wharfe
- Ulleskelf
- Ozendyke
- Ryther

=== Crossings ===
- New House Farm footbridge
- Deepdale Bridge
- Yockenthwaite Bridge
- Hubberholme Bridge
- Buckden Bridge
- Starbotton footbridge
- B6160 Kettlewell New Bridge
- Conistone Bridge
- B6265 Grassington Bridge
- Tin Bridge (footbridge), Linton Falls
- Linton stepping stones
- Suspension Bridge (footbridge), Hebden
- Hebden stepping stones
- Burnsall Bridge
- Drebley stepping stones
- Barden Bridge
- Barden Aqueduct and footbridge
- Wooden Bridge (at Cavendish Pavilion)
- Friars' Steps (stepping stones)
- Waterfall Bridge (footbridge)
- Bolton Bridge
- A59 Bridge
- Suspension Bridge (footbridge), Addingham
- Old Bridge, Ilkley (footbridge)
- New Bridge, Ilkley (New Brook Street)
- Ilkley Suspension Bridge (footbridge)
- Ilkey-Denton Road stepping stones
- Denton Bridge
- Greenholme stepping stones
- B6451 Otley Bridge
- The White Bridge (footbridge)
- A658 Pool Bridge
- Arthington Viaduct (Leeds-Harrogate railway line)
- A61 Harewood Bridge
- Woodhall Bridge (footbridge)
- Linton Bridge, between Collingham and Linton
- The Ings Footbridge
- A661 Wetherby Bridge
- A58 bridge, Wetherby
- A1(M) bridge, Wetherby
- Thorp Arch Bridge, Boston Spa
- Wharfe Bridge - Newton Kyme Viaduct (railway, disused)
- Tadcaster Viaduct (railway, disused)
- A659 Tadcaster Bridge (bridge reopened 3 February 2017)
- A64 bridge (Tadcaster By-pass)
- Railway Bridge (Dearne Valley Line)
- East Coast Main Line Railway Bridge

== Gallery ==
Along the River Wharfe
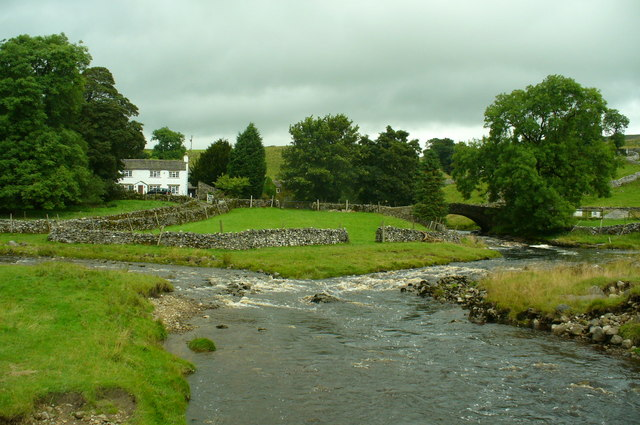
Oughtershaw Beck and Green Field Beck in Langstrothdale near Beckermonds become the River Wharfe
54°13′0.6″N 2°11′39.34″W

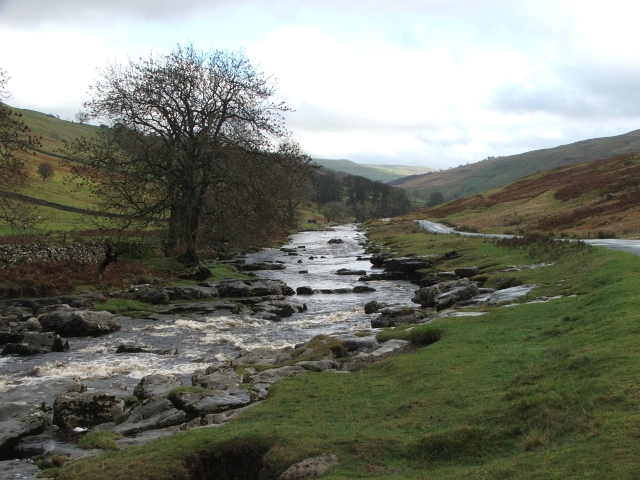
River Wharfe in Langstrothdale
54°12′33.62″N 2°9′22.87″W

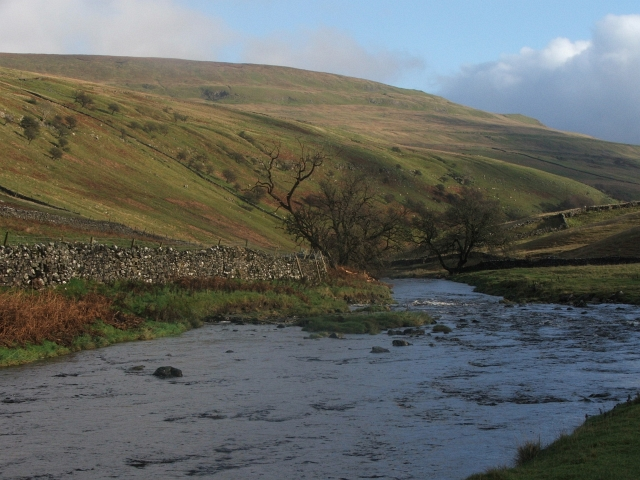
River Wharfe, Langstrothdale, east from the Dales Way Long Distance Walk
54°12′59.34″N 2°11′13.38″W

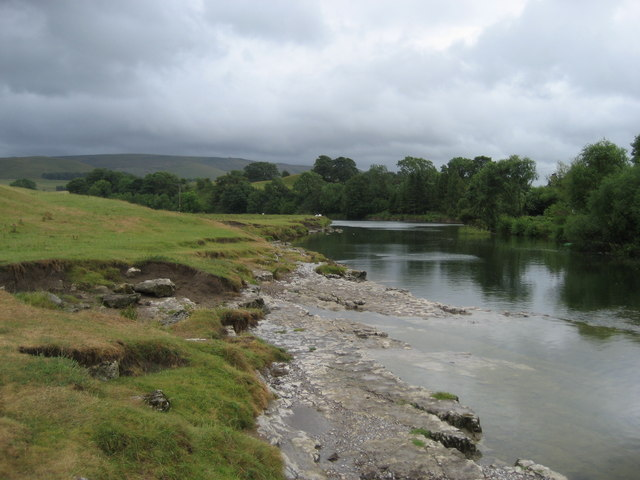
River Wharfe below Grassington Bridge
54°4′6.01″N 2°0′16.38″W

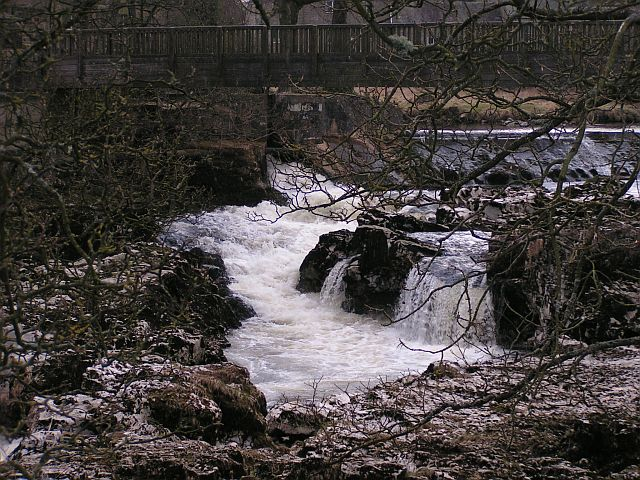
Linton Falls near Grassington

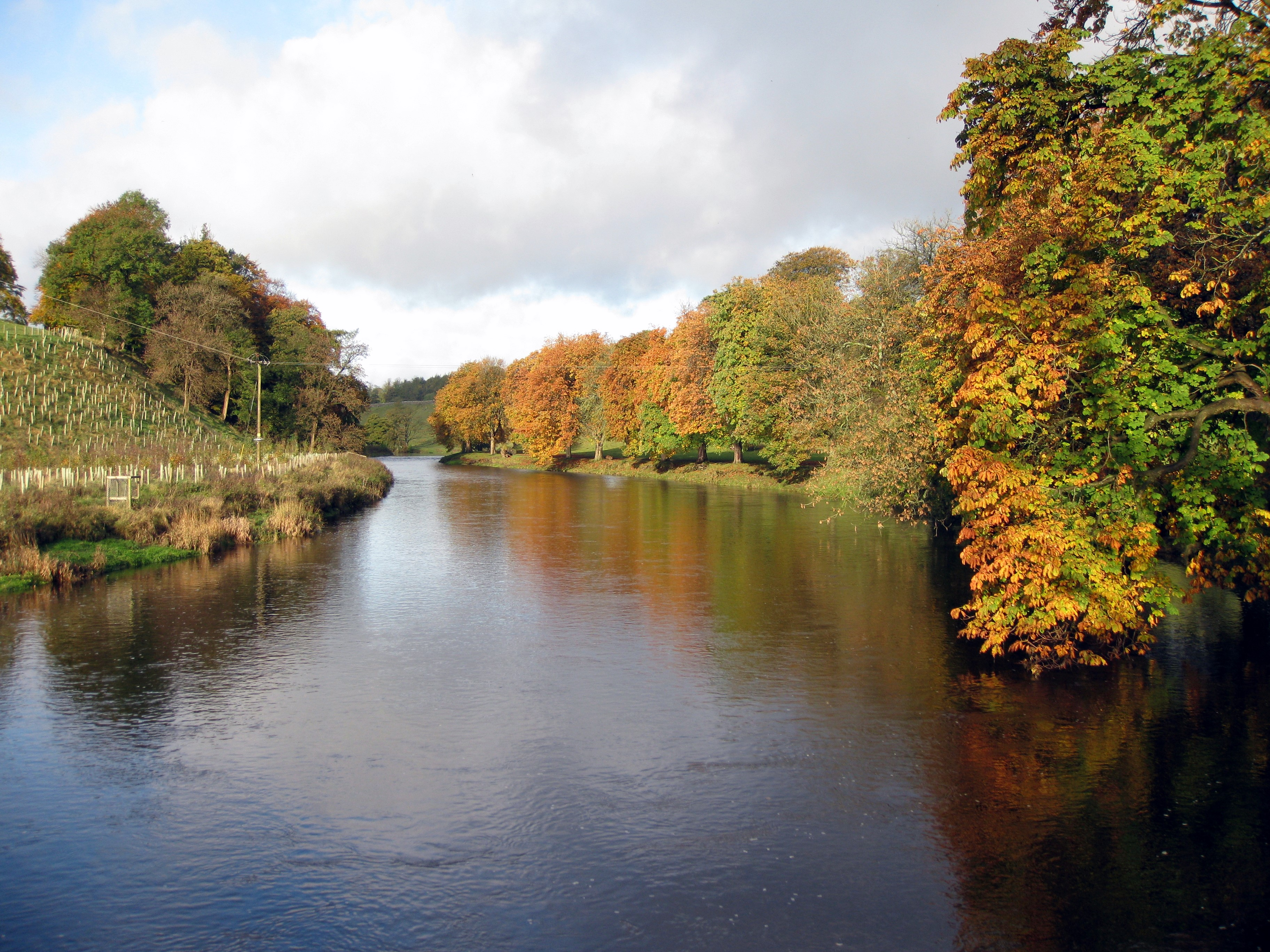
River Wharfe Upstream of Hebden suspension bridge

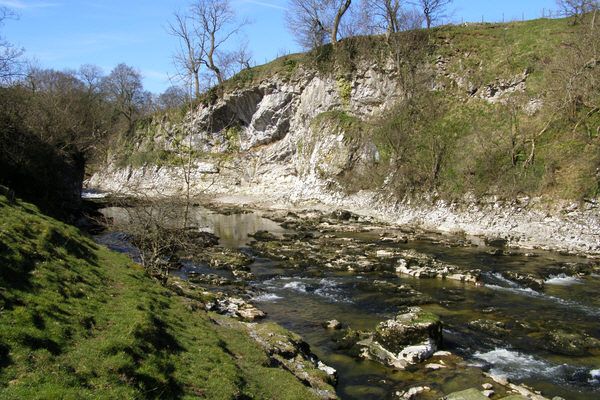
River Wharfe at Loup Scar Gorge
54°3′3.21″N 1°57′5.02″W

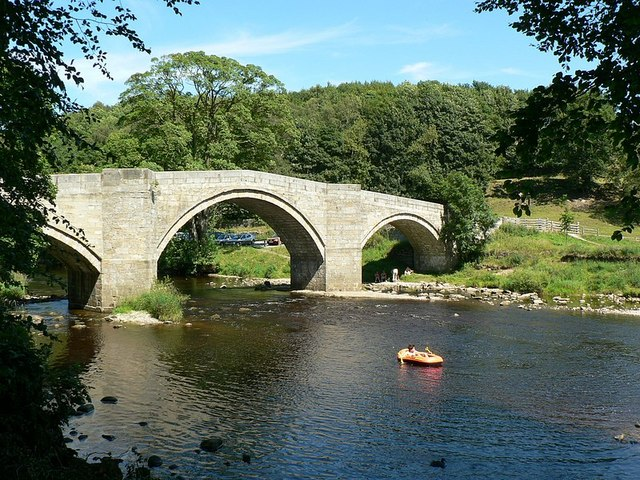
Barden Bridge, River Wharfe
54°0′45.32″N 1°55′19.15″W

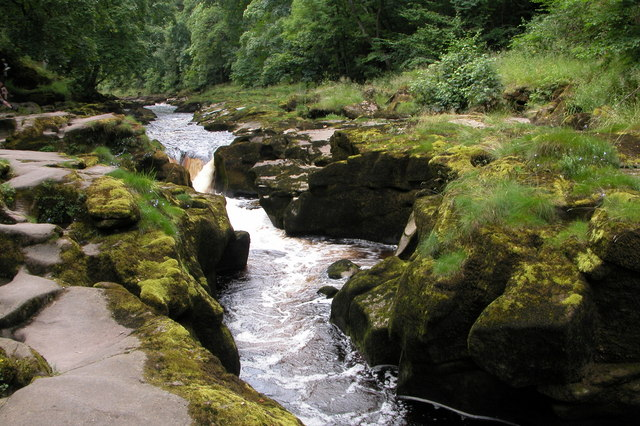
The Strid near Bolton Abbey
54°0′15.18″N 1°54′13.3″W

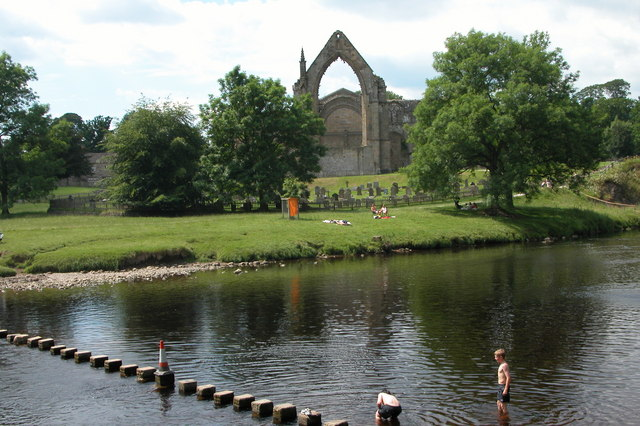
Bolton Abbey and the River Wharfe
53°59′0.39″N 1°53′12.53″W

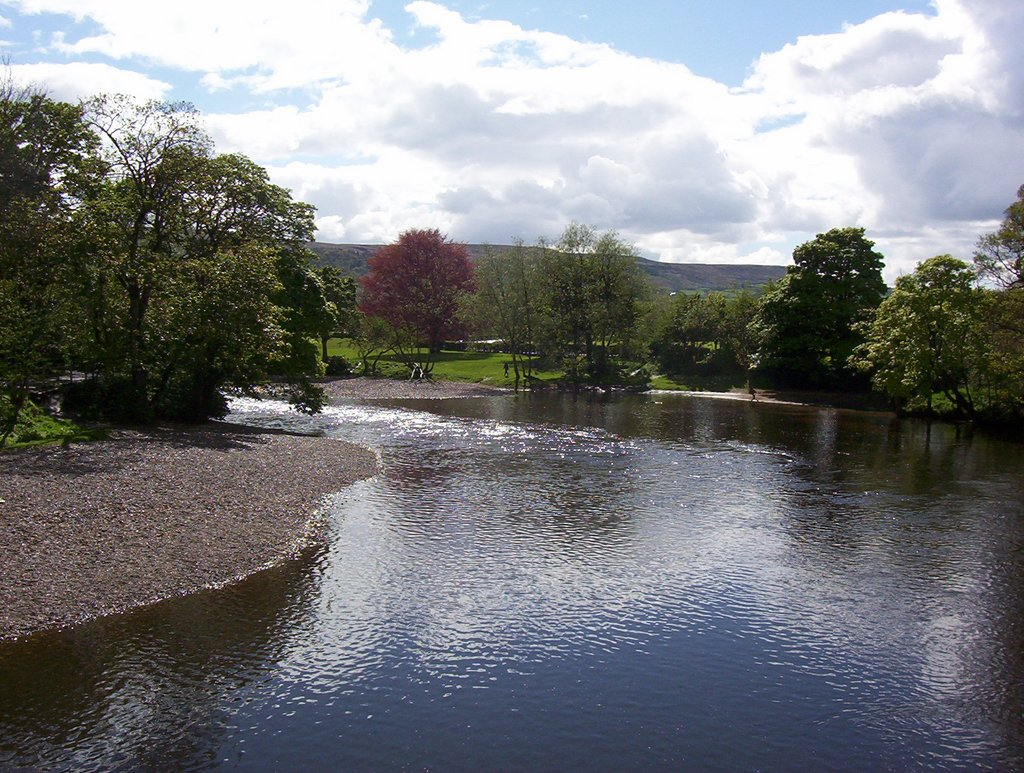
River Wharfe, Ilkley from footbridge
53°55′56.94″N 1°48′56.43″W

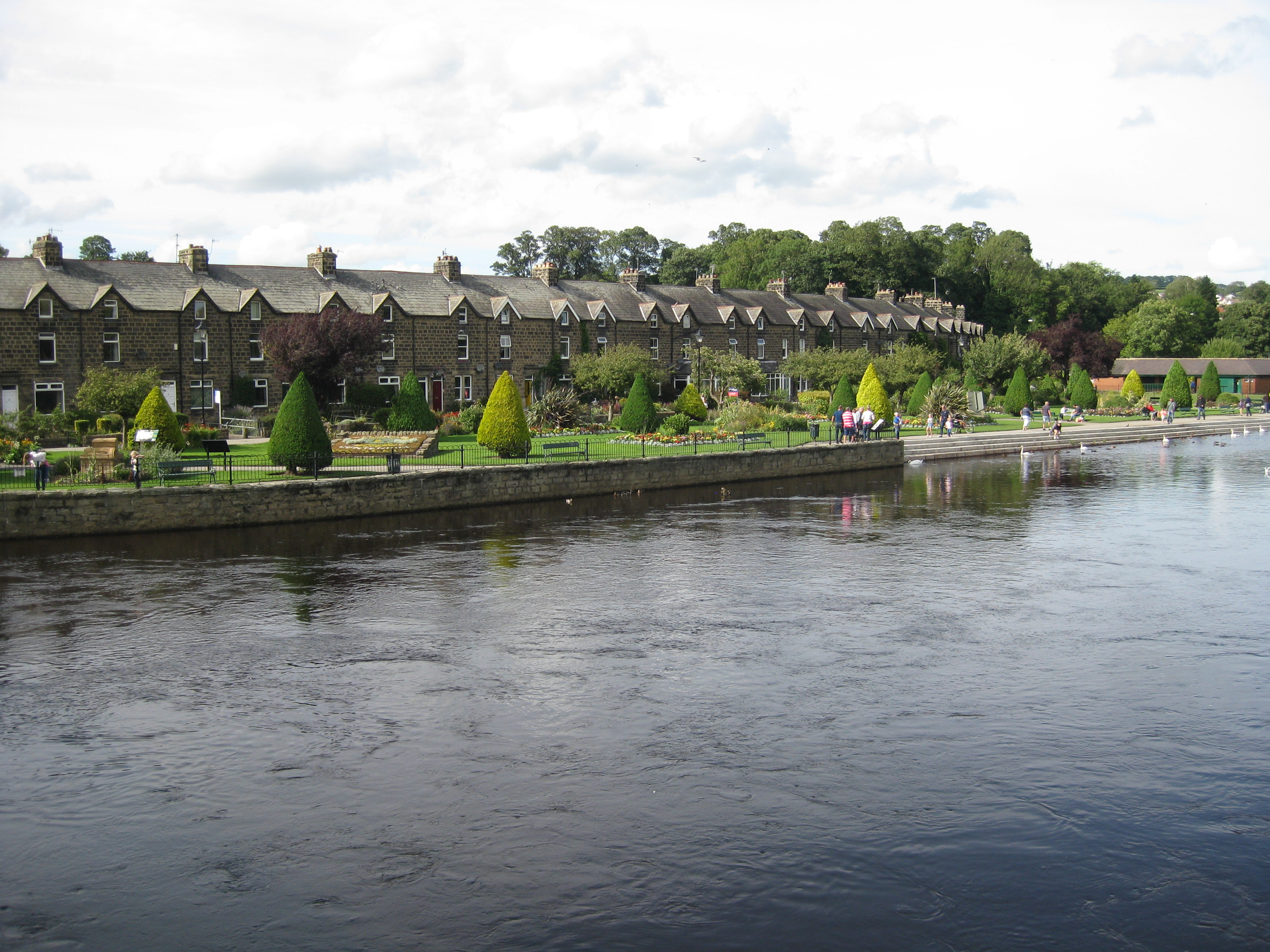
River Wharfe at Otley

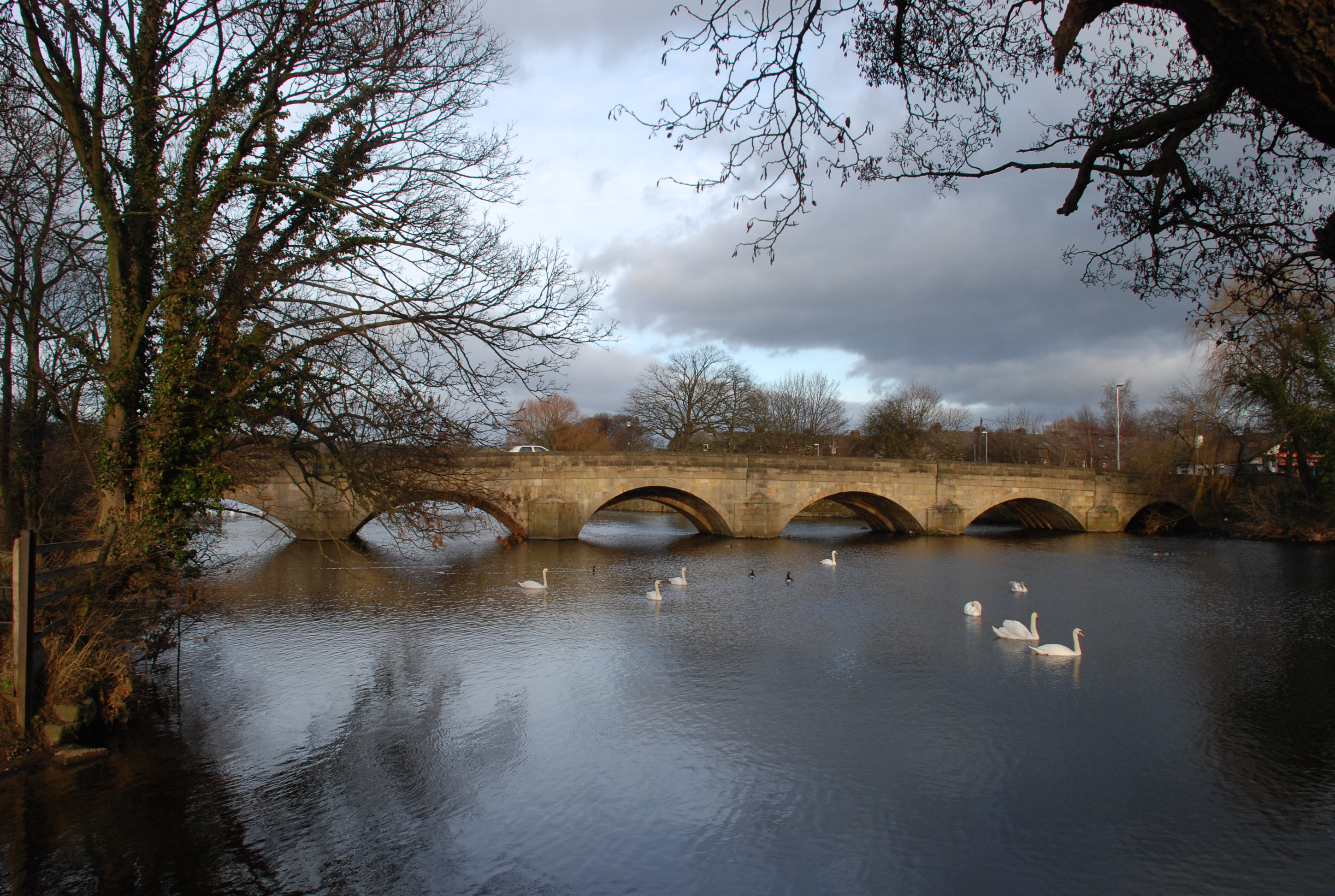
Bridge over River Wharfe at Otley

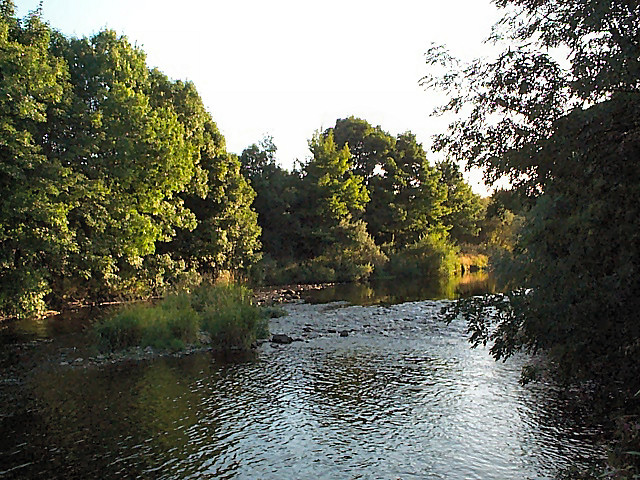
River Wharfe east of Otley looking upstream
53°54′38.72″N 1°40′37.97″W

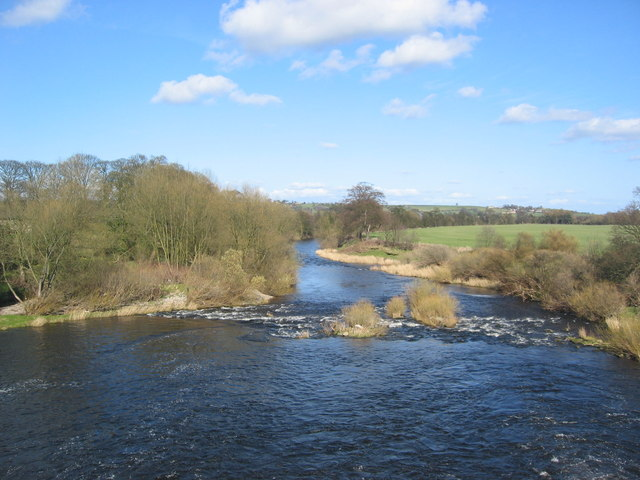
River Wharfe east from Harewood Bridge
53°54′49.31″N 1°31′18.97″W

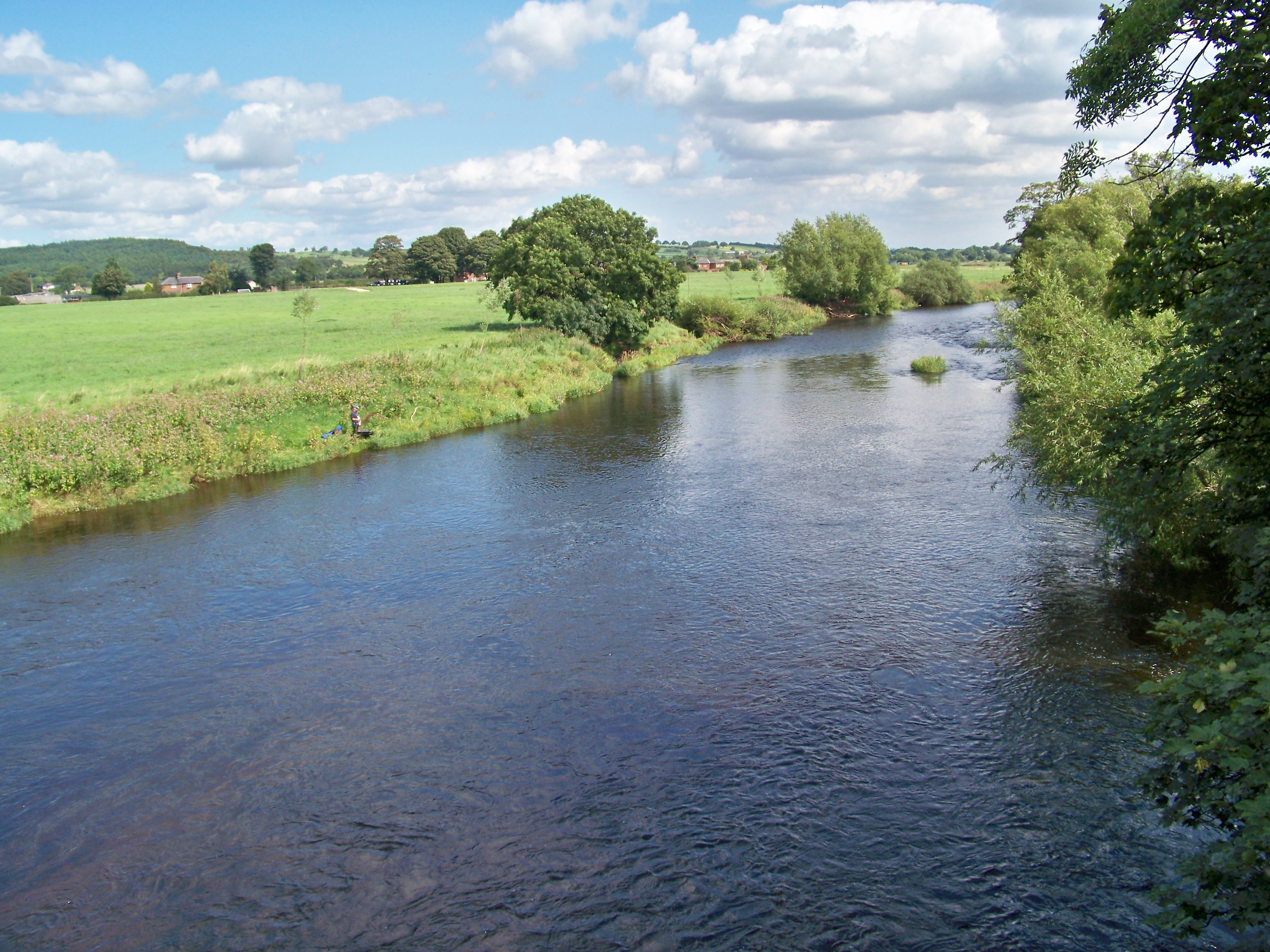
River Wharfe at Pool-in-Wharfedale east from A658 bridge

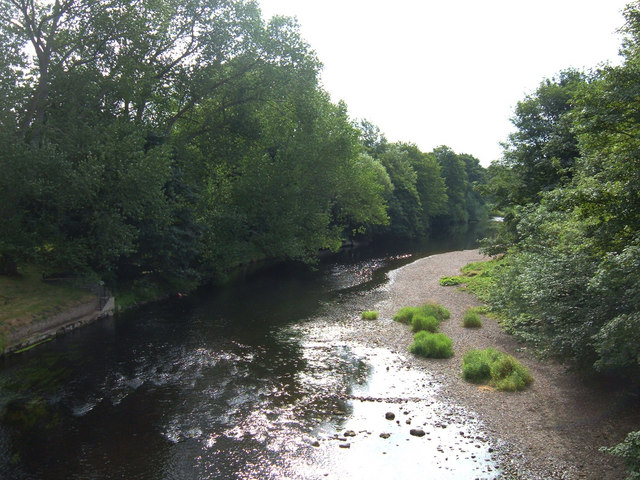
River Wharfe from Linton Bridge
53°54′47.53″N 1°24′38.92″W

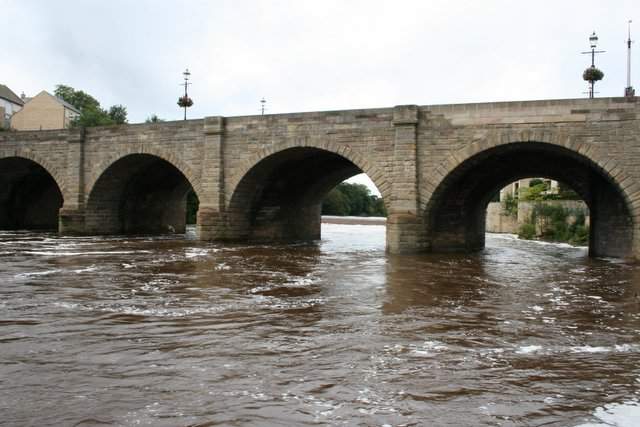
River Wharfe, Wetherby
53°55′35.68″N 1°23′21.48″W

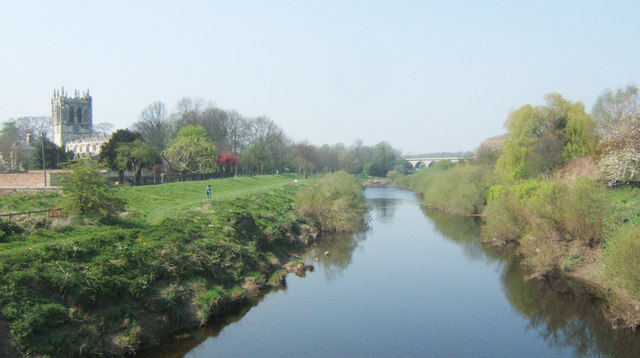
River Wharfe at Tadcaster with St Mary the Virgin Church in background
53°53′4.24″N 1°15′38.16″W

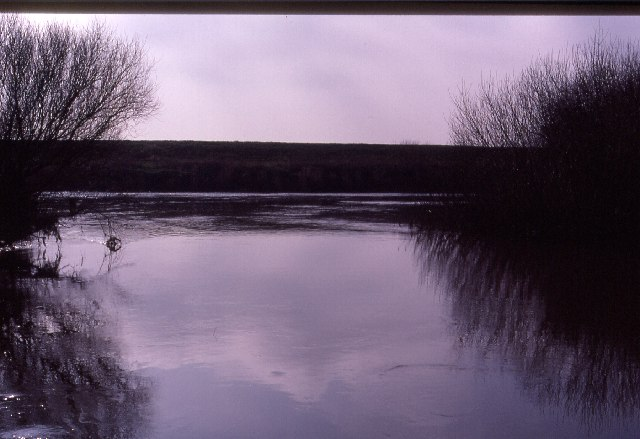
Wharfe's Mouth south of Cawood
53°50′38.73″N 1°7′50.17″W
