= List of Sites of Special Scientific Interest in North Yorkshire =

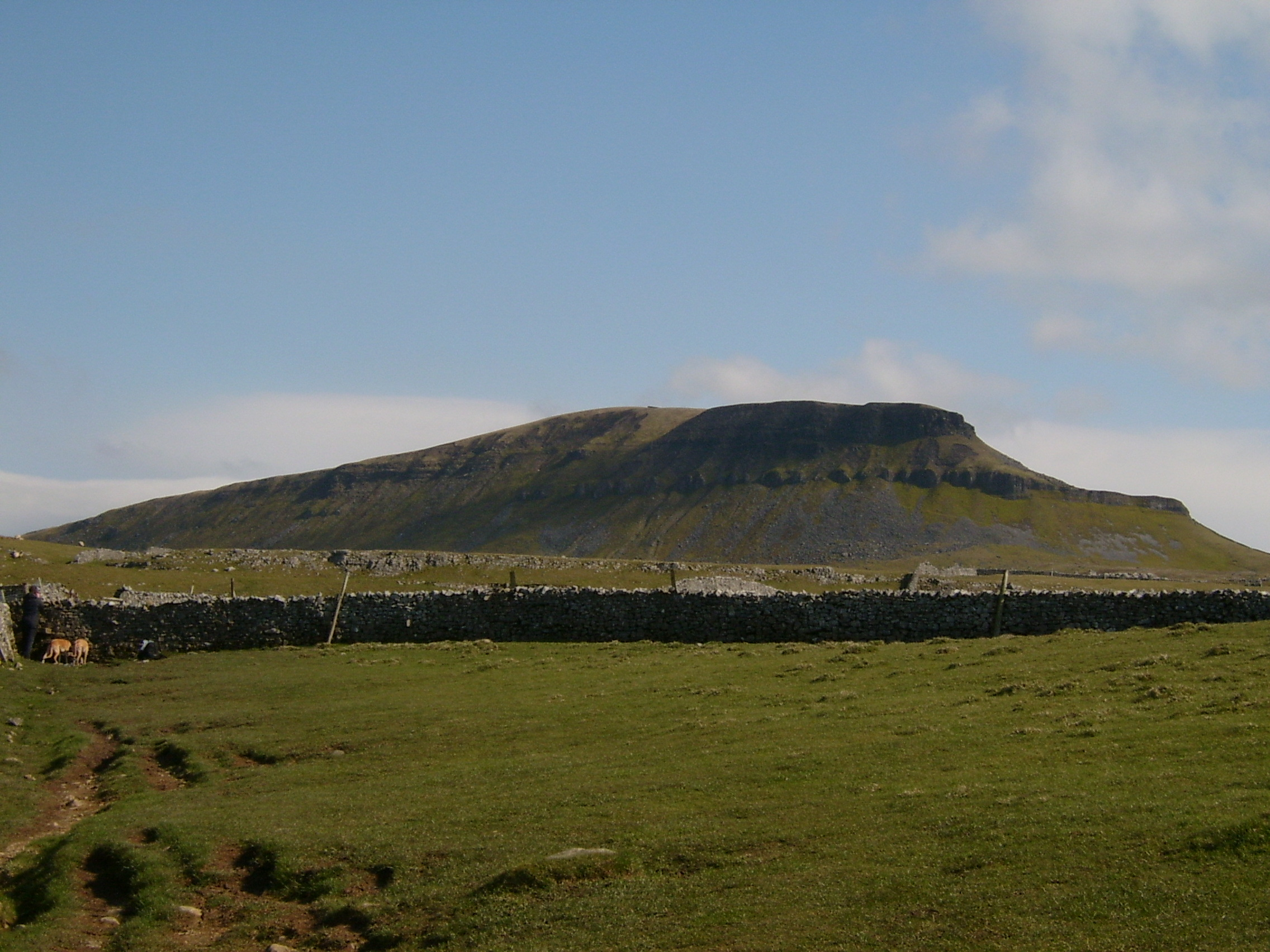
Pen-y-ghent in North Yorkshire

This is a list of the Sites of Special Scientific Interest (SSSIs) in North Yorkshire, United Kingdom. In England the body responsible for designating SSSIs is Natural England, which chooses a site because of its fauna, flora, geological or physiographical features. As of 2006, there are 241 sites designated within this Area of Search. 162 sites have been designated due to their biological interest, 56 due to their geological interest, and 23 for both.

Natural England took over the role of designating and managing SSSIs from English Nature in October 2006 when it was formed from the amalgamation of English Nature, parts of the Countryside Agency and the Rural Development Service. Natural England, like its predecessor, uses the 1974–1996 county system and as such the same approach is followed here, rather than, for example, merging all Yorkshire sites into a single list. Some sites you may expect to find here could therefore be in the Cleveland list.

For other counties, see List of SSSIs by Area of Search. The data in the table is taken from Natural England's website in the form of citation sheets for each SSSI.

== Sites ==
Site name	Reason for designation		Area^{[A]}		Grid reference^{[B]}	Year in which notified	Map^{[C]}	Citation^{[D]}
Site name	Biological interest	Geological interest	Hectares	Acres	Grid reference^{[B]}	Year in which notified	Map^{[C]}	Citation^{[D]}
Acaster South Ings	✓		38.3	94.6	SE594437	1988	Map	
Angram Bottoms	✓		9.8	24.2	NY891999	1989	Map	
Arkengarthdale Gunnerside and Reeth Moors	✓		7,634.7	18,865.4	NY935070 & SD970990	1998	Map	
Arkle Beck Meadows, Whaw	✓		8.4	20.8	NY984041	1986	Map	
Arnecliff and Park Hole Woods	✓		52.5	129.7	NZ787048	2000	Map	
Ashberry and Reins Wood	✓		97.7	241.5	SE565850	1960	Map	
Ashes Pasture and Meadows		✓	14.3	34.3	SD776785	1983	Map	
Askham Bog	✓	✓	44.7	110.7	SE570480	1961	Map	
Askrigg Bottoms	✓	✓	2.8	6.9	SD948903	1984	Map	
Attermire	✓		57.5	142.1	SD842637	1955	Map	
Aubert Ings	✓		10.6	26.3	SE453538	1984	Map	
Austwick and Lawkland Mosses	✓		83.6	206.6	SD762665	1958	Map	
Aysgarth		✓	18.3	45.1	SE008886 – SE021888	1992	Map	
Bastow Wood	✓		52.0	128.6	SD990657	1975	Map	
Beck Dale Meadow	✓		2.2	5.4	SE767659	2002	Map	
Beck Hole	✓		70.5	174.2	NZ825020	1960	Map	
Bellerby Fields	✓		2.8	6.9	SE114932	1994	Map	
Betton Farm Quarries		✓	2.3	5.6	TA002856	1954	Map	
Biller Howe Dale	✓		85.0	210.1	NZ918013	1983	Map	
Birkham Wood	✓		28.2	69.6	SE359551	1988	Map	
Birks Fell Caves		✓	85.5	211.2	SD935765	1989	Map	
Birkwith Caves and Fell	✓	✓	178.4	440.8	SD806766	1988	Map	
Bishop Monkton Ings	✓		38.8	95.9	SE344659	1986	Map	
Black Keld Catchment		✓	1401.3	3461.2	SE010700	1999	Map	
Black Scar Quarry		✓	1.1	2.8	NZ231052	1992	Map	
Blaiskey Bank Springs	✓		1.4	3.5	SE625887	1989	Map	
Bolton Percy Ings	✓		7.1	17.5	SE534401	1991	Map	
Boreham Cave		✓	159.4	393.9	SD926732	1986	Map	
Botton Head		✓	5.1	12.6	NZ596020	1984	Map	
Brants Gill Catchment		✓	493.2	1218.2	SD823733, SD825717 & SD850700	1986	Map	
Breighton Meadows	✓		37.4	90.6	SE704330	1986	Map	
Bride Stones	✓	✓	120.5	297.7	SE873910	1952	Map	
Brimham Rocks	✓		162.7	402.0	SE212647	1958	Map	
Brockadale	✓		58.3	144.0	SE503174	1961	Map	
Broughton Bank		✓	4.6	11.3	NZ568035	1981	Map	
Bull Ings	✓		3.0	7.5	SE753880	1983	Map	
Burr Closes, Selby	✓		1.3	3.1	SE596340	1984	Map	
Burton Leonard Lime Quarry	✓		3.3	8.2	SE323630	1958	Map	
Castle Hill Wood	✓		5.7	11.1	SE585831	1983	Map	
Castlebeck and Scar Woods	✓		36.6	90.5	SE947974	1954	Map	
Cawthorn Moor	✓		38.3	94.6	SE781923	1990	Map	
Caydale	✓		163.6	404.2	SE530870	2004	Map	
Cayton, Cornelian and South Bays	✓		169.8	419.5	TA600860	1984	Map	
Chris's Pasture	✓		3.8	9.4	SD964890	1991	Map	
Church Ings	✓		6.7	16.5	SD594456	1991	Map	
Cliff Beck Meadow, Buttertubs	✓		1.5	3.7	SD880967	1986	Map	
Cliff Force Cave		✓	70.9	175.4	SD875960	1998	Map	
Cliff Ridge		✓	2.6	6.4	NZ575116	1988	Map	
Clints Quarry		✓	1.0	2.5	SD967575	1955	Map	
Cockerham Meadows, Thorpe	✓		2.5	6.2	SD998616	1987	Map	
Cocket Moss	✓		20.0	50.0	SD787618	1955	Map	
Cockrah Wood	✓		11.9	29.4	SE970882	1950	Map	
Conistone Old Pasture	✓	✓	297.2	734.4	SD990670	1955	Map	
Cow Cliff Pasture and Quarry	✓		1.3	3.3	SE856669	1984	Map	
Cow Myers	✓		15.2	37.5	SE270730	1983	Map	
Cracoe Reef Knolls		✓	141.1	348.6	SD988603, SD996609, SE003608, SE007615, SE015614 & SE026618	1952	Map	
Cropton Banks and Howlgate Head Woods	✓		42.2	104.3	SE745875	1985	Map	
Dalby Bush Fen	✓		7.4	18.3	SE645715	1988	Map	
Deepdale Meadows, Langstrothdale	✓		12.8	31.6	SD889797	1988	Map	
Derwent Ings	✓		662.4	1,636.9	SE703466 – SE703347	1975	Map	
Dow Cave System		✓	79.4	196.2	SD989735	1987	Map	
Duncombe Park	✓		117.8	291.2	SE607828	1985	Map	
East Heslerton Brow	✓		40.7	100.6	SE926757	1954	Map	
East Keswick Fitts	✓		12.0	29.6	SE352460	1989	Map	
East Nidderdale Moors (Flamstone Pin - High Ruckles)	✓		10,776.9	26,619.1	SE112854 – SE177665	1996	Map	
Eller's Wood and Sand Dale	✓		8.9	21.9	SE856848	1983	Map	
Ellerburn Bank	✓		2.9	7.2	SE853848	1983	Map	
Eskamhorn Meadows	✓		13.7	33.8	SE679242	2010	Map	
Fairy Call Beck		✓	1.8	4.5	SE711903	1992	Map	
Far Mains and Far Limekiln Close Meadows	✓		2.1	5.1	SD992628	1986	Map	
Farndale	✓		157.3	388.8	SE670963	1987	Map	
Farnham Mires	✓		10.2	25.1	SE338605	1954	Map	
Feetham Holme	✓		3.2	7.8	SD994977	1984	Map	
Filey Brigg	✓		27.9	68.9	TA126816	1985	Map	
Foredale		✓	1.6	4.0	SD803700	1990	Map	
Forlorn Hope Meadow	✓		1.6	4.0	SE543171	1991	Map	
Fothering Holme	✓		10.3	25.5	NY991040	1989	Map	
Freeholders Wood	✓		14.0	34.6	SE013889	1988	Map	
Fulford Ings	✓		12.7	31.3	SE608491	1991	Map	
Giggleswick Scar and Kinsey Cave	✓	✓	40.1	99.1	SD876665 – SD802657	1958	Map	
Gingerfields	✓		6.9	17.0	NZ162025 & NZ167022	1991	Map	
Golden Hill Pit		✓	0.7	1.7	SE724827	1990	Map	
Gormire	✓		54.0	133.5	SE505834	1954	Map	
Gouthwaite Reservoir	✓		147.7	365.0	SE129693	1969	Map	
Gowerdale Windy Pits/Peak Scar	✓	✓	4.7	11.6	SE518889, SE526885 & SE529883	1960	Map	
Grass Wood	✓		88.0	217.5	SD985655	1955	Map	
Grassington Hospital Grounds	✓		5.0	12.4	SE017635	1988	Map	
Great Almscliff Crag		✓	7.9	19.4	SE268490	1987	Map	
Green Lane Pit		✓	1.1	2.6	SE732837	1988	Map	
Greenfield Meadow	✓		15.1	37.3	SD833794	1985	Map	
Greenhow Pasture	✓		7.2	17.8	SE118640	1983	Map	
Greenhow Quarry		✓	2.7	6.6	SE113639	1992	Map	
Gristhorpe Bay and Red Cliff	✓		54.4	134.4	TA085840	1954	Map	
Hack Fall Wood	✓		42.4	104.7	SE235772	1989	Map	
Hackness Head Quarry		✓	3.0	7.4	SE965904	1954	Map	
Hackness Rock Pit		✓	0.1	0.3	SE965907	1992	Map	
Hambleton Quarry		✓	12.3	30.3	SE058533	1991	Map	
Harker's House Meadows	✓		14.2	35.1	NY860019	1985	Map	
Harwood Dale Moor		✓	0.4	1.1	SE961991	1999	Map	
Haugh and Gundale Slacks	✓		58.7	145.0	SE797886, SE800880, SE807882, SE804871 & SE802863	1985	Map	
Haw Crag Quarry		✓	9.0	23.3	SD913564	1958	Map	
Hawkswick Wood	✓		12.0	29.0	SD946714	1975	Map	
Hay-a-Park Gravel Pit	✓		44.9	111.0	SE362581	1995	Map	
Hayburn Wyke	✓	✓	21.0	51.9	TA012968	1958	Map	
Hesley Moss	✓		10.9	27.1	SD783602	1993	Map	
Heslington Tillmire	✓		46.7	115.3	SE638475	1990	Map	
Hill House Nab		✓	4.0	9.9	SE659993	1984	Map	
Hole of Horcum	✓	✓	145.2	358.8	SE845935	1954	Map	
Holy Well, Bridge		✓	1.7	4.2	SE028533	1986	Map	
Horse Field, Gilling	✓		2.1	5.2	SE626758	1985	Map	
Ingleborough	✓	✓	5,230.0	12,923.4	SD760740	1955	Map	
Iron Scar and Hundale Point to Scalby Ness	✓	✓	125.3	309.6	TA017964, TA021957 – TA036908	1984	Map	
Jeffry Bog	✓		7.6	18.8	SE760667 & SE761664	1983	Map	
Keasden Moor		✓	10.2	25.2	SD725664	1989	Map	
Kettlewell Meadows	✓		12.3	30.3	SD960734	1986	Map	
Kildale Hall		✓	6.6	16.2	NZ609096	1993	Map	
Kilnsey Flush	✓		1.5	3.7	SD972675	1986	Map	
Kirk Deighton	✓		4.0	9.9	SE398501	2000	Map	
Kirkby Wharfe	✓		21.7	53.7	SE510400	1984	Map	
Kirkdale Cave		✓	0.3	0.7	SE678856	1960	Map	
Kirkham Park & Riverside	✓		41.1	101.5	SE737667	1954	Map	
Kisdon Force Woods	✓		38.0	94.0	NY900009	1974	Map	
Ladyhills	✓		3.5	8.8	SE912723	1993	Map	
Langcliffe Scars and Jubilee, Albert and Victoria Caves		✓	684.9	1692.4	SD845642	1955	Map	
Len Pastures, Crackpot	✓		4.0	9.9	SD975968	1989	Map	
Leyburn Glebe	✓		2.6	6.5	SE101896	1983	Map	
Ling Gill	✓		5.1	12.6	SD801785	1985	Map	
Littlebeck Wood	✓		17.3	42.8	NZ881045	1983	Map	
Lord's Wood and Pasture	✓		6.4	15.8	SD813647	1990	Map	
Lovely Seat - Stainton Moor	✓		10,128.7	25,017.8	SD863933 – SE114946	1995	Map	
Low Gill Moor Wetlands	✓		62.9	155.4	SD962874	1990	Map	
Low Pasture	✓		10.5	25.9	SE539893	1987	Map	
Lower Swaledale Woods and Grasslands	✓		223.7	552.7	NZ120014	1992	Map	
Malham-Arncliffe	✓	✓	4,933.9	12,191.7	SD920676	1955	Map	
Malham-Arncliffe (Cool Pasture)	✓		6.2	15.2	SD967677	1995	Map	
Mallerstang-Swaledale Head	✓		6,232.3	15,400.0	NY840000	1964	Map	
Mar Field Fen	✓		8.9	22.0	SE223819	1988	Map	
Marsett Rigg	✓		8.0	19.8	SD900860	1985	Map	
Meadow Croft, Skythorns	✓		0.4	0.9	SD979639	1985	Map	
Meal Bank Quarry		✓	7.2	17.7	SD698735	1958	Map	
Mill Holme Meadow, Thwaite	✓		0.6	1.5	SD897980	1986	Map	
Mount Pleasant Quarry		✓	1.0	2.5	SE734670	1954	Map	
Muker Meadows	✓		15.6	38.5	SD914978	1988	Map	
Nabgate	✓		6.7	16.5	SE866847	1987	Map	
Naburn Marsh	✓		13.3	32.9	SE600479	1992	Map	
New Close, Calvert Houses	✓		6.6	19.3	SD920987	1986	Map	
New House Meadows, Malham	✓		8.8	21.7	SD933643	1990	Map	
Newbridge Quarry		✓	7.1	17.5	SE797861	1984	Map	
Newby Moor	✓		276.8	684.0	SD717692	1990	Map	
Newsome Bridge Quarry		✓	1.6	4.0	SE379511	1970	Map	
Newton-le-willows Meadows	✓		4.2	10.5	SE212893 & SE215892	1994	Map	
Newtondale	✓	✓	935.5	2,311.1	SE820915	1955	Map	
Nine Spring Dale	✓		4.5	11.2	SE868693	1959	Map	
Noddle End	✓		9.5	23.5	SE528888	1987	Map	
North Bay to South Toll House Cliff		✓	10.4	25.1	TA048893, TA051894, TA046892 & TA048892	1954	Map	
North York Moors	✓	✓	44,087.7	108,940.6	SE4996 – SE7192 & NZ9500 – NZ6910	1998	Map	
Nunnington Cutting and Quarries		✓	5.6	13.8	SE646785 & SE648787	1984	Map	
Oughtershaw and Beckermonds	✓		75.9	187.6	SD870810	1985	Map	
Ox Close	✓		140.1	346.2	SD982908 – SD992899	1985	Map	
Oxenber and Wharfe Woods	✓		88.4	218.3	SD785685	1955	Map	
Pan Beck Fen	✓		2.5	6.1	SD848559	1985	Map	
Park Hall Meadows, Healaugh, Richmondshire	✓		6.8	16.8	SE017989	1985	Map	
Pen Y Ghent Gill	✓	✓	215.6	532.7	SD870740	1986	Map	
Pen-y-ghent	✓	✓	1,456.9	3,600.0	SD850740	1955	Map	
Pikedaw Calamine Caverns	✓	✓	27.1	66.9	SD875640	1958	Map	
Pilmoor	✓		45.0	111.2	SE460730	1992	Map	
Pry and Bottom Meadows, Mid-mossdale	✓		3.6	8.8	SD833917 – SD837919	1984	Map	
Quarry Moor	✓		7.5	18.8	SE309693	1986	Map	
Raincliffe & Forge Valley Woods	✓		95.6	236.2	SE986870	1956	Map	
Richmond Meadows	✓		2.9	7.1	NZ169000 & NZ176007	1995	Map	
Rievaulx Woods	✓		17.0	42.0	SE578847	1954	Map	
Ripon Parks	✓		130.0	321.0	SE310750	1983	Map	
River Derwent	✓		-	-	SE678287 – SE825757	1986	Map	
River Ribble (Long Preston Deeps)	✓		168.8	417.2	SD809621 – SD827570	1987	Map	
River Ure Bank, Ripon Parks		✓	1.9	4.6	SE310750 – SE307757	1988	Map	
River Ure Grasslands	✓		18.5	45.8	SE147870 – SE157862, SE017889 & SD985856	1986	Map	
River Wharfe	✓		48.3	119.4	SD940773 – SD973711	1985	Map	
Robin Hood's Bay: Maw Wyke to Beast Cliff	✓	✓	365.2	902.4	NZ941082 – TA005987	1954–-74	Map	
Runswick Bay		✓	9.9	24.4	NZ809169	1984	Map	
Ruston Cottage Pasture	✓		17.1	42.3	SE956835	1984	Map	
Ryedale Windypits		✓	11.2	27.7	SE576836, SE582829 & SE588828	1960	Map	
Salt Lake Quarry	✓		3.6	8.9	SD773785	1975	Map	
Scar Closes, Kisdon Side	✓		3.7	9.1	NY893000	1988	Map	
Scar End Wood	✓		27.4	67.7	SE785990	1983	Map	
School Share Section		✓	2.4	6.0	SD845623	1952	Map	
Scoska Wood	✓		68.9	170.3	SD915725	1975	Map	
Seato Pastures	✓	✓	9.9	24.5	SD729761	1990	Map	
Seive Dale Fen	✓		10.4	26.7	SE855877	1983	Map	
Semerwater	✓		101.4	250.6	SD913865	1975	Map	
Shaw Beck Gill		✓	29.1	77.9	NZ000037 – NZ011059	1977	Map	
Shaw's Gate Quarry		✓	1.6	3.9	SE524823	1984	Map	
Sherburn Willows	✓		5.3	13.1	SE487325	1985	Map	
Sked Dale	✓		3.6	8.9	SE969751	1954	Map	
Skipwith Common	✓		293.0	724.0	SE655373	1958	Map	
Sleightholme Dale	✓		28.7	71.0	SE666885	1986	Map	
Snape Hill Quarry		✓	0.6	1.5	SE509787	1984	Map	
Snaper Farm Meadows	✓		15.9	39.3	SE597912	1990	Map	
South Pennine Moors	✓	✓	20,938	51,738.7	SD920300	1994	Map	
Spell Howe Plantation	✓		4.3	10.6	TA064790	1986	Map	
Spiker's Hill Quarry		✓	6.4	15.8	SE980862	1991	Map	
Spring Wood, Hawnby	✓		42.4	104.7	SE524896	1984	Map	
Staithes - Port Mulgrave		✓	62.3	154.1	NZ784189 – NZ797175	1984	Map	
Stephen Ings, Crackpot	✓		3,089	7,630	SD976965	1986	Map	
Stonehead Beck (Gill Beck)		✓	0.6	1.4	SD947432	1986	Map	
Stonepit and Nova Slacks	✓		12.2	30.1	SE883652	1986	Map	
Stran's Gill		✓	7.8	19.3	SD916786	1990	Map	
Strensall Common	✓		578.7	1,430.1	SE650600	1965	Map	
Strid Wood	✓		58.9	145.6	SE070560	1985	Map	
Stump Cross Caves		✓	55.8	137.9	SE092635	1989	Map	
Stutton Ings	✓		5.1	12.7	SE485405	1986	Map	
Swale Lakes	✓		42.5	105.0	SE248985	1986	Map	
Swarth Moor	✓		34.1	85.2	SD806695	1958	Map	
Swinden Quarry	✓	✓	112.1	276.9	SD980616	1998	Map	
Swineley Meadow, Widdale	✓		8.8	21.7	SD802859	1984	Map	
Tadcaster Mere		✓	8.7	21.5	SE500430	1987	Map	
The Ings, Amotherby	✓		18.0	44.6	SE759752	1994	Map	
Thixen Dale and Longdale	✓		89.7	221.5	SE831600, SE843606 & SE845593	1954	Map	
Thornton and Twisleton Glens	✓		59.6	147.2	SD695745 & SD705745	1958	Map	
Thowker Corner	✓		1.4	3.5	SE081904	1990	Map	
Three Dykes	✓		0.6	1.4	SE804683	1962	Map	
Thwaite Stones	✓		17.6	43.5	SD895989	1984	Map	
Tranmire	✓		11.0	27.2	NZ770120	1985	Map	
Tripsdale	✓		1,013	2,503	SE585995	1965	Map	
Troutsdale and Rosekirk Dale Fens	✓		13.1	32.3	SE900876 & SE903879	1984	Map	
Upper Dunsforth Carrs	✓		10.2	25.1	SE442628	1984	Map	
Upper Nidderdale		✓	137.2	347.2	SE102755	1961	Map	
Upper Wharfedale	✓	✓	1,123.0	2,773.9	SD965735	1994	Map	
Vessey Pasture Dale and Back Dale	✓		26.8	66.2	SE832622	1985	Map	
Walden Meadows	✓		12.0	29.7	SE005823	1986	Map	
Wanlass Grasslands	✓		67.1	165.8	SE065893 & SE054898	1986	Map	
Waterdale	✓		36.3	90.0	SE820617	1954	Map	
Wath Quarry		✓	0.1	0.3	SE673750	1991	Map	
West End Meadow, Lunds	✓		3.7	9.1	SD792295	1986	Map	
West Nidderdale, Barden and Blubberhouses Moors	✓		13,418.9	33,144.8	SE080705 – SD985580 – SE170510	1998	Map	
Wharram Quarry	✓		6.4	16.0	SE860653	1984	Map	
Whernside	✓	✓	3,839.4	9,487.1	SD735802	1958	Map	
Whitby-Saltwick		✓	42.4	104.7	NZ901115 – NZ916109	1985	Map	
Whitcliffe Section, Quarry Moor		✓	0.1	0.2	SE307692	1998	Map	
Whitfield Gill and Mill Gill		✓	18.7	46.2	SD920932 – SD908945	1998	Map	
Wintringham Marsh	✓		5.7	14.0	SD875734	1975	Map	
Yockenthwaite Meadows	✓		11.2	27.7	SD912786	1986	Map	

== Notes ==
^{A} Data rounded to one decimal place.
^{B} Grid reference is based on the British national grid reference system, also known as OSGB36, and is the system used by the Ordnance Survey.
^{C} Link to maps using the Nature on the Map service provided by English Nature.
^{D} English Nature citation sheets for each SSSI. Retrieved 8 May 2011.
