= Marsett Rigg =

Protected area of North Yorkshire

Coordinates: 54.269555°N 2.1550466°W

Marsett Rigg is an area of rough pasture that has been designated as a Site of Special Scientific Interest (SSSI) because of the diversity of plant species present. It is located within Yorkshire Dales National Park. Its northern border follows the stream called Bardale Beck and its eastern border abuts the hamlet of Marsett. Management is through a traditional grazing regime.

This site contains both neutral grassland and more acidic grassland. In neutral grassland, plant species include betony, water avens, primrose, globe flower, wood anemone and wood buttercup. Orchid species in this protected area include twayblade, early purple orchid, fragrant orchid and northern marsh orchid. Near the banks of Bardale Beck, plant species include bird's-eye primrose, butterwort and marsh valerian. In the acidic grassland, there are patches of heather and bilberry with devil's-bit scabious.

Outside the protected area, within the hamlet of Marsett, a population of the plant called caraway has been recorded.
