= Caydale =

Protected area in North Yorkshire, England

Coordinates: 54.2750°N 1.1875°W

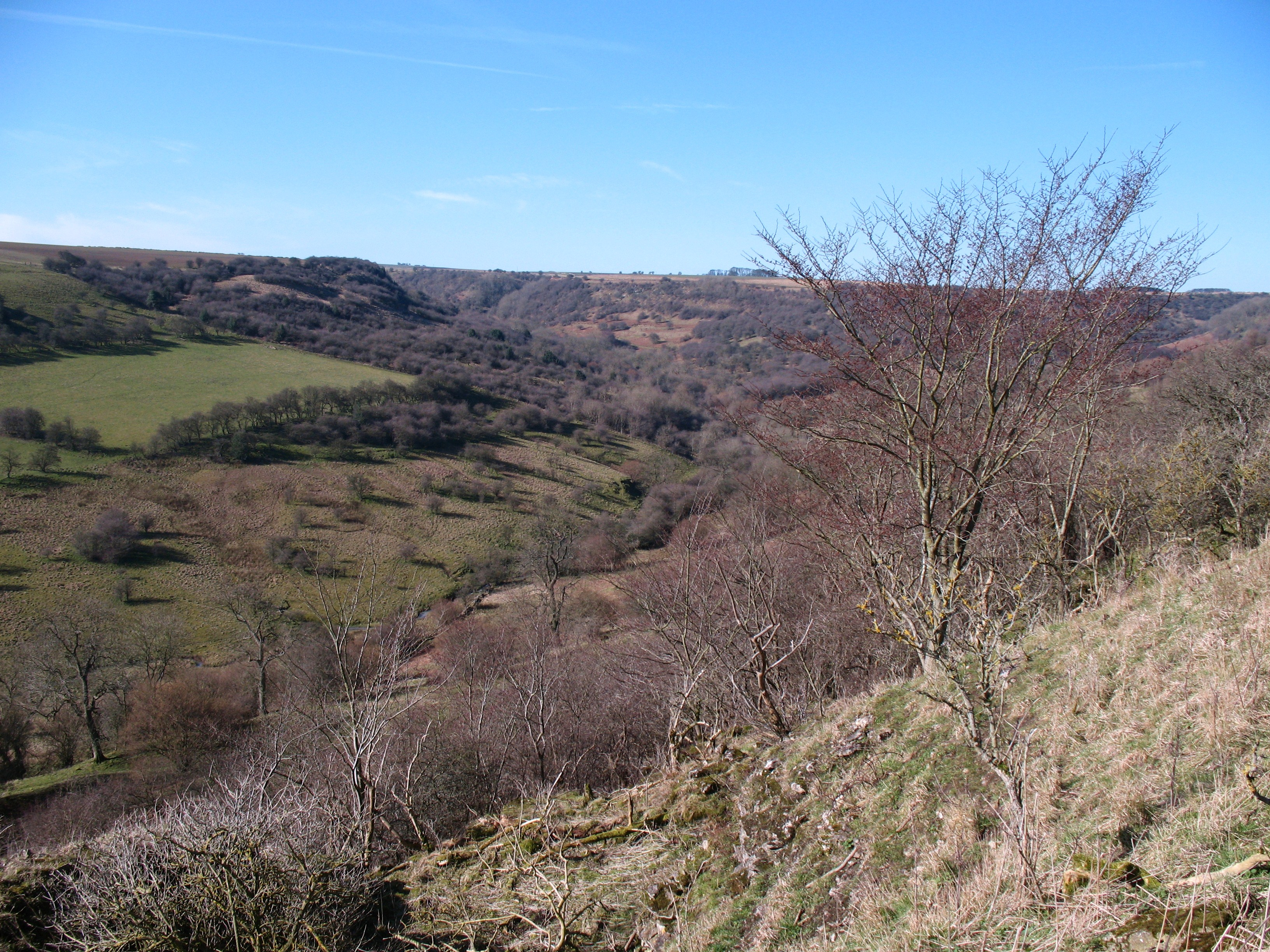
Caydale

Caydale is a Site of Special Scientific Interest (SSSI) within North York Moors National Park, in North Yorkshire, England. It is located 8 km northwest of the town of Helmsley, near the village of Old Byland, and includes the stream valleys around Caydale Mill. These streams feed into the River Rye. This valley system is protected because of the mosaic of habitats present that include grassland, peatland and heathland, and because of its populations of the butterfly called the Duke of Burgundy.

This protected area includes parts of Murton wood, Yowlass wood and Moor Ings bank. There are old quarries in this protected area that provide habitat for mining insects.

== Biology ==
Plants in the limestone grassland include wild thyme, wild strawberry, fairy flax, dropwort, bloody crane's-bill, saw-wort and mountain everlasting. The peatlands are located on the valley floors and here plant species include wild angelica , meadowsweet , devil's-bit scabious, water mint, grass of-parnassus and bogbean. In fen meadow, plant species include marsh valerian, marsh-marigold and orchid species including common twayblade, common spotted-orchid and fragrant orchid.

Insect species in this protected area include the butterfly called the Duke of Burgundy, and also the beetle species Oedemera virescens (genus Oedemera), Malthodes fibulatus (genus Malthodes), Pyrochroa coccinea and Ischnomera sanguinicollis (genus Ischnomera). The cranefly Rhipidia uniseriata (genus Rhipidia) has also been recorded in this protected area.

== Geology ==
The rocks underlying Caydale are Corallian limestone of the Jurassic period.
