= Pan Beck Fen =

Protected area in North Yorkshire, England

Coordinates: 53.998903°N 2.2348880°W

Pan Beck Fen is a Site of Special Scientific Interest (SSSI) in North Yorkshire, England. It is located 0.6 miles (1 km) southwest of the village of Hellifield. This protected area has fen and wetland habitats near to a stream called Pan Beck that is a tributary of the River Ribble. This area is protected because of the diversity of plant species present.

This protected area is 220 yards (200 m) away from Hellifield sewage treatment works that discharges into Pan Beck.

== Biology ==
Wetland plants include reed grass, lesser pond sedge, blunt-flowered rush, sharp-flowered rush, meadowsweet, watermint, lesser spearwort, fen bedstraw, marsh cinquefoil and bog bean. At base-rich flushes, plant species also include marsh lousewort, yellow sedge, marsh arrowgrass, common cotton-grass, tawny sedge, bog rush, marsh valerian, marsh pennywort, butterwort , bird's-eye primrose, narrow-leaved marsh orchid and marsh helleborine.
