= Haugh and Gundale Slacks =

Protected area in North Yorkshire, England

Coordinates: 54.278676°N 0.77130047°W

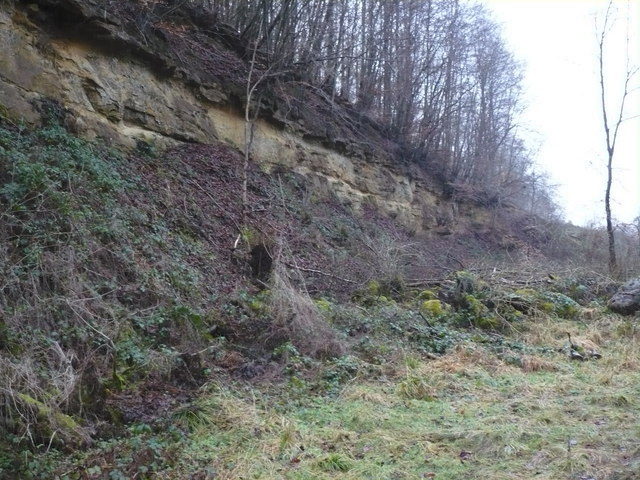
Sandstone rockface in Gundale

Haugh and Gundale Slacks is a Site of Special Scientific Interest (SSSI) in North Yorkshire in England. It is located 1.9 miles (3 km) north of the town of Pickering. This area is protected because of the diversity of plants in the limestone grasslands here and the insects found within disused sand quarries near Saintoft grange. The protected area of Haugh and Gundale Slacks SSSI consists of five separate habitat patches within the valley of Gundale Beck and includes the woodlands Wailes Hagg Wood and Haugh Wood.

Between 1919 and 1961 a tramway running along the valley of the Gundale Beck was used by the Pickering Sand Company to transport sand and sandstone from quarries to the North Yorkshire Moors Railway.

== Biology ==
In the limestone grasslands with sheep grazing, plant species include thyme, rockrose, salad burnet, fairy flax, hoary plantain, cowslip, carline thistle, woolly thistle, saw-wort and dropwort. Orchid species include fragrant orchid, fly orchid, pyramidal orchid and burnt-tip orchid. Butterfly species in this grassland include the northern brown argus, the pearl-bordered fritilary and the Duke of Burgundy fritilary. Moth species include the small eggar, the beech-green carpet and the square-spotted clay moth.

The sandstone cliffs near Saintoft Grange support many species of mining bees and mining wasps, including species within the genus Andrena: Andrena ruficrus and Andrena ocreata, and also the spider-hunting wasps Priocnemis schioedtei (genus Priocnemis) and Priocnemis susterai.

In Wailes Hagg Wood, herbs beneath the trees include sanicle, sweet woodruff, herb paris, early purple orchid and greater butterfly orchid.

== Land ownership ==
Part of the land within Haugh and Gundale Slacks SSSI is owned by the Duchy of Lancaster.
