= Birkwith Caves and Fell =

Protected area in North Yorkshire, England

Coordinates: 54.185698°N 2.3003054°W

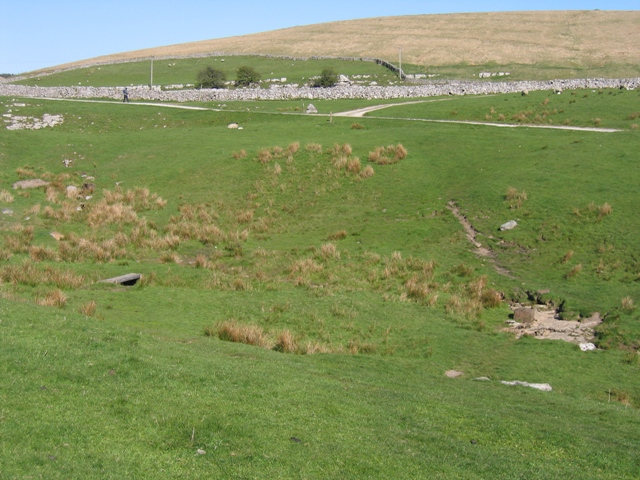
Dismal Hill within Birkwith Caves and Fell SSSI

Birkwith Caves and Fell is a Site of Special Scientific Interest (SSSI) within Yorkshire Dales National Park in North Yorkshire, England. It is located 1.2 miles (2 km) north-east of the village of Selside. This area is protected for both its geological and biological features. Important geological features include cave passages underneath Birkwith Moor that lie above the local water table. Biological features include a diversity of plants in acidic grassland and limestone pavement habitats.

== Geology ==
The Birkwith Caves are situated within the Great Scar Limestone Group. This cave system has over 4.5 km of known passages between the sink known as Red Moss Pot and the resurgence known as Birkwith Cave. The position of these caves above the water table is referred to as a perched aquifer. The Birkwith Caves show the importance of shale beds in the development of cave systems.

== Biology ==
Plant species within the limestone pavement habitat include fairy flax and salad burnet, as well as the fern species green spleenwort and brittle bladder-fern. Plant species in wet grassland include selfheal, sneezewort, devil's-bit-scabious, lesser spearwort, marsh lousewort, marsh valerian, bird's-eye primrose and globeflower. In patches of woodland, tree species include ash, bird cherry and hazel and herbaceous species include dog's mercury, giant bellflower, lady's bedstraw and small scabious. In wet woodland, herbs include marsh-marigold, wild angelica, meadowsweet and wild basil.
