= Beck Dale Meadow =

Protected area in North Yorkshire, England

Coordinates: 54°5′2″N 0°49′46″W

Beck Dale Meadow is a Site of Special Scientific Interest (SSSI) in the Yorkshire Wolds in North Yorkshire, England. It is located 0.9 miles (1.5 km) northeast of the village of Westow in the valley of Howl Beck, a tributary of the River Derwent. This area is protected because of the neutral (pH 6.6–7.3) grassland found here.

== Biology ==
Plant species include devil's-bit scabious, betony, pignut, bitter vetch, heath speedwell, common milkwort, harebell, lousewort, lady's mantle, great burnet and common spotted orchid. In swamp areas, plant species include marsh valerian, marsh willowherb, fen bedstraw and bog stitchwort. Butterfly species include the marbled white.

Snail species include Columella edentula, Vertigo antivertigo and Vertigo substriata.
