= Harwood Dale Forest =

Forest in North Yorkshire, England

- Forestry Track, Standingstones Rigg
- Interactive map of Harwood Dale Forest

Geography
- Location: North Yorkshire, England
- Coordinates: 54.3720°N 0.5120°W
- Elevation: 120–240 metres (390–790 ft)
- Area – maximum: 748.7 hectares (1,850 acres) in 2015

Administration
- Authority: Forestry England

Harwood Dale Forest is a 748.7-hectare (1,850-acre) woodland in North Yorkshire, England. The forest lies within the North York Moors National Park and is maintained by Forestry England.

== History ==
The land that the forest covers was previously moorland and rough pastureland which was acquired in the 1920s by the Forestry Commission. The forest is bisected by the A171 road (between Scarborough and Whitby), which runs on a north-west to south-east axis. Harwood Dale Forest ranges from 120 metres (390 ft) above sea level at the southern end to 240 metres (790 ft) at the northern end around Pye Rigg Howe.

Part of the north-western forest consists of the Harwood Dale Moor SSSI, which is noted for its geological history as it was not affected by the last glaciation period, and so pre-dates that time.

Overall, 79% of the forest consists of evergreen trees (around 591.1 hectares (1,461 acres)), 13% is broadleaf cover (around 100.3 hectares (248 acres)), and the other 8% is heathland or planned open areas (57.1 hectares (141 acres)). The forest contains at least five scheduled monuments, including round barrows and cairns. The stone circle at Standingstones Rigg is outside of the forest on the very edge of the south-east corner at SE982969. The forest is maintained by Forestry England.

== Recreation ==
There is no formal provision for recreation in the forest, although the area is designated as open access land under the Countryside Rights of Way Act (2000), and there are bridleways and pathways through the forest. The forest lies entirely within the North York Moors National Park.

== Wildlife ==
The forest is home to roe deer, badgers, squirrels, foxes, and dragonflies are to be found in and around the ponds and ditches. In terms of birdlife, nightjars, wood warbler, spotted fly catcher, marsh tit, and woodcocks have all been reported, and the forest is host to a large population of adders.

== See also ==
- List of Sites of Special Scientific Interest in North Yorkshire
