= Yockenthwaite Meadows =

Protected area in North Yorkshire, England

Coordinates: 54.203070°N 2.1379343°W

Yockenthwaite Meadows is a Site of Special Scientific Interest (SSSI) within Yorkshire Dales National Park in North Yorkshire, England. It is located 500m east of the hamlet of Yockenthwaite in Langstrothdale. The River Wharfe forms the southern boundary of this protected area that is important because of the plant species diversity in these meadows. The geology underlying the valley slopes is carboniferous limestone.

Yockenthwaite Meadows SSSI is adjacent to Upper Wharfdale SSSI and so is part of a wider area of nature protection.

== Biology ==
Plant species in the meadows near the edge of the River Wharfe include common knapweed, pignut, yellow rattle and wood crane's bill. On shallow limestone soils, plant species include autumn hawkbit, bugle, devils-bit scabious, salad burnet, hoary plantain, fairy flax and common milkwort. Orchid species including frog orchid, fragrant orchid and greater butterfly orchid have been recorded in this protected area, as have the fern species adder's-tongue and moonwort.

== Land ownership ==
All land within Yockenthwaite Meadows SSSI is owned by the National Trust.

Hay cutting is an important management technique in these meadows.
