= Pakenham Meadows =

Protected area in Suffolk, England

Coordinates: 52.282°N 0.834°E

- Site of Special Scientific Interest
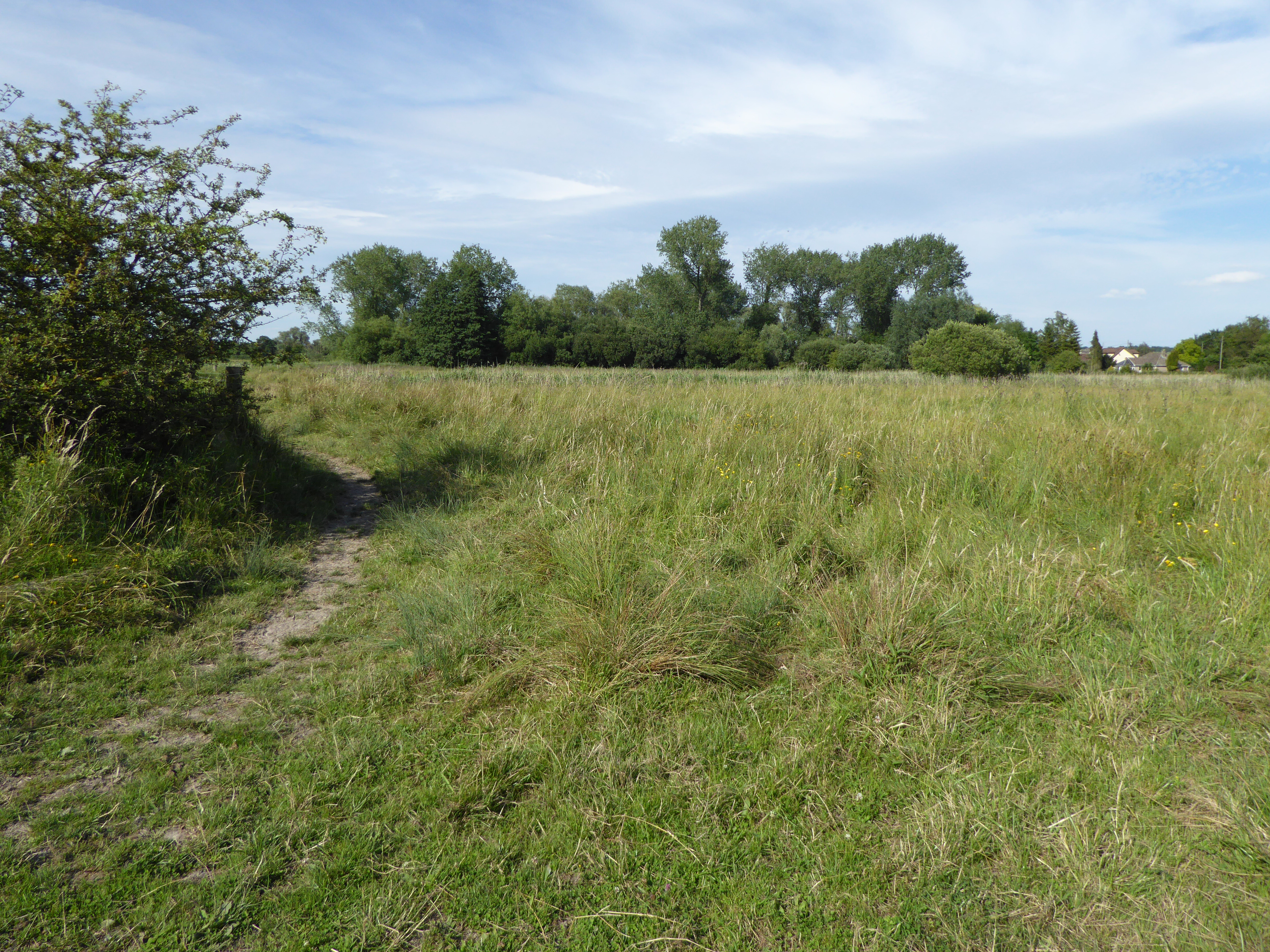
- Location of Pakenham Meadows.
- Area of search: Suffolk
- Grid reference: TL 934 686
- Interest: Biological
- Area: 5.8 hectares
- Notification date: 1989
- Location map: Magic Map

Pakenham Meadows is a 5.8-hectare (14-acre) biological Site of Special Scientific Interest north of Pakenham in Suffolk.

This unimproved and poorly drained meadow has a variety of soil types from loam to peat, and the vegetation types are correspondingly diverse. The herb-rich grassland has yellow rattle, bugle, fen bedstraw, oxe-eye daisy, ragged robin and southern marsh orchid.

A public footpath from Fen Road goes through the site.
