= Kettlewell Meadows =

Protected area in North Yorkshire, England

Coordinates: 54°9′19″N 2°3′48″W

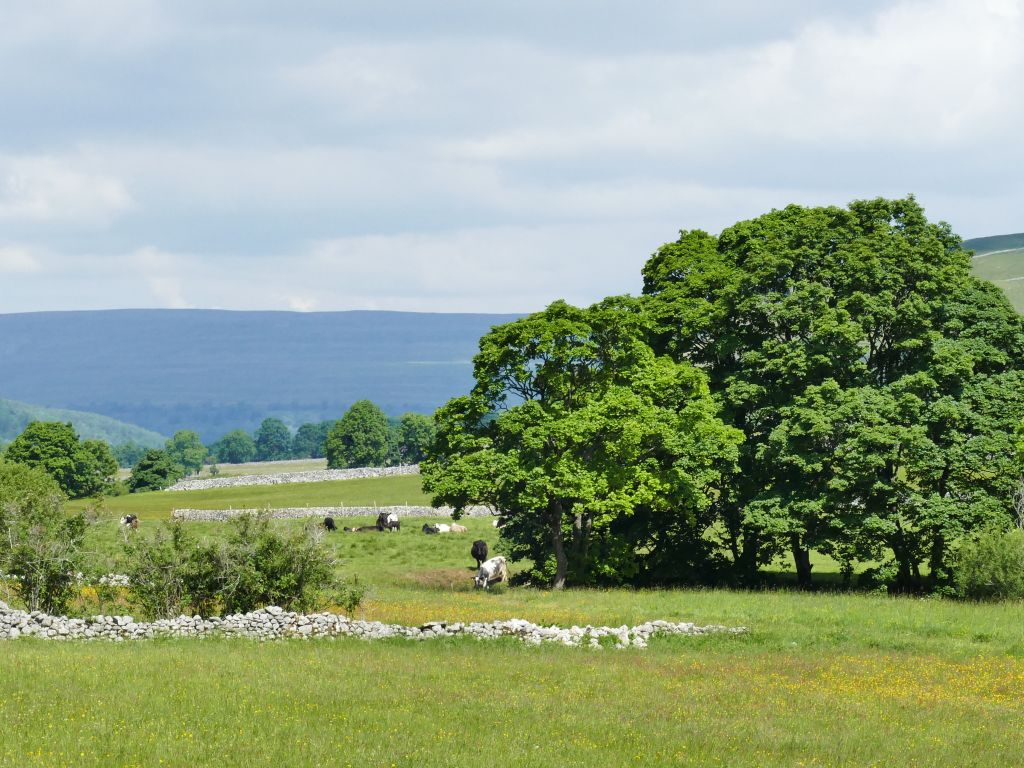
Floodplain meadows near the River Wharfe

Kettlewell Meadows (North Yorkshire)

Kettlewell Meadows is a Site of Special Scientific Interest (SSSI) within Yorkshire Dales National Park, in North Yorkshire, England. It is located in Wharfedale between the villages of Starbotton and Kettlewell. It is protected because of the botanically rich floodplain grassland maintained by a traditional management regime. The long-distance footpath called the Dales Way passes through this protected area.

Kettlewell Meadows is adjacent to another protected area called River Wharfe SSSI.

== Biology ==
Plant species near the banks of the River Wharfe include great burnet, meadowsweet, rough hawkbit, devil's-bit scabious, melancholy thistle, water avens, red clover, marsh horsetail, pepper-saxifrage and adder's-tongue. In particularly wet areas, plants include marsh-marigold.

In dry calcareous grassland, plants include pignut, yellow rattle, bulbous buttercup and fragrant orchid.

== Land ownership ==
Kettlewell Meadows SSSI has four separate land areas, three north of the river and one south of the river. The National Trust owns part of the land area within Kettlewell Meadows SSSI that is south of the River Wharfe, through which the Dales Way passes.
