= New House Meadows, Malham =

Protected area in North Yorkshire, England

Coordinates: 54.074°N 2.107°W

New House Meadows is a Site of Special Scientific Interest (SSSI) and National Nature Reserve within Yorkshire Dales National Park in North Yorkshire, England. It is located 1.9 miles (3 km) north-east of the village of Malham and 0.6 miles (1 km) south-west of the village of Bordley. These meadows are protected because of the plant diversity found within them.

== Biology ==
Plant species within the meadows include wood crane's-bill, pignut, water avens, bugle, meadowsweet, greater burnet, meadow saxifrage, rough hawkbit, yellow rattle, meadow buttercup, red clover, melancholy thistle and common bistort.

Near a stream called Cow Gill is a limestone cliff up to 5m high over which some springs flow. Here plant species include small scabious, slender St. John's-wort, dog's mercury, common valerian, wild basil, alpine cinquefoil, greater butterfly-orchid and orpine.

== Land ownership ==
All land within New House Meadows SSSI is owned by the National Trust. From January 1954 to December 1996 New House Farm was owned by Walter Umpleby until the farm's sale to the National Trust. Walter Umpleby kept detailed records of farm management over this period.
