= Grassington Hospital Grounds =

Protected area in North Yorkshire, England

Coordinates: 54.0675°N 1.9775°W

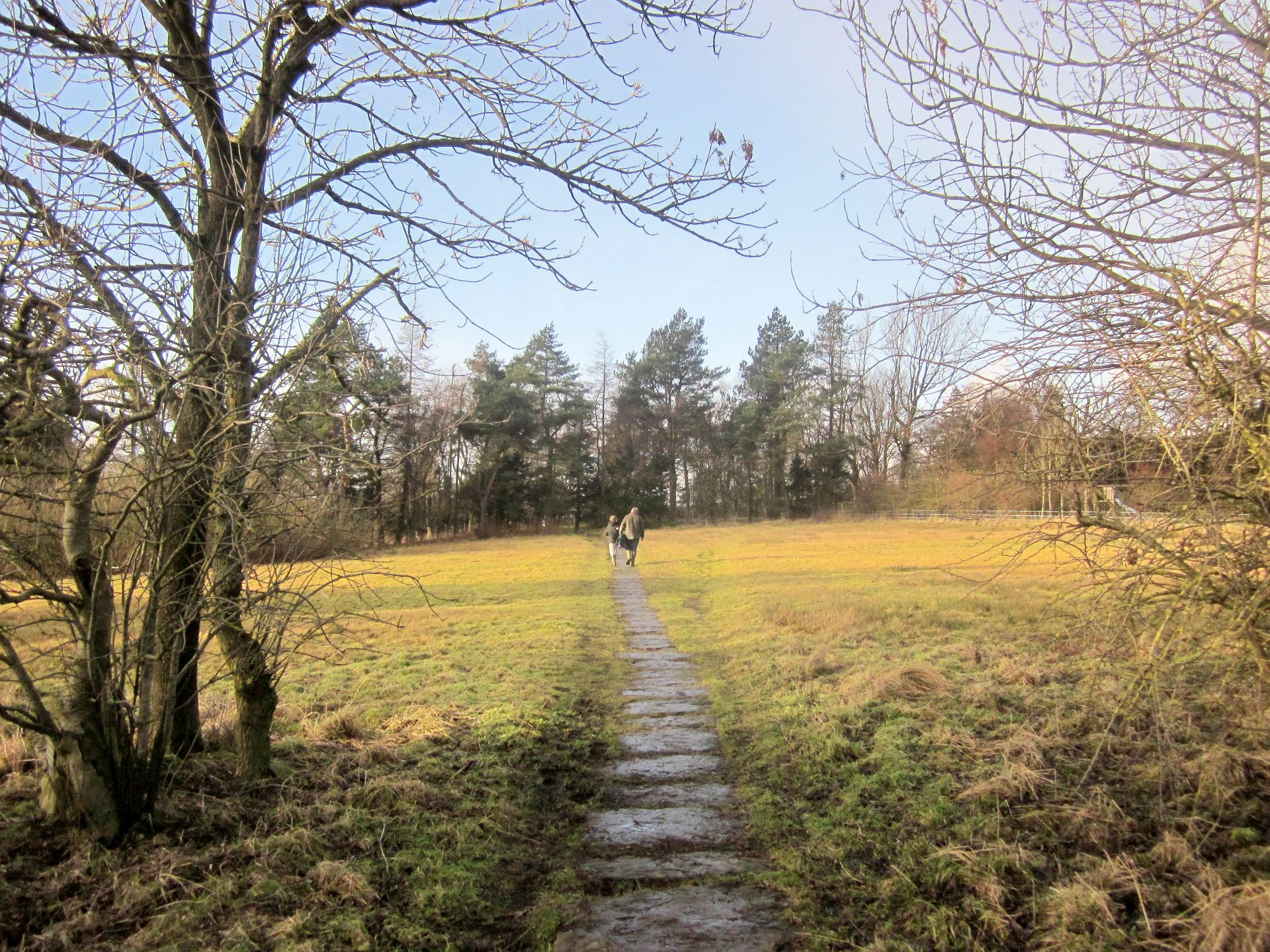
Meadow in Grassington Hospital Grounds

Grassington Hospital Grounds is a Site of Special Scientific Interest (SSSI) within Yorkshire Dales National Park in North Yorkshire, England. It is located 1.2km east of the town of Grassington. Grassington Hospital was built in 1919 and closed in 1984. In 1996 some of the hospital buildings were converted to residential buildings. This protected area includes hay meadows within the old hospital site that are some of the best examples of herb-rich neutral grassland within Yorkshire Dales National Park.

The Upper Wharfdale Field Society visited this protected area in 2025, logging the presence of a diverse range of plants.

== Biology ==
Plant species in the meadows include great burnet, common knapweed, oxeye daisy, rough hawkbit, cat's-ear, field wood-rush, melancholy thistle, sneezewort and wood anemone. In wet seepage zones, plant species include marsh valerian, devil's-bit scabious, marsh ragwort, water avens, meadowsweet and bugle.

== Management ==
Past management of this land has involved no input of nutrients and no grazing.
