= Low Gill Moor Wetlands =

Wetlands in North Yorkshire, England

Coordinates: 54°16′57″N 2°3′36″W

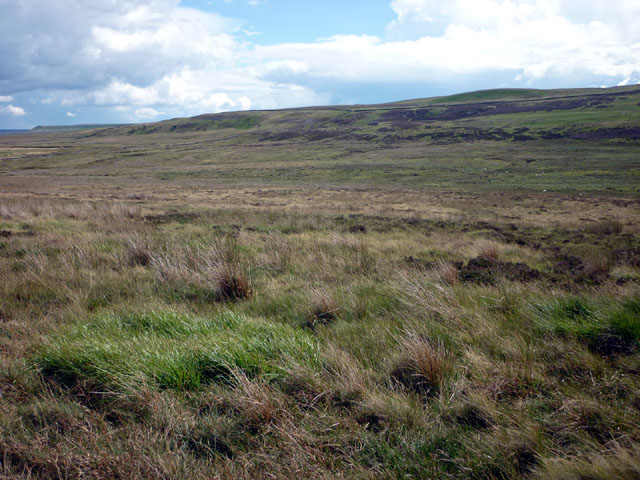
Thornton Rust Moor

Low Gill Moor Wetlands is a Site of Special Scientific Interest (SSSI) within Yorkshire Dales National Park in North Yorkshire, England. It is located 1.5km southwest of the village of Thornton Rust in moorland referred to as Thornton Rust Moor. This area is protected because of the plants, mosses and animals that occur in and around the calcareous streams here. The streams here drain into the River Ure in Wensleydale.

== Biology ==
The flood zone of calcareous streams forms important habitat for plant and moss species. Moss species here include curled hookmoss (Palustriella commutata), rusty hookmoss (Drepanocladus revolvens, now regarded as within the genus Scorpidium), yellow starry feathermoss (Campylium stellatum), and hooked scorpion-moss (Scorpidium scorpioides). (Note: See the British Bryological Society Scorpidium scorpioides entry) The moss Sphagnum subnitens is also found here. Herbaceous species include arrowgrass (Triglochin palustris), common butterwort (Pinguicula vulgaris), grass-of-Parnassus (Parnassia palustris), bird's-eye primrose (Primula farinosa), round-leaved sundew (Drosera rotundifolia) and lesser twayblade (Neottia cordata). Lesser clubmoss (Selaginella selaginoides) is also found here, as is the alga Chara vulgaris.

Within the river channels, moss species include Philonotis fontana (Note: See the British Bryological Society Philonotis-fontana entry) and plant species include bog pondweed (Potamogeton polygonifolius) and Blinks (Montia fontana).

Bird species recorded in this protected area include curlew, lapwing, snipe, redshank and red grouse.

There is a shooting hut within this protected area.
