= Conistone Old Pasture =

Protected area in North Yorkshire, England

Coordinates: 54.098894°N 2.0152561°W

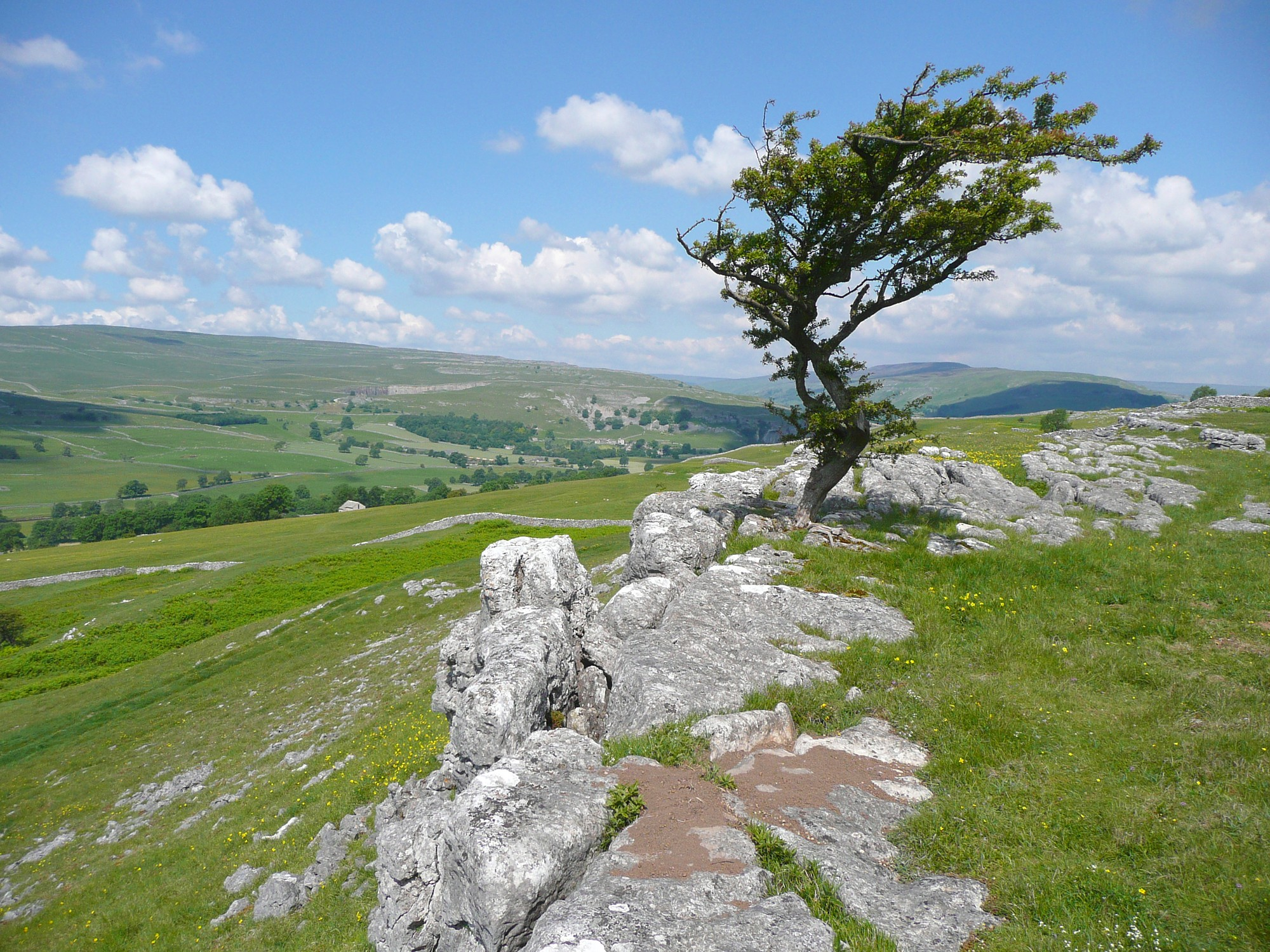
Conistone Old Pasture

Conistone Old Pasture is a Site of Special Scientific Interest (SSSI) within Yorkshire Dales National Park in North Yorkshire, England. It is located 1.2 miles (2 km) north of the town of Grassington and it borders the village of Conistone. This area is protected because of the species rich calcareous grassland and the biological and geological importance of the limestone pavements within this protected area. The long-distance footpath called the Dales Way passes through this protected area.

Conistone Old Pasture SSSI is adjacent to another protected area called Bastow Wood SSSI. A previously recognised Site of Special Scientific Interest here was called Conistone Old Pasture and Bastow Wood.

== Biology ==
Plant species in the calcareous grassland include rockrose, dropwort, limestone bedstraw, grass-of-parnassus and bird's-eye primrose.

Plant species in the limestone pavements are largely restricted to the grikes due to sheep grazing. These limestone pavement plants include alpine cinquefoil, lily-of-the-valley and herb paris.

Plant species in a hay meadow (a northern hay meadow) called Little Lathe include great burnet and pignut.

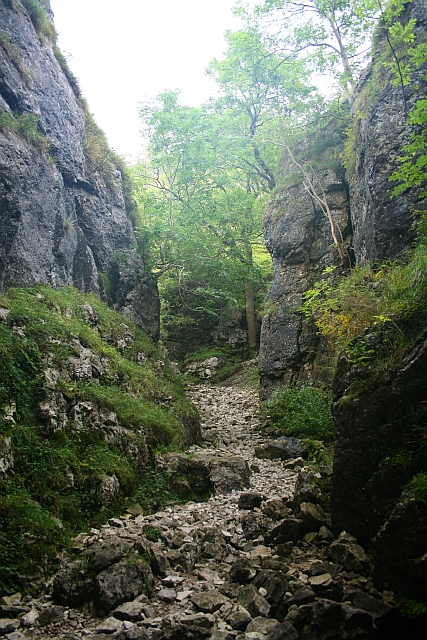
Conistone Dib

== Geology ==
Conistone Old Pasture is within a karst landscape of Carboniferous limestone. The slabs of the limestone pavements are large and have few fractures. Conistone Dib is a dry meltwater channel and Dib Scar is a dry waterfall in this protected area.
