= Bride Stones =

Protected area in North Yorkshire, England

Coordinates: 54°18′39″N 0°39′36″W

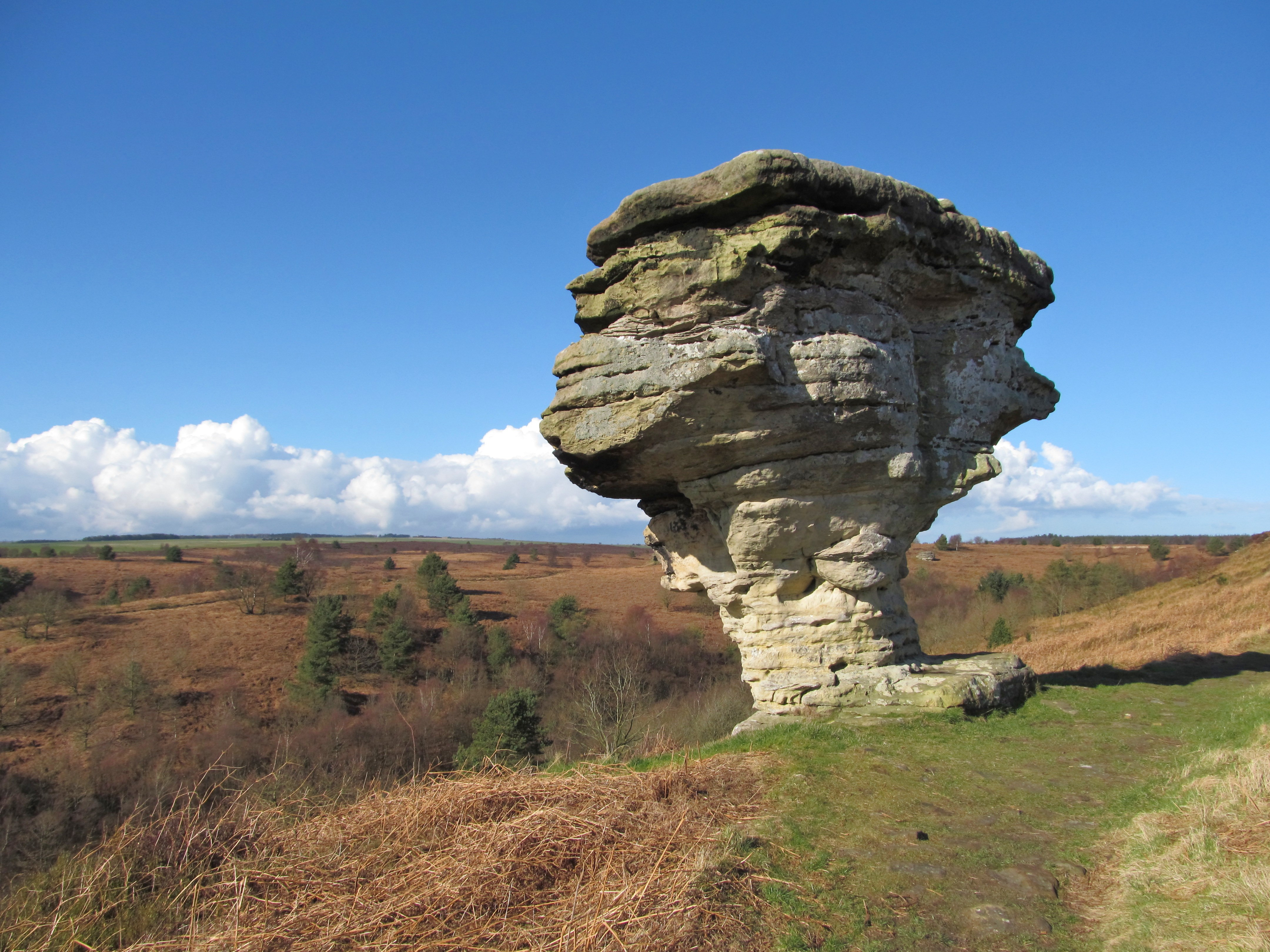
One of the Bride Stones

Bride Stones is a Site of Special Scientific Interest (SSSI) within North York Moors National Park in North Yorkshire, England. It is located 1.9 miles (3 km) east of the village of Lockton, on the western edge of Dalby Forest. This area is protected because of the geology of the Bride Stone rock stacks and the plants that are found around them.

The streams in this protected area flow into Staindale Beck that flows into Thornton Beck that is a tributary of the River Derwent. Thornton Beck also flows through Sieve Dale Fen SSSI.

== Geology ==
The Bride Stones are stacks of rock. The sandstone rocks come from the Passage Beds of the Hambleton member of the Coralline Oolite Formation from the Jurassic period. These stacks of rock have formed from weathering processes.

== Biology ==
The stones are surrounded by moorland where plant species include cross-leaved heath, hare's-tail cotton-grass, common cotton-grass, bilberry, cowberry and crowberry. Oak woodland occurs in the south of this protected area, where herbaceous species include opposite-leaved golden-saxifrage.

== Land ownership ==
All land within Bride Stones SSSI is owned by the National Trust.
