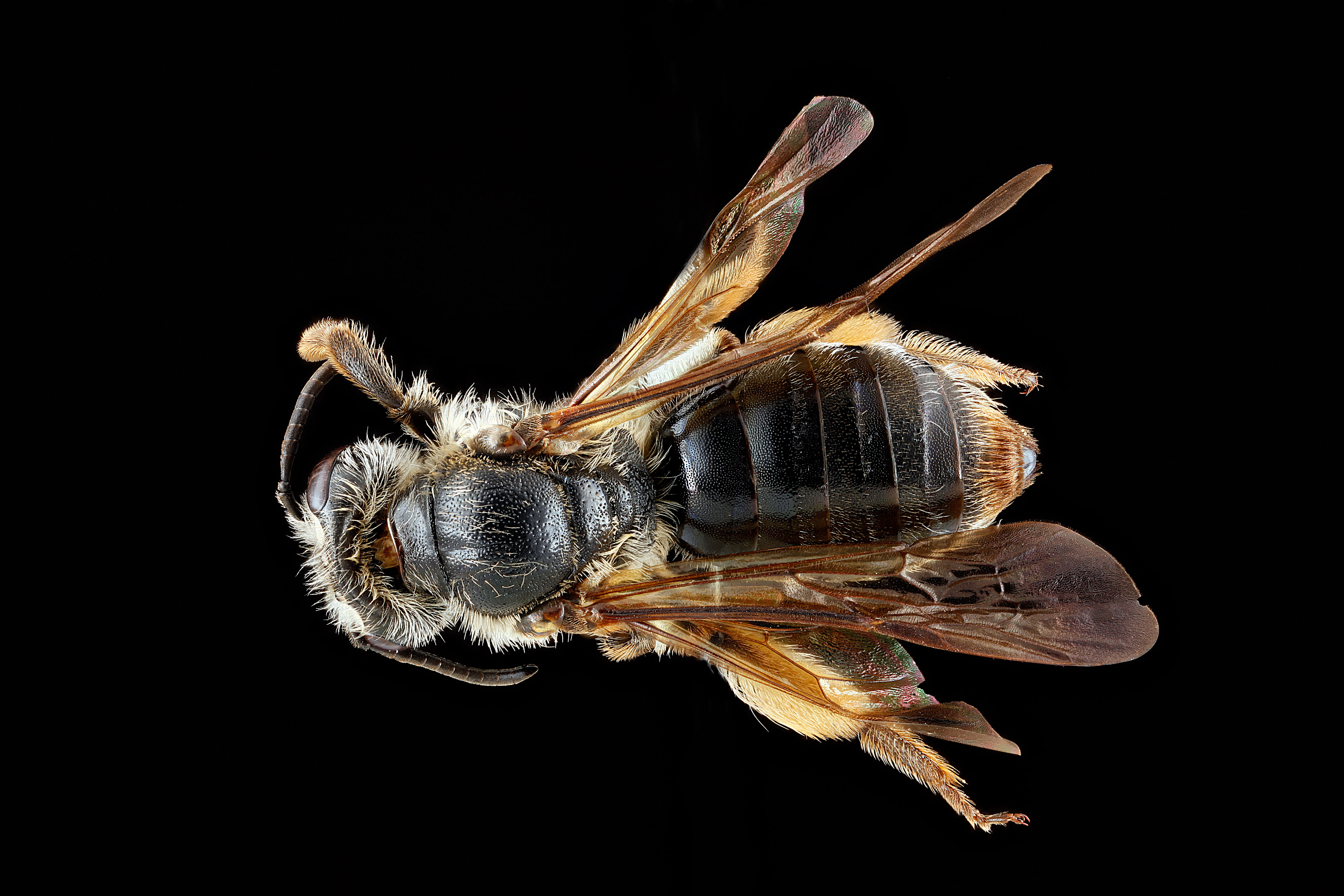

Scientific classification
- Domain: Eukaryota
- Kingdom: Animalia
- Phylum: Arthropoda
- Class: Insecta
- Order: Hymenoptera
- Family: Andrenidae
- Genus: Andrena
- Species: A. crataegi

Binomial name
- Andrena crataegi Robertson, 1893

= Andrena crataegi =

Species of bee

Andrena crataegi, the hawthorn miner bee, is a species of miner bee in the family Andrenidae which is in the order Hymenoptera ("ants, bees, wasps and sawflies"). Another common name for this species is hawthorn andrena. It is found in North America.
