= Newby Moor =

Protected area in North Yorkshire, England

Coordinates: 54.117882°N 2.4344417°W

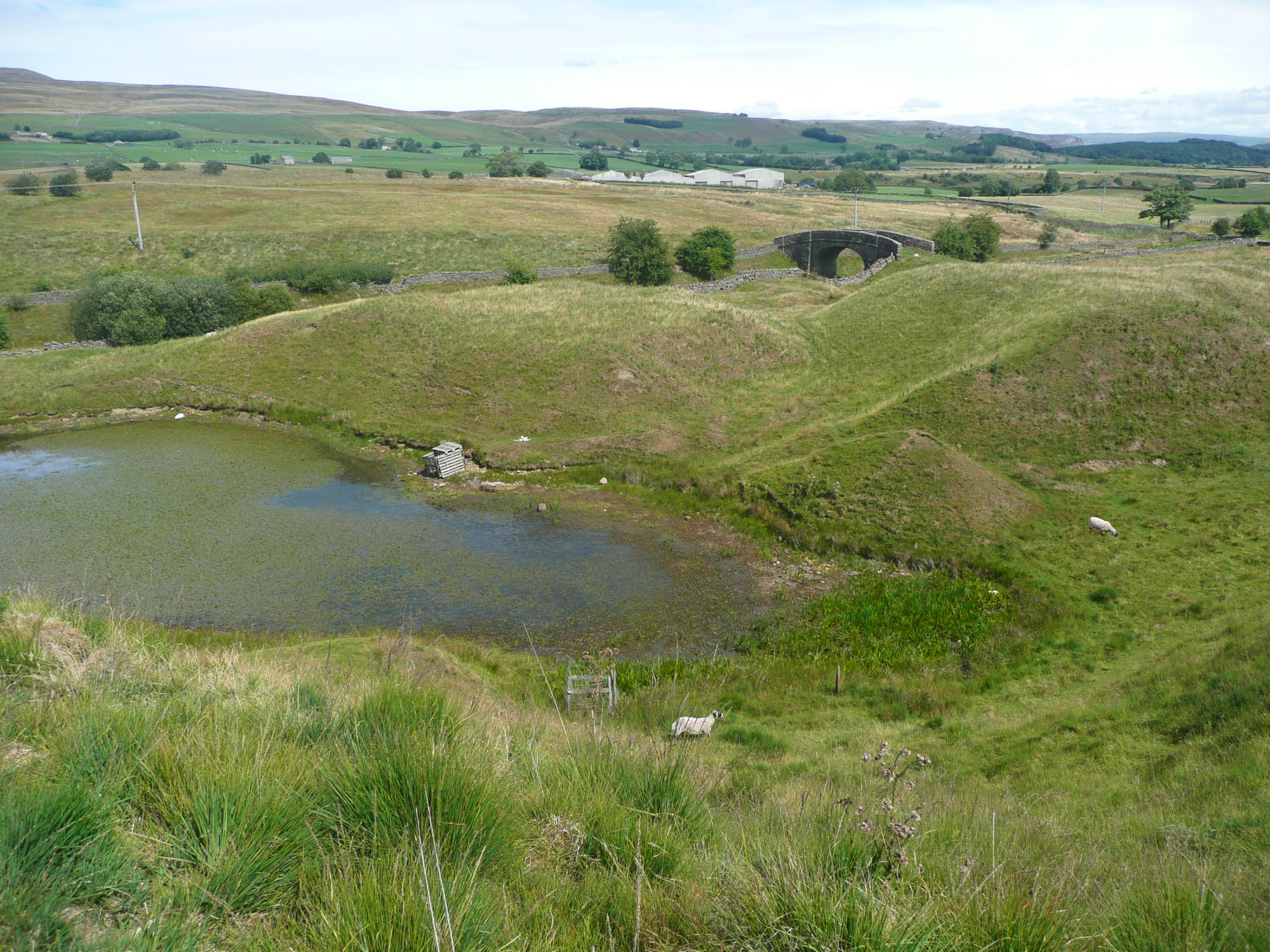
Disused quarry on Newby Moor

Newby Moor is a Site of Special Scientific Interest (SSSI) in North Yorkshire, England. It is located 4km east of the town of High Bentham. This protected area comprises an area of peatland and fen habitats that encircle Green Close Farm (Northern Pennine Club for caving has accommodation on this farm). This protected area includes Sniddle Moss. Streams from this protected area flow into the River Wenning. The A65 road passes through this protected area. The dismantled Ingleton branch line historically passed through this landscape.

== Biology ==
Plants on this moorland include cross-leaved heath, bog asphodel, round-leaved sundew, cranberry and bog-myrtle. In very wet areas, plants include bogbean and marsh cinquefoil. The pond in the disused quarry contains a population of narrow-leaved water-plantain.

Bird species recorded at Newby Moor SSSI include snipe, redshank, curlew, lapwing, reedbunting and linnet.
