= Brants Gill Catchment =

Protected area in North Yorkshire, England

Coordinates: 54.142658°N 2.2571323°W

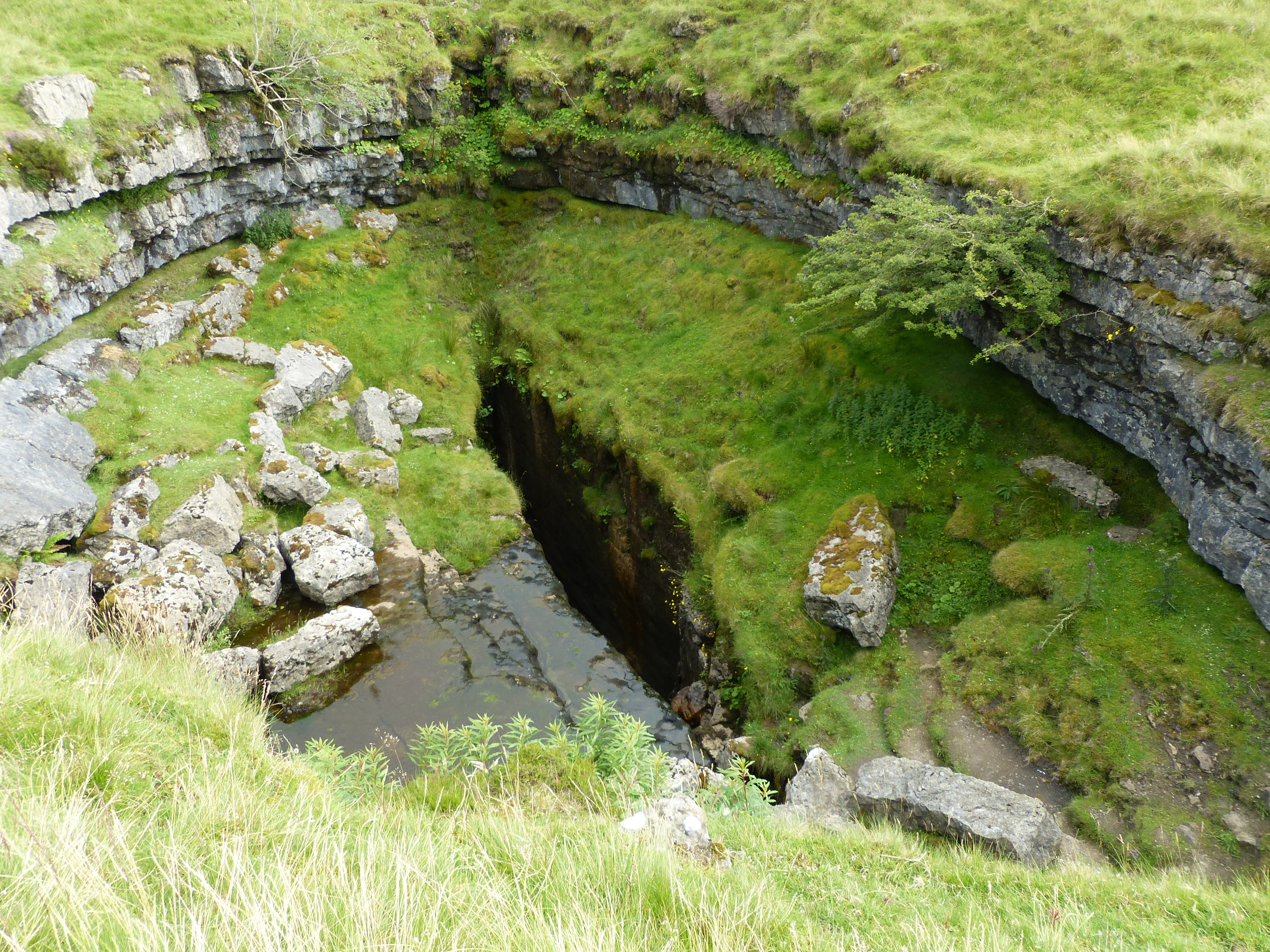
Hunt Pot within Brants Gill Catchment SSSI

Brants Gill Catchment is a Site of Special Scientific Interest (SSSI) within Yorkshire Dales National Park in North Yorkshire, England. It is located 1km east of the village of Horton in Ribblesdale on the lower slopes of Pen-y-ghent. Belowground under this protected area is an excellent cave system that includes Hull Pot and Little Hull Pot and Hunt Pot near the Horton Scar Line. This protected area includes three separate land areas. The eastern-most section of this protected area on Fountains Fell includes the cave systems connected to Echo Pot, Antler Hole, Hammer Pot and Gingling Hole. The streams from these cave systems flow into the River Ribble.

Brants Gill Catchment SSSI is adjacent to Pen-y-Ghent SSSI, and so forms part of a wider area of nature protection.

== Geology ==
In Brants Gill Catchment SSSI, the Great Scar Limestone forms an extensive outcrop. At the base of this limestone are slates. Hull Pot is the largest sink feeding the Brants Gill Catchment cave system. Its entrance pothole is 90 m long and 20 m wide and deep. Hunt Pot has a rift entrance 25 m long and 4 m wide on a minor north-south fault. Little Hull Pot has a meandering vadose canyon which leads to two shafts dropping 60 m to a rift passage along a minor fault. Gingling Hole contains over 5200m of known passages, reaching a depth of 192m. From Gingling Hole, vadose canyons and small shafts descend to a series of large chambers at a depth of 50m; these include Stalactite Chamber and Fool's Paradise, both exceptionally well decorated with calcite straws and dripstone. The deep shafts of Gingling Hole are aligned on tectonic fractures.

Burnley Caving Club have made a video of an expedition down Gingling Hole.
