= Beast Cliff =

Sea cliff in North Yorkshire, England

- Cliff
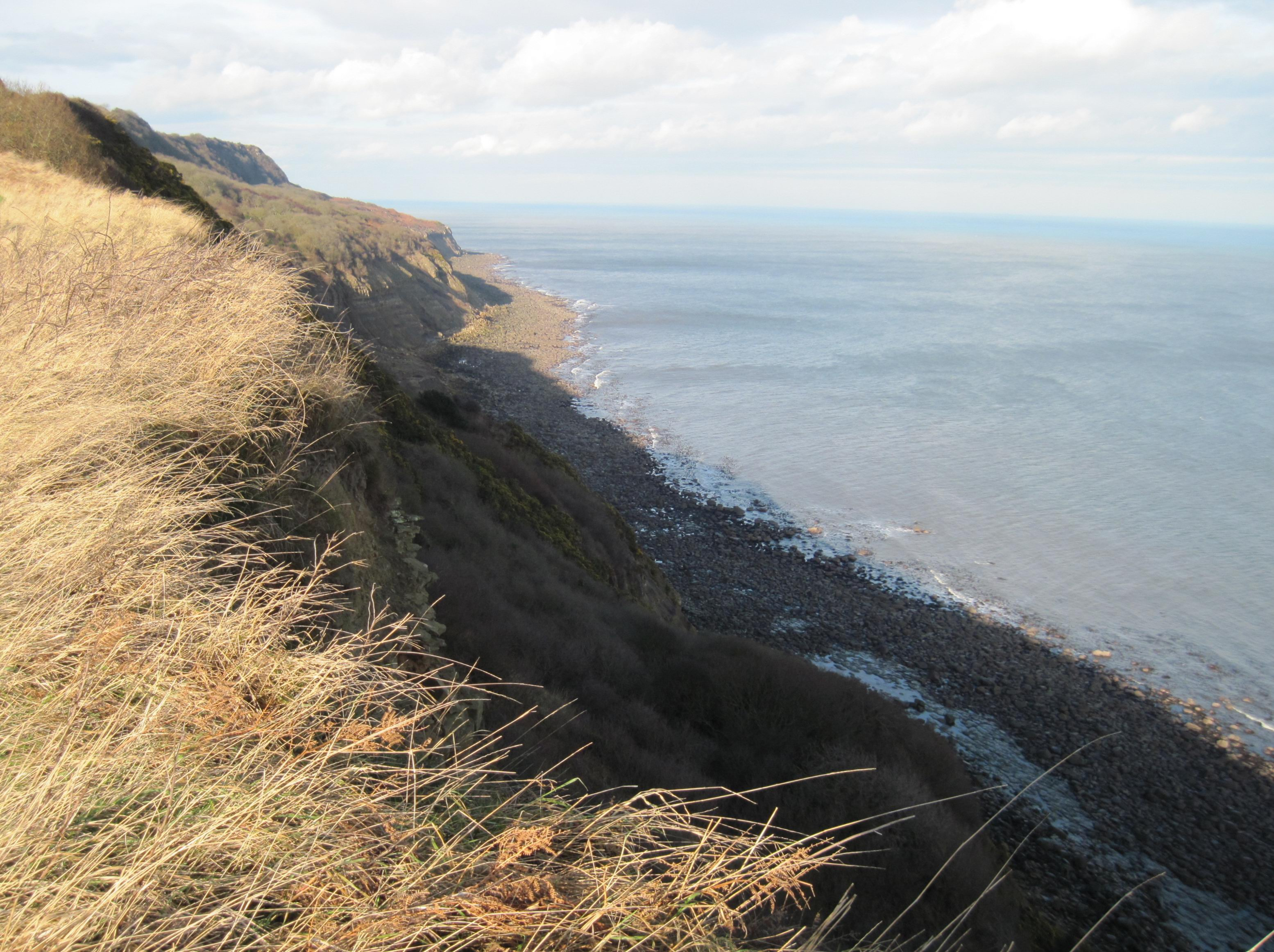
- Looking north along Beast Cliff showing the intermediate plateau aligned with the horizon (2012)

- Coordinates: 54°22′50″N 0°27′34″W
- Grid position: TA0099
- Topo map: OS Explorer OL27

Beast Cliff is a steep sea cliff situated about halfway between Whitby and Scarborough on the coast of North Yorkshire in northeastern England. Beast Cliff is at the southern end of a coastal region designated as a Special Area of Conservation and Site of Special Scientific Interest. Bordering the eastern edge of the North York Moors national park, the Cleveland Way runs at the head of the cliffs.

In terms of its position on the Ordnance Survey National Grid system of geographical mapping, Beast Cliff is mostly in the one-kilometre grid square TA0099 but at its northern end it extends into OV. That point is the only area of land in the entire 100-kilometre national grid square of OV, adjoining NZ, SE and TA.

== Description ==
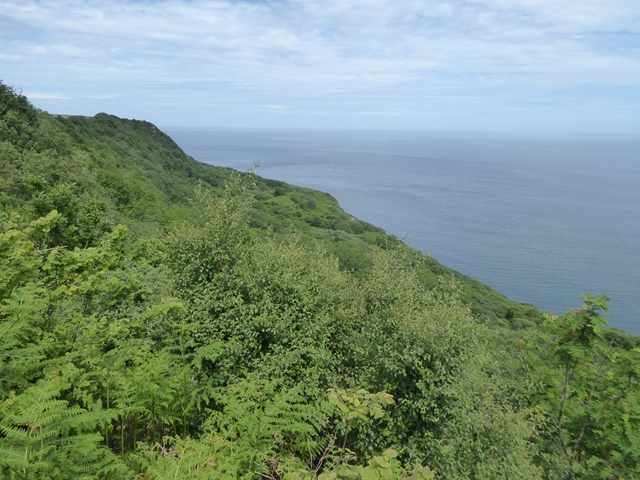
Wooded area above undercliff (2018)

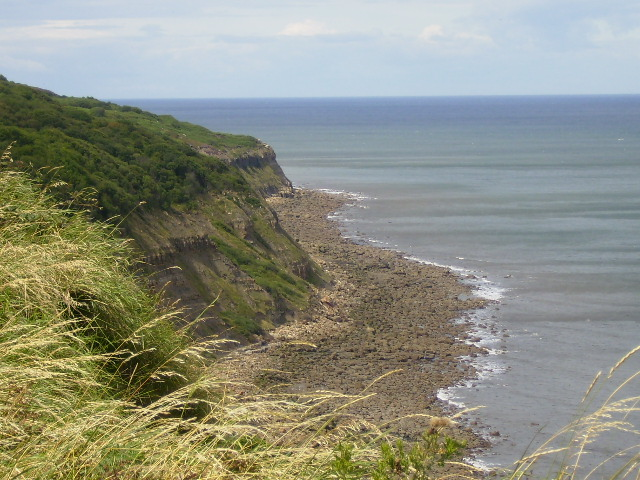
Northern end of Beast Cliff at OV0000 (2007)

Beast Cliff is formed from rocks of Jurassic sandstone and shale and is highly vegetated with a wide variety of flora. Scrub and woodland grow on a moderately sloping intermediate plateau part way down the main cliff. This plateau separates lower and upper steeper cliffs. The undercliff is some 45 metres (148 ft) high and it consists of two steep slopes with a near-vertical face in between which varies in height around about 5 metres (16 ft). The 75-metre (246 ft) upper cliff slopes at about 45°. The total height of the cliff is about 160 metres (520 ft).

The cliffs are geologically unstable and frequent landslides intrude upon the woodland, which is therefore constantly renewed with young trees. Mosses and ferns cover sandstone boulders. The woodland is flourishing with juvenile ash and birch growing through a lush understorey, and with alder and willow near pools of water. The Cleveland Way long-distance footpath follows along at the head of the cliffs. At one time animals were lowered on ropes to the intermediate plateau for grazing.

The whole stretch of coast between Maw Wyke and Beast Cliff around Robin Hood's Bay is a designated Site of Special Scientific Interest with an area of 365 hectares (900 acres). Beast Cliff itself, at the southern end of this area, is regarded as nationally important for its coastal and woodland vegetation. Part of the area is also designated as a 265-hectare (650-acre) Special Area of Conservation, "Beast Cliff–Whitby (Robin Hood's Bay)". The Natura 2000 improvement plan for the site involves extending its boundaries to allow geomorphological processes to take place undisturbed; preventing inappropriate drainage and coastal defences; and permitting appropriate grazing.

On 10 February 1923, the Grimsby steam trawler FV Premier was wrecked after running aground and the lifeboat from Robin Hood's Bay rescued all nine crew. Later the fishing vessel broke up in heavy seas at the foot of Beast Cliff.

== Geographical coordinate associations ==
National grid lettered squares

=== National Grid square ===
At the northern end of Beast Cliff is a place that is unique in terms of the British National Grid system of geographical coordinates. The one-kilometre square OV0000 is the only square containing land in the entire 100 kilometre by 100 kilometre square labelled OV by the Ordnance Survey and which adjoins NZ, SE and TA at their quadripoint. Indeed, OV0000 is also the only United Kingdom land within the 500-kilometre square with the prefix letter O, which is otherwise occupied by the North Sea (and a small part of Norway, if the grid is extended).

=== Geograph and OV0000 ===
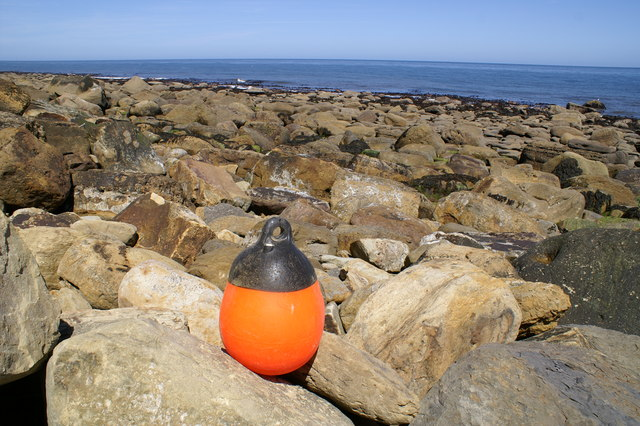
"Meeting of the myriads" at OV0000

Geograph Britain and Ireland is a project which is progressively publishing photographs of every one-kilometre square in Great Britain, based on grid references – only areas of land are included. Geograph has developed its own terminology whereby the 100-kilometre squares are called myriads and 500-kilometre squares are pentads. Traditionally there has been competition to publish the first photograph taken from within any given one-kilometre square. In the case of the first uploaded photograph of OV0000, taken by Peter Standing on 15 July 2006 and published two days later, it turned out to create another new record. In the Geograph discussion forums there had been interest in which would be the first myriad to have every square photographed. Since OV0000 was the only land square in OV and no other myriads had been completed, it also won that "race". Since that time several photographs of the grid point have been uploaded to Geograph.

Only the southwestern corner of OV0000, that is to say OV000000 and OV000001, are occupied by land – there are only some 0.5 hectares (1 acre) of foreshore, with far less above high tide at the very foot of the cliff.

=== Worked All Britain and OV00 ===
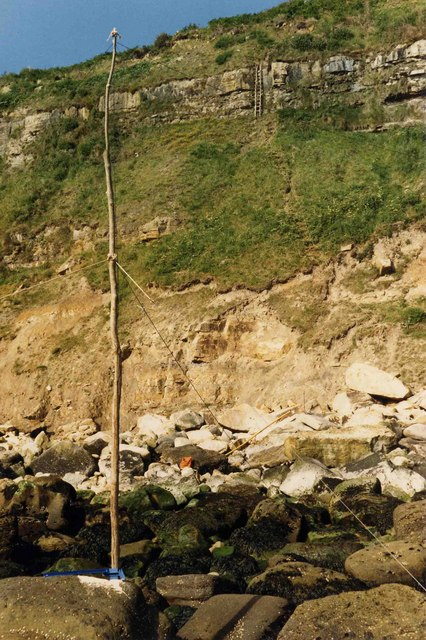
Defunct radio aerial and cliff ladder (1987 photograph)

Descent route in 2006 showing new ladders

Worked all Britain is an amateur radio awards group established in 1969 to encourage geographical knowledge and improved radio transmission techniques for amateur radio operators. There are awards for operating a radio station from as many of the OS, Irish and UTM 100-kilometre squares ("large squares") as possible and also, likewise, for 10-kilometre squares. For OV00, and hence the myriad OV, the first "activation" was on 8 September 1977.

In 1987 a specially built ladder was fitted to the steepest part of the cliff below the intermediate plateau. From War Dike Gate, on the Cleveland Way at the top of the cliff, the ladder could be reached by scrambling down the upper part of the cliff, aided by ropes. More fixed ropes led from the foot of the ladder to the shore. An 8-metre (26 ft) radio mast, constructed on a tree trunk, was put in place. However, a succession of storms in 1999 destroyed the entire set-up. A new route was built in 2006.
