= Iron Scar and Hundale Point to Scalby Ness =

Site of Special Scientific Interest on the North Sea coast of North Yorkshire, England

- Site of Special Scientific Interest
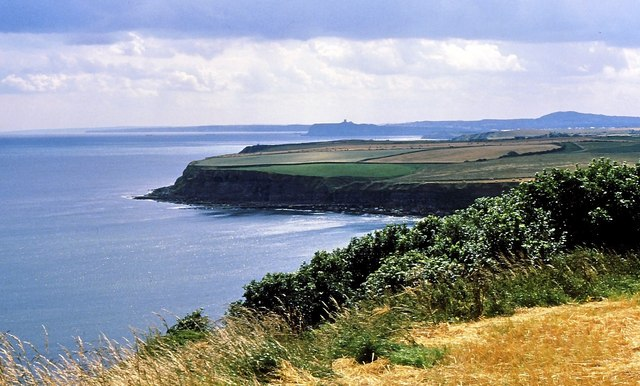
- Looking south across Cloughton Wyke to Hundale Point and beyond, with Scarborough Castle visible in the distance

- Location within North Yorkshire
- Location of Iron Scar and Hundale Point to Scalby Ness.
- Area of search: North Yorkshire
- Grid reference: TA 029 928
- Coordinates: 54.320415°N 0.419507°W
- Interest: Geological
- Area: 116.86 hectares (288.8 acres)
- Notification date: 1986
- Location map: Magic Map

Iron Scar and Hundale Point to Scalby Ness is a 116.86-hectare (288.8-acre) geological Site of Special Scientific Interest (SSSI) on the coast of the North Sea to the north of Scarborough in the English county of North Yorkshire. The site is split between the civil parishes of Cloughton, Burniston, and Newby and Scalby. The northern part of the SSSI is also within the North Yorkshire Moors National Park.

The SSI encompasses the cliffs and intertidal zones of the coast from Iron Scar, in the north, via Cloughton Wyke, Hundale Point, Long Nab and Cromer Point to Scalby Ness, in the south. This 5-kilometre (3.1 mi) stretch of coast provides an almost complete section through the rocks of the Lower Jurassic and Middle Jurassic period and is of national importance. Additionally, fossil plants are found at Cloughton Wyke and Scalby Ness.

Cloughton Wyke is a bay, between Iron Scar and Hundale Point, that is accessible from the cliff top. Cloughton Wyke can be accessed from either the Cleveland Way coastal path or by road along Salt Pans Road from Cloughton village. Local maps mark the existence of former salt pans in the bay. The bay is within the civil parish of Cloughton.
