= Austwick and Lawkland Mosses =

Protected area in North Yorkshire, England

Coordinates: 54.093846°N 2.3653867°W

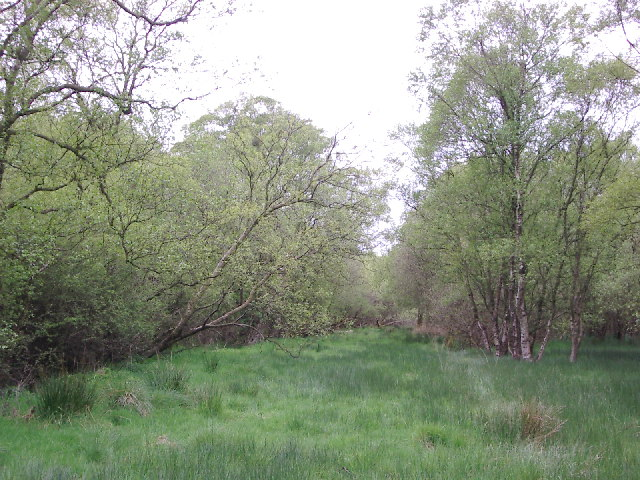
Lawkland Moss

Austwick and Lawkland Mosses is a Site of Special Scientific Interest (SSSI) within the Forest of Bowland National Landscape (see Forest of Bowland) in North Yorkshire, England. It is located 0.6 miles (1 km) north of the village of Eldroth and 1.1 miles (1.8 km) south of the village of Austwick. This area is protected because of the peatland habitats here. Streams in this protected area flow into the River Wenning. Austwick Moss and Lawkland Moss are two separate areas of raised mire that are connected by wet pasture. Historically, peat was extracted at this site.

== Biology ==
Where the peat remains wet, plant species include cranberry, bog rosemary and round-leaved sundew. Moss species include Sphagnum cuspidatum and Sphagnum recurvum. Where the bog is drier, plant species include bog myrtle, heather and bilberry. In these drier areas, downy birch also occurs. Plants in the grasslands around these peatlands include saw-wort, betony, adder's-tongue fern, dyer's greenwood, autumn crocus and common cottongrass. Butterfly species include the small pearl-bordered fritillary. Bird species recorded in this protected area include snipe, redshank, lapwing and reed bunting.

== Management ==
Lawkland Hall Estate undertake snipe shooting on Lawkland Moss.
