= Seive Dale Fen =

Protected area in North Yorkshire, England

- Site of Special Scientific Interest
- Location within North Yorkshire
- Location of Seive Dale Fen.
- Area of search: North Yorkshire
- Grid reference: SE 855877
- Coordinates: 54°16′39″N 0°41′18″W
- Area: 26.7 acres (0.11 km^{2}; 0.042 sq mi)
- Notification date: 1983

Seive Dale Fen is a Site of Special Scientific Interest within North York Moors National Park in North Yorkshire, England. The site was designated as a protected area in 1983 because of its fen vegetation that receives water from springs. Plant species include tawny sedge (Carex hostiana), flea sedge (Carex pulicaris), common sundew (Drosera rotundifolia), marsh arrow-glass (Triglochin palustris) and marsh helleborine (Epipactis palustris).

Part of the land is owned by the Duchy of Lancaster.
