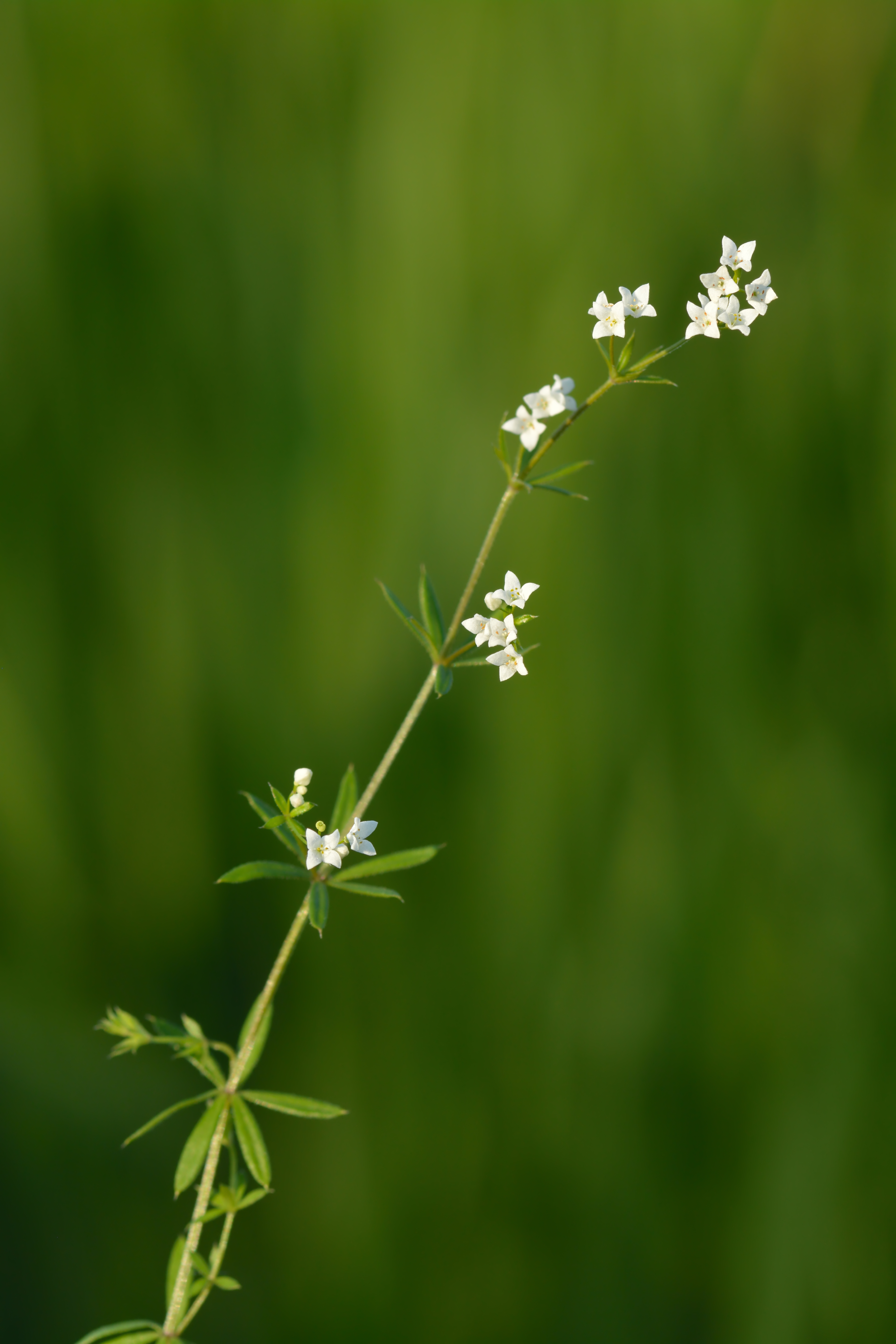

Scientific classification
- Kingdom: Plantae
- Clade: Tracheophytes
- Clade: Angiosperms
- Clade: Eudicots
- Clade: Asterids
- Order: Gentianales
- Family: Rubiaceae
- Genus: Galium
- Species: G. uliginosum

Binomial name
- Galium uliginosum L.

= Galium uliginosum =

Fen bedstraw

Species of plant

Galium uliginosum or fen bedstraw is a plant species of the genus Galium. It is widespread across most of Europe as well as Morocco, Western Siberia, Turkey, Kazakhstan and Xinjiang. It is reportedly naturalized in New Zealand, Greenland and the Crozet Islands.

Galium uliginosum is a component of purple moor grass and rush pastures – a type of Biodiversity Action Plan habitat in the UK. It occurs on poorly drained neutral and acidic soils of the lowlands and upland fringe. It is found in the South West of England, especially in Devon.

Galium uliginosum is easily confused with marsh bedstraw, Galium palustre, but is distinguished from this species by having bristly edges on its leaves, and not turning black when it dries out. The leaves are arranged in whorls of 6 to 10 around the stem, which is a characteristic feature of the bedstraw genus Galium.
