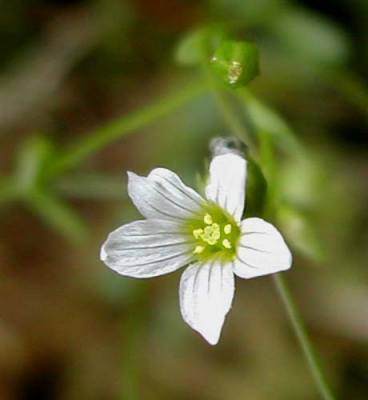

Scientific classification
- Kingdom: Plantae
- Clade: Tracheophytes
- Clade: Angiosperms
- Clade: Eudicots
- Clade: Rosids
- Order: Malpighiales
- Family: Linaceae
- Genus: Linum
- Species: L. catharticum

Binomial name
- Linum catharticum L.

Synonyms
- Cathartolinum catharticum (L.) Small; Cathartolinum pratense Rchb. nom. illeg.; Nezera cathartica (L.) Nieuwl.

= Linum catharticum =

Species of flowering plant

Linum catharticum, also known as purging flax, or fairy flax, is an herbaceous flowering plant in the family Linaceae, native to Great Britain, Iceland, central Europe and Western Asia. It is an annual plant and blooms in July and August.

It is a known host of the pathogenic fungus flax rust (Melampsora lini).
