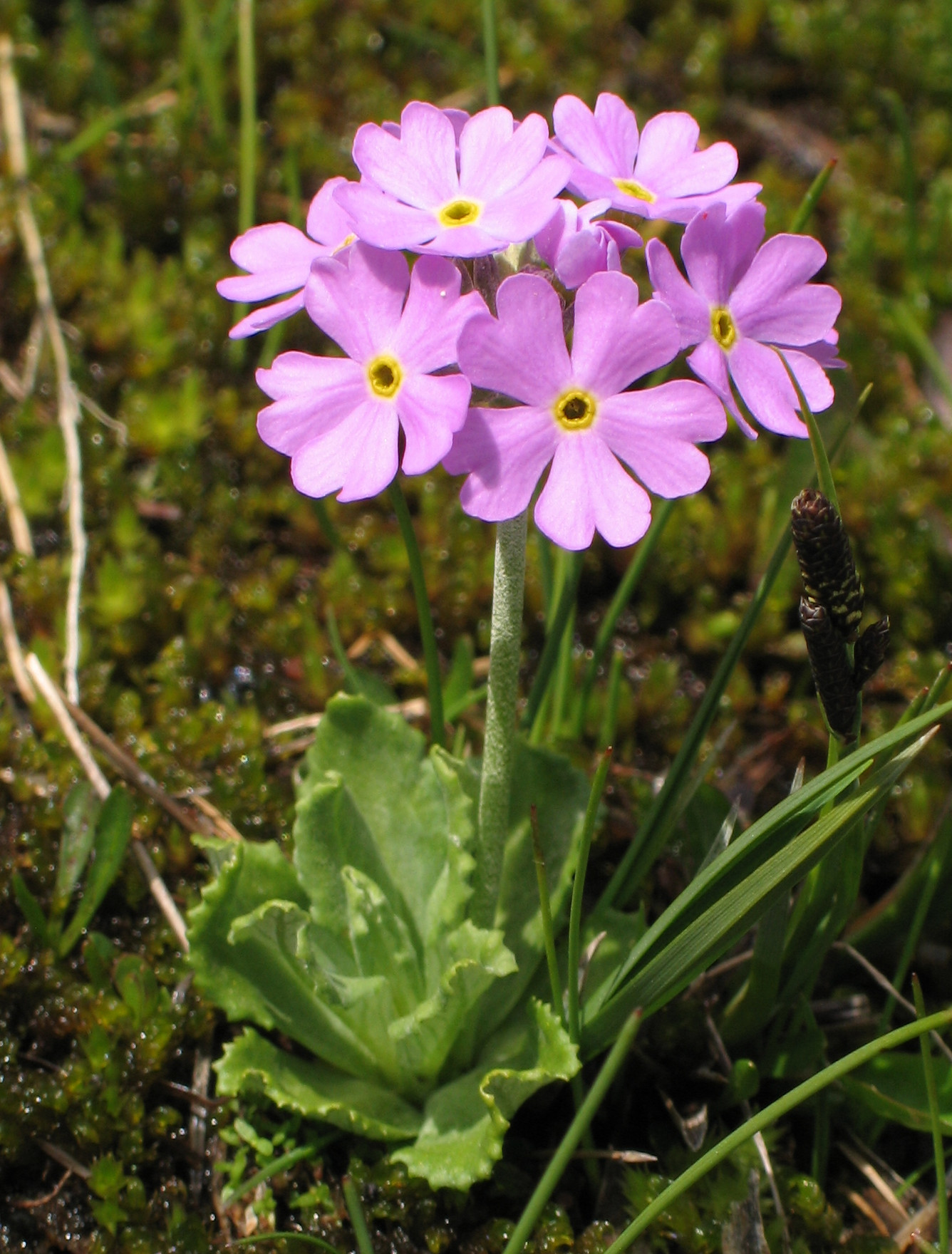
- Between Gebidum Pass and Blausee in Valais, Switzerland

Conservation status
- Least Concern (IUCN 3.1)

Scientific classification
- Kingdom: Plantae
- Clade: Tracheophytes
- Clade: Angiosperms
- Clade: Eudicots
- Clade: Asterids
- Order: Ericales
- Family: Primulaceae
- Genus: Primula
- Species: P. farinosa

Binomial name
- Primula farinosa L.

Synonyms
- List: Aleuritia farinosa; Androsace farinosa; Cankrienia farinosa; Primula altaica; Primula davurica; Primula exaltata; Primula gigantea; Primula lepida; Primula undulata; Primula warei

= Primula farinosa =

Plant species in the primrose family

Primula farinosa, the bird's-eye primrose, is a small perennial plant in the family Primulaceae, native to Northern Europe and further south at high altitudes in the mountains of southern Europe. It is also widespread in northern and central Asia. This primrose thrives on grazed meadows rich in lime and moisture.

== Description ==
Bird's-eye primrose is a herbaceous plant with a flowering stem that may reach 20 centimeters (8 in). However, like all primulas its leaves are all basal, attached directly to the base of the plant. Their leaves can measure 1 to 10 centimeters (0.4 to 3.9 in) long by 3 to 20 millimeters wide. Their shape ranges from oblanceolate to elliptical with a wide angled end and smooth or finely toothed edges. Plants can be farinose, covered in powder, or lack it, but are usually at least farinose on the underside of the leaves. The mealy powder ranges in color from white to sulfur.

The inflorescence it atop a scape, a leafless stem, that will measure 3 to 20 cm tall with two to twenty flowers. The flowers are between 8 and 16 mm in diameter and are usually lilac-pink, but can occasionally be white or purple.

== Taxonomy ==
Primula farinosa was given its scientific name by Linnaeus in 1753. It is classified as part of the genus Primula in the family Primulaceae. It is a diploid species that is most closely related to Primula scotica. It has no recognized subspecies or varieties, but it has 29 synonyms.

Table of Synonyms
Name	Year	Rank	Notes
Aleuritia farinosa (L.) Opiz	1839	species	≡ hom.
Aleuritia farinosa subsp. alpigena (O.Schwarz) Soják	1979	subspecies	= het.
Androsace farinosa (L.) Spreng.	1815	species	≡ hom.
Cankrienia farinosa (L.) Zoll.	1854	species	≡ hom.
Primula altaica Lehm.	1817	species	= het.
Primula davurica Lehm.	1817	species	= het., nom. illeg.
Primula exaltata Lehm.	1817	species	= het.
Primula farinosa f. alba (H.Hara) T.Yamaz.	2003	form	= het.
Primula farinosa subvar. albiflora Druce	1917	subvariety	= het.
Primula farinosa subsp. alpigena O.Schwarz	1968	subspecies	= het.
Primula farinosa var. americana Torr.	1824	variety	= het.
Primula farinosa var. chrysophylla Trautv. & C.A.Mey.	1856	variety	= het.
Primula farinosa var. commutata Behm	1887	variety	= het.
Primula farinosa f. exscapa Wahlenb.	1824	form	= het.
Primula farinosa var. genuina Pax	1888	variety	≡ hom., not validly publ.
Primula farinosa var. koreana T.Yamaz.	2003	variety	= het.
Primula farinosa var. leucophylla Trautv. & C.A.Mey.	1856	variety	= het.
Primula farinosa var. nana E.S.Arnold & A.J.Richards	2002	variety	= het.
Primula farinosa f. nivea (H.Hara) T.Yamaz.	2003	form	= het.
Primula farinosa var. pygmaea Gaudin	1828	variety	= het.
Primula farinosa var. stricta Wahlenb.	1824	variety	= het.
Primula farinosa subsp. xanthophylla (Trautv. & C.A.Mey.) Kitag.	1939	subspecies	= het.
Primula farinosa var. xanthophylla Trautv. & C.A.Mey.	1856	variety	= het.
Primula gigantea Lehm.	1817	species	= het., nom. illeg.
Primula lepida Duby	1844	species	= het.
Primula modesta f. alba H.Hara	1948	form	= het.
Primula modesta f. nivea H.Hara	1948	form	= het.
Primula undulata Fisch. ex Rchb.	1827	species	= het.
Primula warei Stein	1882	species	= het.
Notes: ≡ homotypic synonym; = heterotypic synonym

== Range and habitat ==
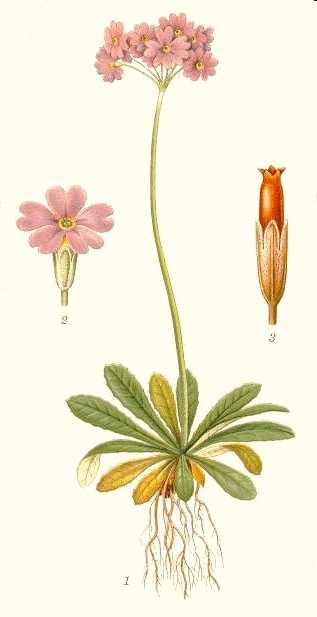
Early 20th century illustration of bird's-eye primrose by botanist Carl Axel Magnus Lindman.

Primula farinosa is widespread in Europe and Asia according to Plants of the World Online. In Europe it is native as far west as Spain, France, and Great Britain. It grows in central and southern Europe including Germany, Switzerland, Italy, Austria, Hungary, Czechia, Slovakia, and Poland. In northern Europe it is found in Denmark, Sweden, Finland, and the Baltic States. It is listed as locally extinct in Czechia by the IUCN. In the southeast it is part of the flora of Croatia, Bulgaria, Romania, and Ukraine. In European Russia it grows in the northwest, north, and east. On the Novaya Zemlya archipelago it reaches 72° N.

In Asia it is native as far south as the central Asian states of Kazakhstan, Kirgizstan, and Tadzhikistan. It grows in all Asian Russia from western Siberia to the Magadan Oblast and the Chukotka Autonomous Okrug. It also grows on the Russian controlled Kuril Islands. To the south it is found in Mongolia and two parts of China, Manchuria and Inner Mongolia.

The species favors alkaline soils and is found in marshes, peatlands, and damp meadows. It tends to be found in mountainous areas.
