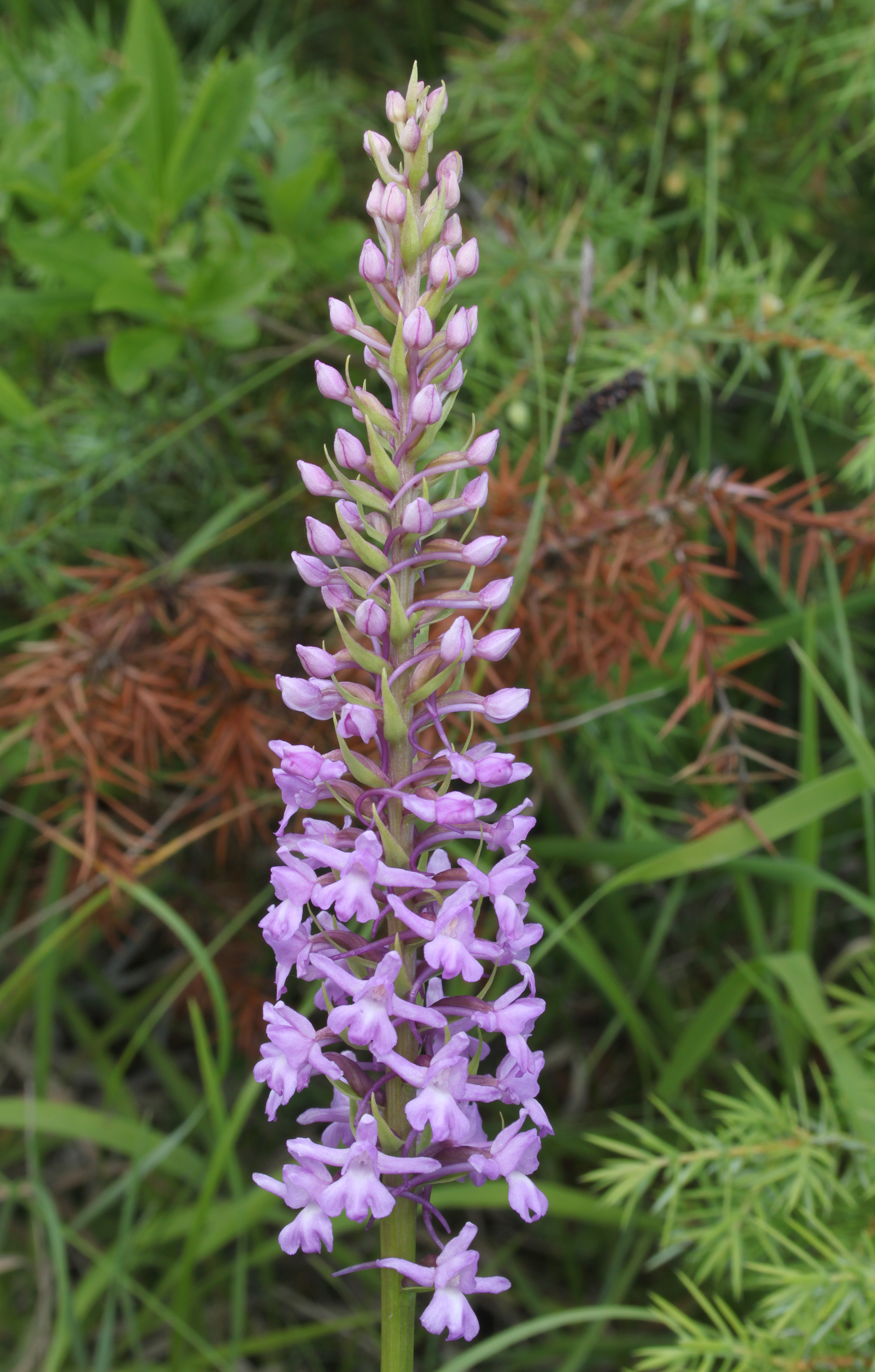

Conservation status
- Least Concern (IUCN 3.1)

Scientific classification
- Kingdom: Plantae
- Clade: Tracheophytes
- Clade: Angiosperms
- Clade: Monocots
- Order: Asparagales
- Family: Orchidaceae
- Subfamily: Orchidoideae
- Genus: Gymnadenia
- Species: G. conopsea

Binomial name
- Gymnadenia conopsea (L.) R.Br.

= Gymnadenia conopsea =

Species of orchid

Gymnadenia conopsea, commonly known as the fragrant orchid or chalk fragrant orchid, is a herbaceous plant of the family Orchidaceae native to northern Europe.

== Etymology ==
The name of the genus Gymnadenia is formed from Greek words γυμνός (gymnós, "nude") and ἀδήν (adēn, "gland") and refers to the characteristics of the organs for secreting nectar. The specific Latin name "conopsea" derives from the Greek κώνωψ (kónops), literally meaning "mosquito-like", probably because of the similarity of the long spur of the flower with the mouthparts of a mosquito.

The scientific binomial name of this plant was initially Orchis conopsea, proposed by the Swedish naturalist and botanist Carl von Linné (1707–1778) in his Species Plantarum of 1753. The name has been subsequently amended to the one currently accepted (Gymnadenia conopsea), by the British botanist Robert Brown (1773–1858) in 1813. In German, this plant is called Mücken-Händelwurz or Mücken Nacktdrüse; in French, is called gymnadénie moucheron or orchis moucheron; in Italy, it is called manina rosea ("pink hand"); in Croatian, it is known under mrežasti vranjak.

== Description ==
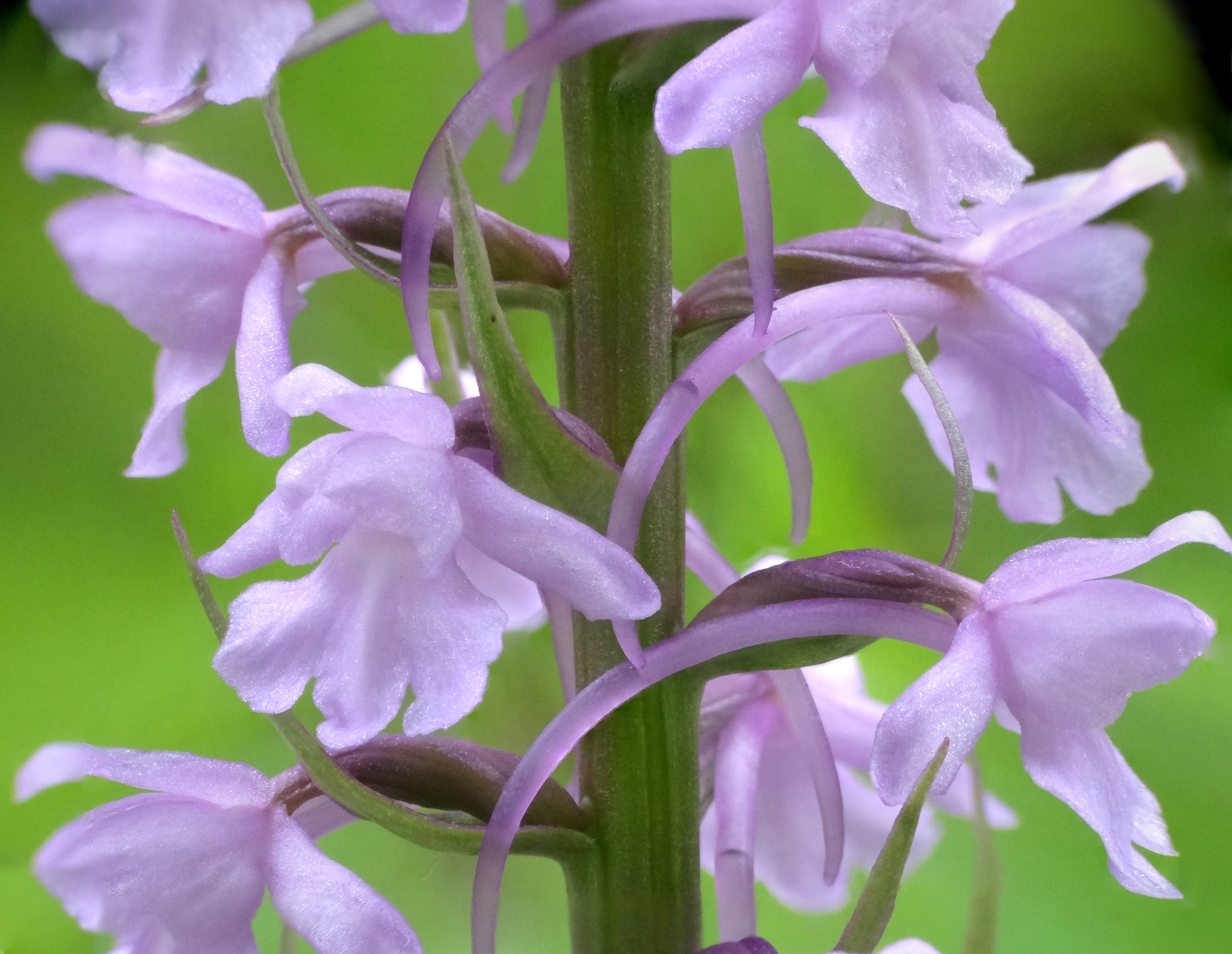
Gymnadenia conopsea flowers with nectar-filled spur

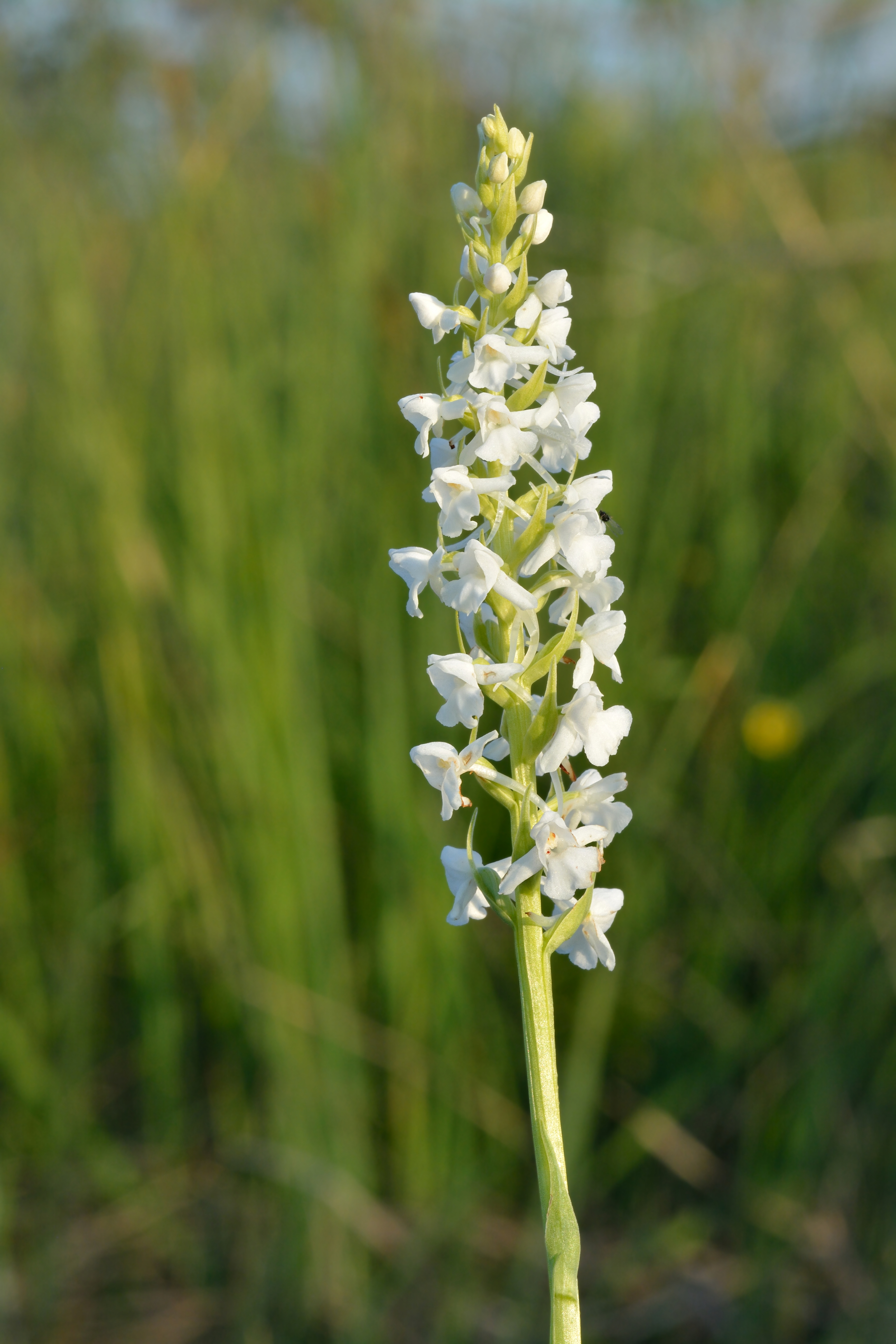
Gymnadenia conopsea var. alba

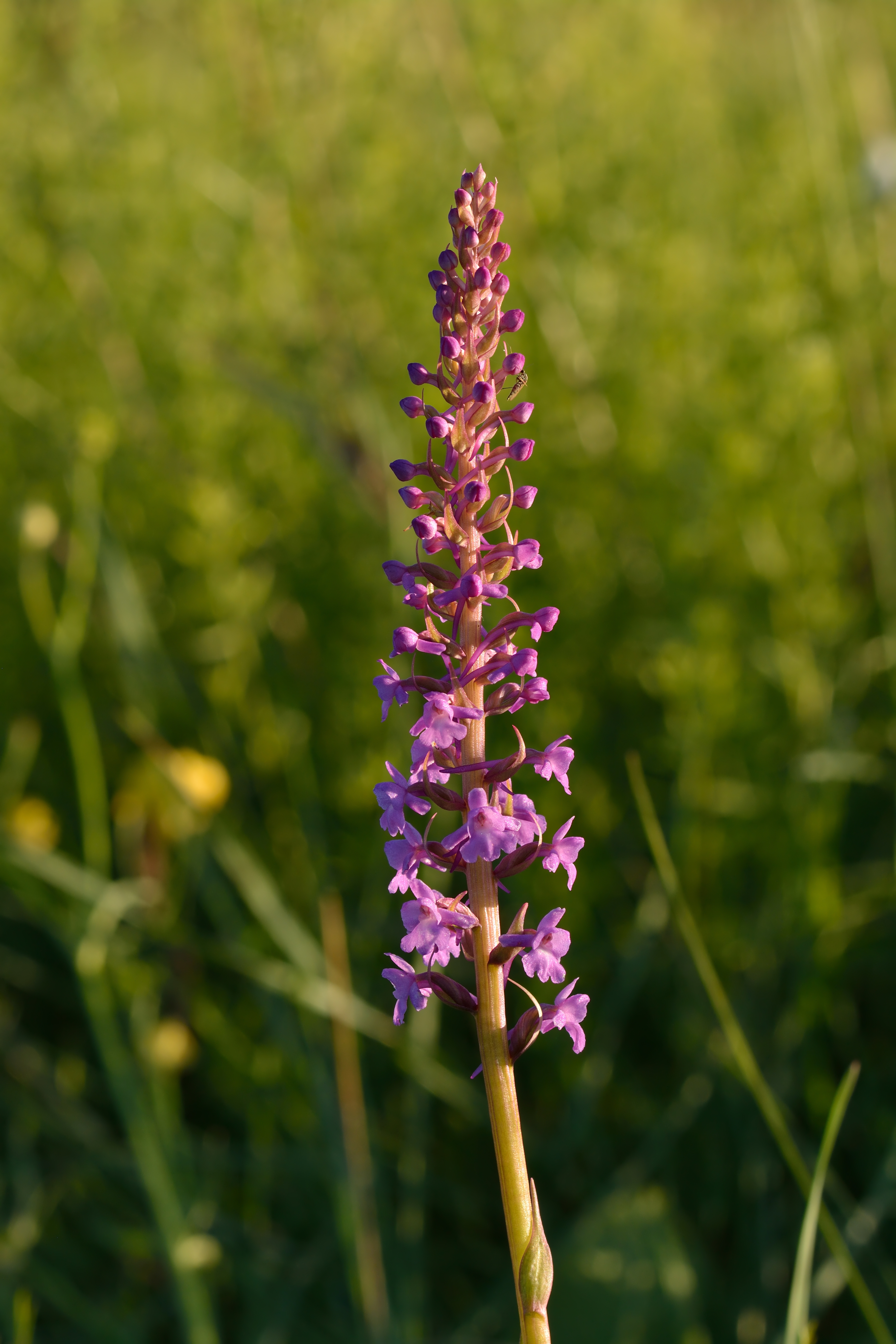
Gymnadenia conopsea

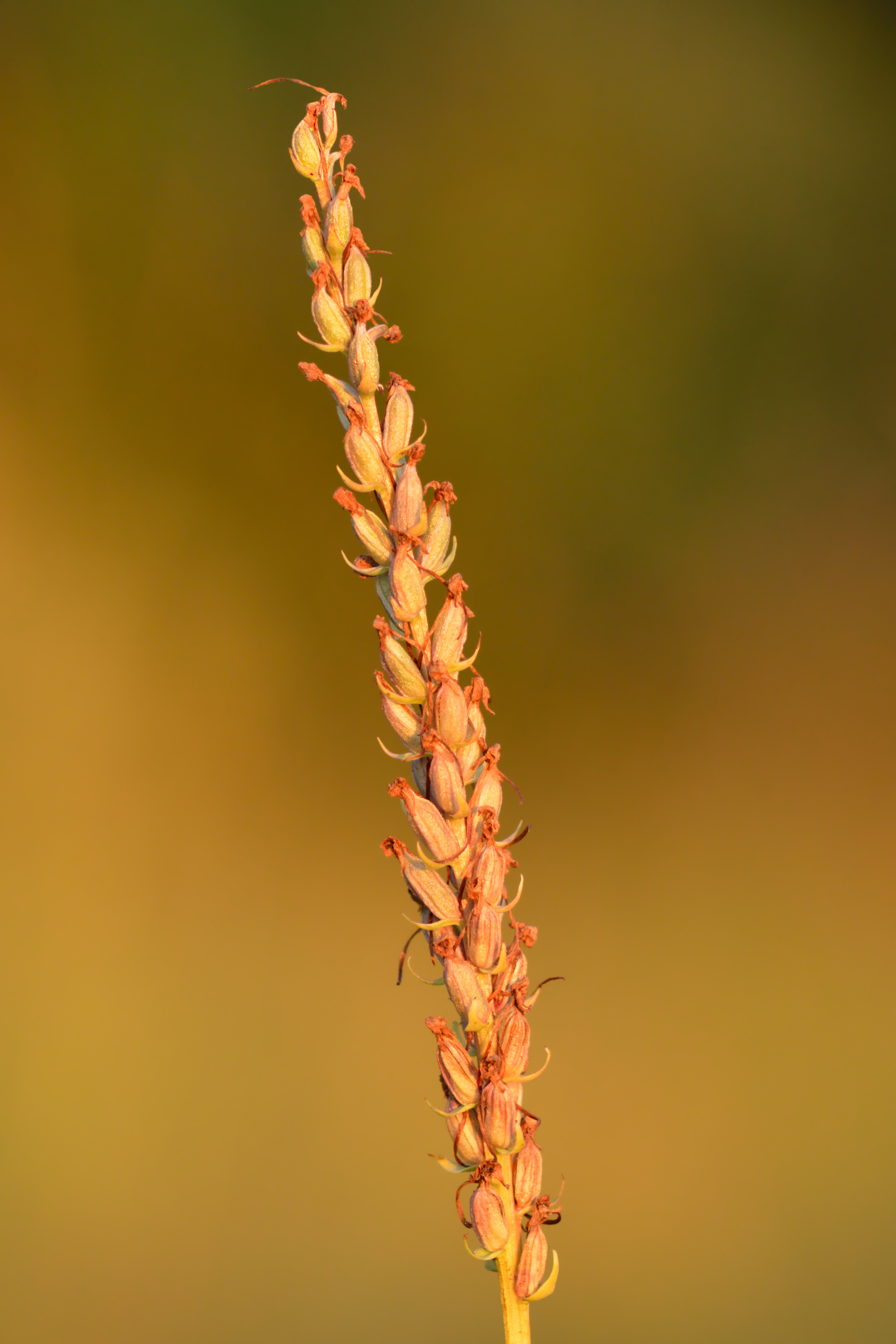
Infructescence

Gymnadenia conopsea reaches on average 20–60 centimetres (7.9–23.6 in) of height, with a maximum of 80 centimetres (31 in). These plants are tuberous geophytes, as they bring their buds in underground tuber, organs that annually produce new stems, leaves and flowers. These orchids are "terrestrial" because unlike "epiphytic" species, they do not grow on other plants of major sizes.

The stem is leafy and robust, with a striated surface. The leaves are long, narrow and lanceolate and vary from 3 to 7. The leaf color is gray-green. Size of leaf: width 1 to 2 cm, length 10 – 25 cm.

These orchids have two ovoidal bulbs, deeply webbed and with many small and short lobes. Size of tubers: 1 to 3.5 cm.

The inflorescence is 5–25 centimetres (2.0–9.8 in) long and it is composed of flowers gathered in dense cylindrical spikes (up to 50 flowers per spike). These inflorescences are scented and genes underlying eugenol (a volatile scent compound) production have been identified in Gymnadenia conopsea, G. odoratissima and G. densiflora. The flowers are petiolated, placed in the axils of long bracts and reach on average 0.8–1.4 centimetres (0.31–0.55 in). They have a distinctive three lobed lip and long spurs. Their light scent is similar to cloves. Their colors vary from white and pink to pink-purple, more rarely white. These flowers bloom in the Summer, from June to July. They are hermaphrodite and pollinated by insects (entomophily), including moths.

== Ecology ==
The species is almost exclusively pollinated by moths (Lepidoptera). The most common pollinators are the small elephant hawk-moth (Deilephila porcellus), hummingbird hawk-moth (Macroglossum stellatarum), silver Y (Autographa gamma), burnished brass (Diachrysia chrysitis) and large yellow underwing (Noctua pronuba). Fruit set is high with an average of 73%.

The seed's germination is conditioned by the presence of mycorrhizal fungi. Gymnadenia conopsea is held to be a mycorrhizal generalist, able to form associations with a variety of different fungal species including species in the Tulasnellaceae, Ceratobasidiaceae and Pezizales.

== Distribution ==
This plant is quite common throughout northern Europe with the exception of the Dinaric Alps. In Asia it is common in areas to the north of the Himalayas. Gymnadenia conopsea ssp. borealis has been recorded from Co. Donegal, Ireland in 2004.

== Habitat ==
This species' habitat includes mountain meadows and pastures, grassland and fens. They grow on siliceous and calcareous substrate, mildly damp and with low nutritional value, at an altitude of 0–2,400 metres (0–7,874 ft) above sea level.

== Subspecies ==
- Gymnadenia conopsea subsp. conopsea
- Gymnadenia conopsea subsp. montana Bisse

== Synonyms ==
- Gymnadenia alpina (Turcz. ex Rchb.f.) Czerep. 1981
- Gymnadenia anisoloba Peterm. 1849
- Gymnadenia comigera Rchb. 1830
- Gymnadenia gracillima Schur 1871
- Gymnadenia ibukiensis Makino 1912
- Gymnadenia orchidis var. pantlingii Renz 2001
- Gymnadenia ornithis Rich. 1818
- Gymnadenia pseudoconopsea Gren. Rouy 1912
- Gymnadenia pyrenaica Giraudias 1882
- Gymnadenia sibirica Turcz. ex Lindl. 1835
- Gymnadenia splendida Dworschak 2002
- Gymnadenia splendida subsp. odorata Dworschak 2002
- Gymnadenia transsilvanica Schur 1866
- Gymnadenia vernalis Dworschak 2002
- Gymnadenia wahlenbergii Afzel. ex Rchb.f. 1851
- Habenaria conopsea (L.) Benth. (1880)
- Habenaria gymnadenia Druce 1897
- Orchis conopea Gras 1862
- Orchis conopsea L. 1753
- Orchis cornopica Mill. 1768
- Orchis ornithis Jacq. 1774
- Orchis peloria Foucault ex Poir. 1816
- Orchis pseudoconopea Gren. 1869
- Orchis pseudo-conopsea Gren. 1865
- Orchis pseudoconopsea J.Parm. 1894
- Orchis setacea Gilib. 1792
- Orchis suaveolens Salisb. 1796
- Satyrium conopseum (L.) Wahlenb. 1826
