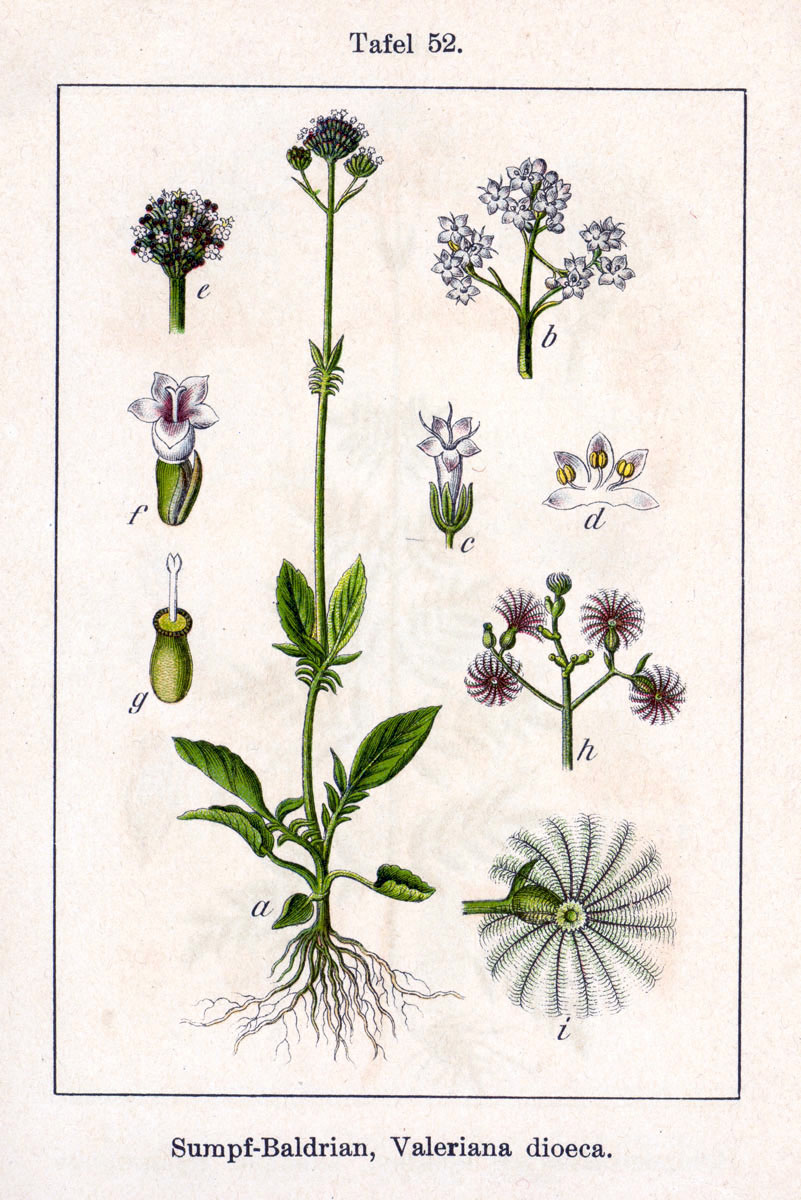
- Botanical illustration
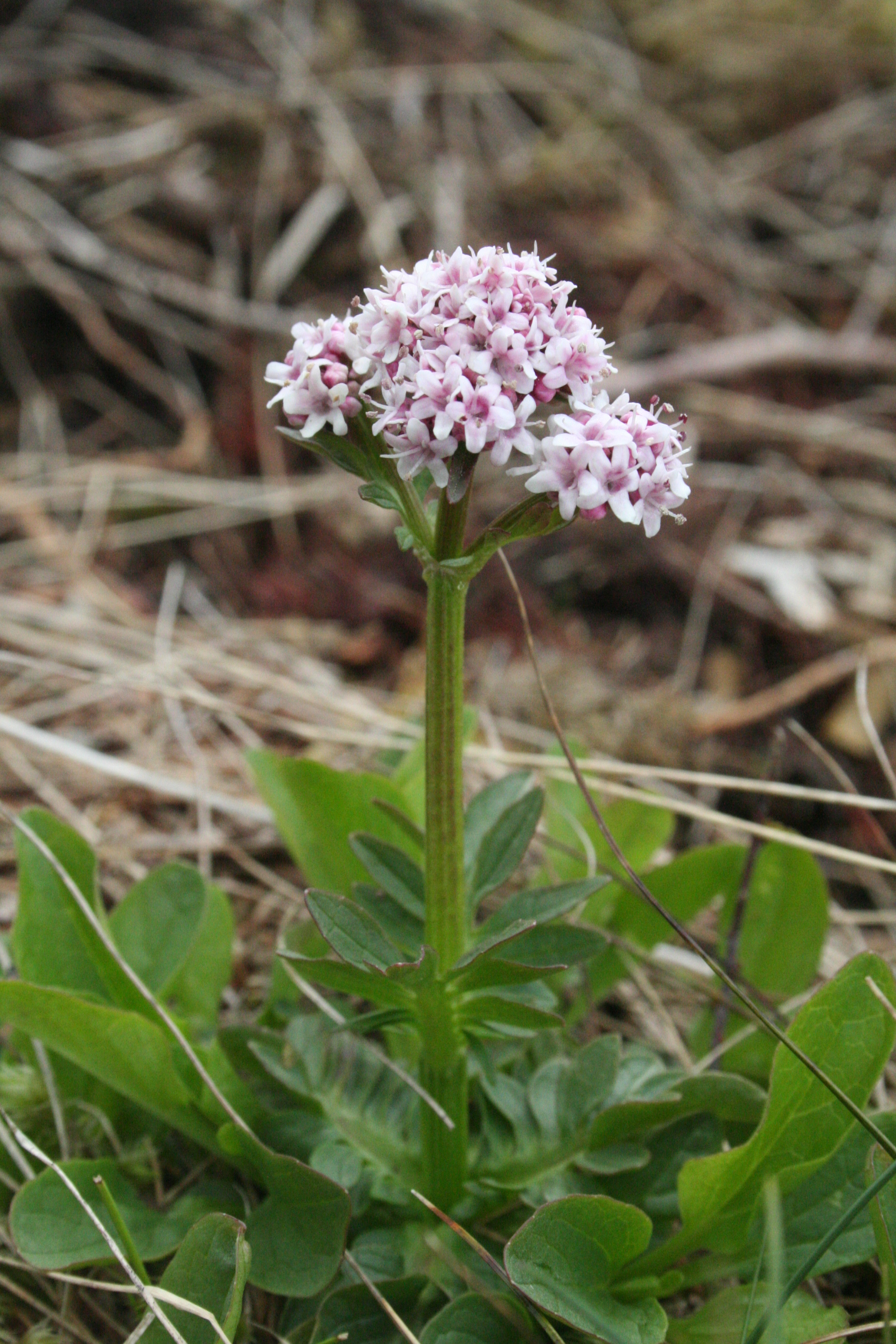
- In bloom

Conservation status
- Least Concern (IUCN 3.1)

Scientific classification
- Kingdom: Plantae
- Clade: Embryophytes
- Clade: Tracheophytes
- Clade: Spermatophytes
- Clade: Angiosperms
- Clade: Eudicots
- Clade: Asterids
- Order: Dipsacales
- Family: Caprifoliaceae
- Genus: Valeriana
- Species: V. dioica

Binomial name
- Valeriana dioica L.

Synonyms
- List: Valeriana affinis Opiz; Valeriana compacta Opiz; Valeriana dioica subsp. sylvatica (S.Watson) F.G.Mey.; Valeriana exigua Bubani; Valeriana micrantha var. wyomingensis (E.E.Nelson) A.Nelson; Valeriana nasturtiifolia Lag. ex Willk. & Lange; Valeriana palustris Garsault; Valeriana psilodes Gand.; Valeriana pusilla Royle; Valeriana septentrionalis Rydb.; Valeriana subdentata Opiz ex Mert. & W.D.J.Koch; Valeriana sylvatica F.W.Schmidt; Valeriana sylvestris Gray; Valeriana wyomingensis E.E.Nelson

= Valeriana dioica =

Species of flowering plant

Valeriana dioica, the marsh valerian, is a species of flowering plant in the family Caprifoliaceae, native to North America, Europe and Anatolia. It is typically found in calcareous fens. It is a dioecious species, with male and female flowers on separate individuals, and it is pollinated by small flies.

== Varieties ==
The following varieties are currently accepted:

- Valeriana dioica var. dioica
- Valeriana dioica var. sylvatica S.Watson – northern North America
