= List of traffic collisions (before 2000) =

This list of traffic collisions records serious road crashes: those that have a large death toll, occurred in unusual circumstances, or have some other historical significance. For crashes that killed notable people, refer to List of people who died in traffic collisions. The prevalence of bus crashes in this list is a function of severity rather than of frequency. This list records crashes up to the year 1999. For later crashes see: List of traffic collisions (2000–present).

Notable historic road crashes
1950s:	1950	1951	1952	1953	1954	1955	1956	1957	1958	1959
1960s:	1960	1961	1962	1963	1964	1965	1966	1967	1968	1969
1970s:	1970	1971	1972	1973	1974	1975	1976	1977	1978	1979
1980s:	1980	1981	1982	1983	1984	1985	1986	1987	1988	1989
1990s:	1990	1991	1992	1993	1994	1995	1996	1997	1998	1999
See also — References — External links

== 1700s ==
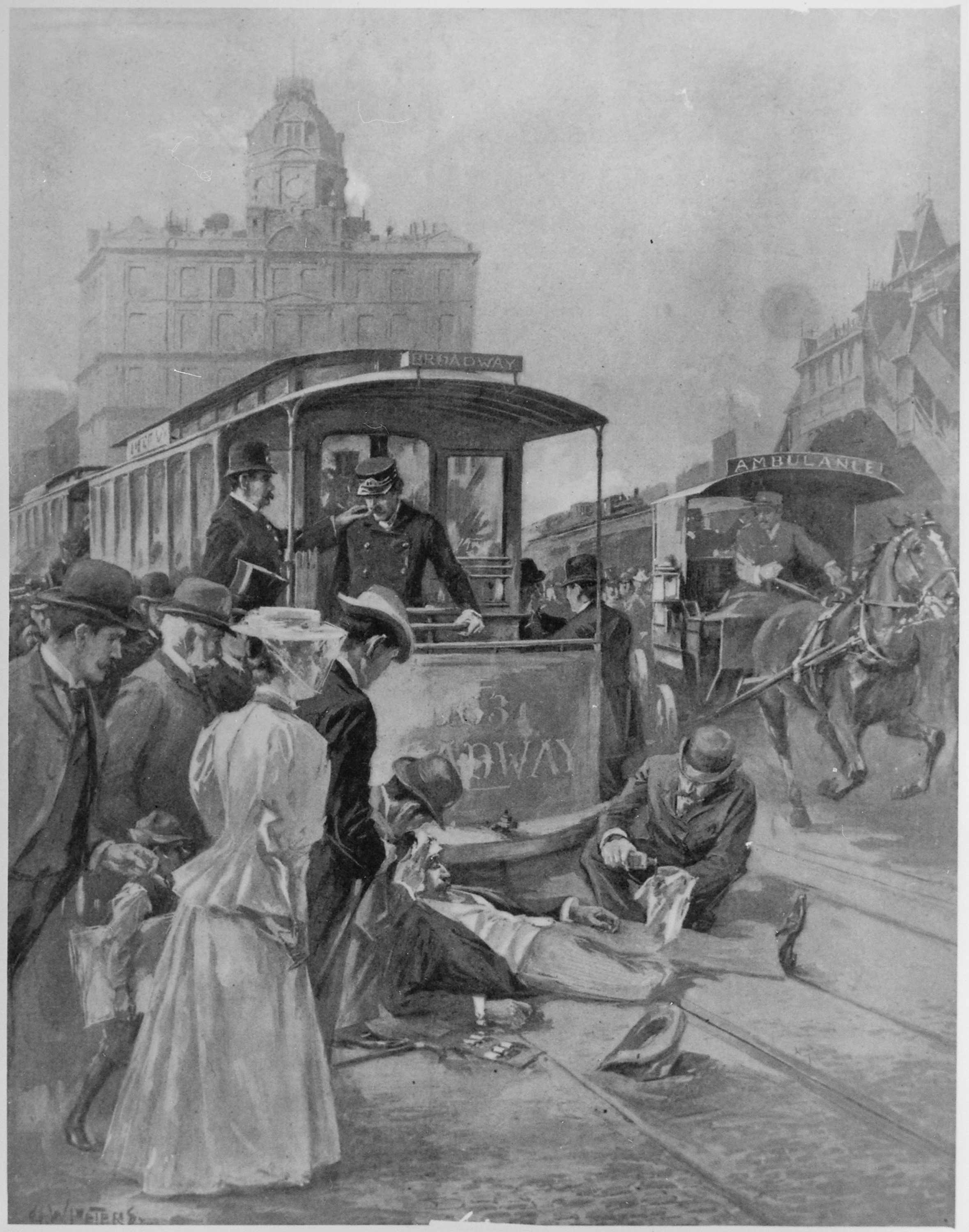
"A Typical Cable 'Accident' on Broadway.", ca. 29 August 1895

- 1771 – France – Nicolas-Joseph Cugnot's second steam-powered vehicle is said to have crashed into a wall during a test run, in what would have been the first automobile crash. However, it is disputed that this ever happened. According to Georges Ageon, the earliest mention of this occurrence dates from 1801 and it does not feature in contemporary accounts.

== 1800s ==
- July 1834 – Scotland – A steam carriage constructed by John Scott Russell, which was operating a public transport service between Glasgow and Paisley, overturned after hitting an obstruction in the road. This caused a boiler explosion which killed five passengers and injured others. Russell's carriage comprised a self-propelling steam engine pulling a combined passenger and fuel tender.
- August 31, 1869 – Ireland – While riding as a passenger with relatives in an experimental steam car, Mary Ward was thrown from the car and fell under the wheels as it rounded a bend. Her death may be characterized as the first fatality involving a vehicle in the form of a contemporary motorcar, in which the engine is mounted and passengers ride on the same frame. It took place in the town of Birr, which was known at that time as Parsonstown. The car was built by her cousins, the sons of William Parsons, 3rd Earl of Rosse.
- 1891 – United States – John William Lambert was involved in the first recorded automobile crash in American history. The crash occurred in Ohio City, Ohio. The vehicle was the first American single-cylinder gasoline automobile, known as the Buckeye gasoline buggy or the Lambert gasoline buggy, and was made in Ohio in 1891. It was carrying Lambert and James Swoveland when it hit a tree root, causing the car to careen out of control and crash into a hitching post. Injuries were minor.
- August 17, 1896 – United Kingdom – Death of Bridget Driscoll. Bridget Driscoll was the first person to die in a petrol-engined car crash, and the first pedestrian victim of an automobile crash in the United Kingdom. As she crossed the grounds of The Crystal Palace in London, she was struck by an automobile belonging to the Anglo-French Motor Carriage Company that was being used to give demonstration rides.
- February 25, 1899 – United Kingdom – Edwin Sewell and Major Richer were thrown from their vehicle on Harrow on the Hill, Middlesex, and killed. Sewell's death is the first recorded fatality of a driver.
- September 13, 1899 – United States – Henry H. Bliss was the first person killed by a car in the United States. He was struck by an electric-powered taxicab while exiting the 8th Avenue trolley on West 74th Street and Central Park West in New York City.

== 1900s ==
- July 12, 1906 – United Kingdom – Handcross Hill bus crash. A bus full of people from Orpington and St Mary Cray was travelling to Brighton for a day trip when the gearbox shattered and the bus ran into a tree near Handcross, killing 10 and injuring 26.

== 1920s ==
- June 10, 1925 – United Kingdom – Dibbles Bridge coach crash. A tour coach ran away following brake failure and fell off a bridge near Hebden, North Yorkshire whilst en route to Bolton Abbey, killing seven passengers.

== 1930s ==
- August 29, 1935 – Belgium – Queen Astrid of Belgium is killed in a car crash in Küssnacht am Rigi, near Lake Lucerne, Schwyz, Switzerland. She was riding in a Packard One-Twenty driven by her husband King Leopold III when it went off the road and crashed into a pear tree.
- March 25, 1937 – United States – A bus carrying a roller derby team crashed just west of Salem, Illinois, killing 21 of the 23 people on the bus.
- April 4, 1939 – Iraq – King Ghazi of Iraq is killed in a car crash in Baghdad.

== 1940s ==
- October 1941 – United Kingdom – A Royal Air Force bus crashes into a lorry and catches fire near Cheltenham, Gloucestershire, killing 9 airmen and injuring 13.
- June 1944 – United Kingdom – A British Army lorry crashes into a house in Burley in Wharfedale, Yorkshire, killing 19 soldiers.
- October 1944 – United Kingdom – A United States Army bus collides with a lorry near Marlborough, Wiltshire, killing 10 soldiers and injuring 21.
- August 1946 – United States – 2 cars collided head-on on U.S. Route 30, 27 miles northwest of Portland, Oregon, killing 5 people and injuring 2.
- October 1947 – United Kingdom – A bus crashes into a building in Holmfirth, Yorkshire, killing 9 people.
- January 1948 – United Kingdom – A bus skidded into a bus queue in Bargeddie, near Glasgow, Scotland, killing eight people and injuring 12.
- November 24, 1948 – Sweden – A trolleybus on line 96 collided with a truck, which loaded with concrete slabs that were heading in the opposite direction. The bus drove off Essingebron in Stockholm and 11 people died.

== 1950s ==
=== 1950 ===
- February 11 – Japan – A Takase-Kumamoto Kyūshū Sanko regular route bus plunges into a pond 40 feet (12 m) below at Matsuo, Kumamoto, Kyūshū, killing 22 people and injuring 18.
- May – United Kingdom – A bus and a tram collide in Glasgow, killing eight people and injuring 43.
- November 7 – Japan – A regular route bus plunges 240 feet (73 m) into the Mononobe river, Mirabu, eastern Kōchi Prefecture, Shikoku, killing 33 people and injuring 24.

=== 1951 ===
- July 15 – Japan – A Shimokawai-Chubutenryu regular route bus plunges off the Harada bridge, Tenryū River, Urakawa, Hokkaidō, northwestern Shizuoka Prefecture, killing 24.
- December 4 – United Kingdom – Gillingham bus disaster. During an evening march in a badly-lit area, a double-decker bus struck a company of fifty-two young members of the Royal Marines Volunteer Cadet Corps, aged between ten and thirteen years. 24 cadets were killed and 18 injured; at the time it was the greatest loss of life of any road crash in British history. The crash was ruled accidental.

=== 1954 ===
- September 29 – Netherlands – The brakes and gear box of a Belgian tourist bus fail on the downhill slope of the Cauberg, near Valkenburg aan de Geul, hitting a pedestrian, then a monument and a building. 19 people were killed.
- November 12 – Réunion – The brakes of a bus failed on the downhill slope of Plateau-Caillou in Saint-Paul. 54 people were killed.

=== 1955 ===
- September 30 – United States - Death of James Dean. The death of Hollywood actor James Dean occurred near Cholame, California. Dean had previously competed in several auto racing events, and was traveling to a sports car racing competition when his Porsche 550 Spyder collided with another car at the junction of California State Route 46 (former 466) and California State Route 41. He was 24 years old.

=== 1957 ===
- April 27 – Soviet Union – 33 people were killed when a bus collided with a train in Chelyabinsk Oblast.
- June 6 – United States – An early morning collision occurred 7 mi (11 km) north of Fayetteville, North Carolina, where a flat bed truck packed with migrant workers pulled in front of a tractor-trailer hauling potatoes. It killed 21 people. At the time, it is the worst traffic fatality accident in U.S. history.
- November 10 – 1957 Saint-Paul bus accident – The brakes of a bus ruptured on an incline, causing 27 deaths.

=== 1958 ===
- February 28 – United States – Prestonsburg, Kentucky, bus crash. A school bus in Floyd County, Kentucky hit a wrecker truck on US 23 and plunged down an embankment into the rain-swollen Levisa Fork River. The driver and 26 children died in the worst school bus crash in U.S. history.
- December 22 – Greece – A suburban bus from Ioannina to Chouliarades carrying 34 people failed to complete a manoeuvre on the steep road near the village of Petrovouni, Ioannina. It subsequently fell down the 350m slope to Arachthos gorge, killing 29 people, seven of whom were minors.

=== 1959 ===
- June 20 – West Germany – Lauffen bus crash. A crowded bus collided with a train on a level crossing in Lauffen am Neckar, killing 45 people. It was the worst bus crash in German history.
- September 10 – United States – A school bus stalled on railroad tracks in Oakland, Maryland, was hit by a train, killing seven children and injuring 11.

== 1960s ==
=== 1960 ===
- July 24 – Japan – A charter bus collides with a regular route bus, the charter bus plunging 270 ft (80 m) into a valley along the toll road of Mount Hiei, Ōtsu, Shiga, killing 30 people and injuring another 18.
- September 14 – Greece – A truck struck a suburban bus which subsequently crashed into an olive tree between Athens and Corinth, killing 11 people.
- November 29 – Canada – 17 high schoolers from the town of Chipman, Alberta died after a school bus was hit by a train near Lamont, Alberta. An additional 25 people were injured.

=== 1961 ===
- December 14 – United States – 20 schoolchildren were killed in a bus-train collision in Evans, Colorado. The bus driver had stopped at the rural track but did not see or hear the train arriving. The bus had almost passed over the track when it was struck.

=== 1962 ===
- June 11 – Argentina – Villa Soldati level crossing tragedy. A train struck a municipal bus in Buenos Aires whilst it was carrying school children to kindergarten. Forty-two children were killed and 83 were injured.

=== 1963 ===
- February 7 – New Zealand – Brynderwyn bus accident. A bus in Northland Region leaves the road after brake failure and rolls down a valley, killing 15 people, and becomes the worst road crash in New Zealand history up to that time.
- April 7 – Kenya – A bus returning from a church meeting plunged into the Tiva River, Mitaboni, Machakos, killing at least 72 people.
- May 18 – United States – A bus carrying 42 migrant agricultural workers crashed into a canal in Belle Glade, Florida, killing 27 people.
- June 10 – United States – An open truck carrying 49 Boy Scouts and leaders stalls while climbing a hill en route to Hole in the Rock, Utah. It loses its brakes and plunges into Carcass Wash, killing 13 people.
- September 17 – United States – Chualar bus crash. In the worst auto accident in U.S. history, a train hit a flatbed truck used as a bus at a rail crossing in Chualar, California, killing 32 people and injuring 25.

=== 1965 ===
- January 1 – Peru – A Huancayo-Ayacucho regular route bus plunges 300 ft (90 m) into a ravine of the Mantaro River, killing 31 people.
- January 10 – Mexico – A bus carrying soccer players and their families plunges 450 ft (140 m) into a ravine on the outskirts of Dolores Hidalgo, Guanajuato, killing 19 people and injuring 22.
- February 3 – Mexico – A regular route bus plunges 300 ft (90 m) off a cliff along the Mexico-Ciudad Juárez expressway on the outskirts of Zacatecas, killing 25 people and injuring 40.
- February 10 – Egypt – A truck carrying 66 people plunged into a canal on the outskirts of El Ayyat, killing 36 people. The truck driver is arrested on suspicion of driving without a license.
- February 18 – Italy – A Naples-Salerno regular route bus plunges 15 m (50 ft) into a ravine on the Naples-Pompeii expressway near Mount Vesuvius, killing 17 people and injuring 60.
- March 2 – Austria – 12 Swedish schoolchildren and two Finnish girls on winter sports holiday were killed when the bus they were traveling in was swept away in an avalanche in Obertauern.
- November 1 – Egypt – A crowded trolley bus plunges into the Nile on the outskirts of Dokki, Giza, killing 74 people.
- December 6 – Togo – Two trucks crashed into a crowd of dancers in Sotouboua. 125 people were killed.

=== 1966 ===
- June 17 – USSR – 1966 Mamontovka crash. 74 people were killed when a bus plunged into a pond in Mamontovka, Moscow Oblast.
- July 25 – West Germany – A bus carrying Belgian children on vacation plunges off an Autobahn bridge and crashes on its roof. 33 people were killed, including 27 children and the driver who fell asleep at the wheel. Only 4 people survived.
- October 7 – Canada – Dorion level crossing crash. 19 people were killed when a school bus was hit by a CN Rail freight train in Vaudreuil-Dorion, Quebec.

=== 1967 ===
- July 6 – German Democratic Republic – In the Langenweddingen level crossing disaster, a passenger train hits a fuel tanker, which explodes. 94 people die.
- December 15 – United States – The Silver Bridge linking Point Pleasant, West Virginia, and Gallipolis, Ohio, collapses into the Ohio River under heavy traffic, killing 46 people.

=== 1968 ===
- August 18 – Japan – Hidagawa bus crash. During intense rain, two charter buses crash into the Hida River on national highway route 41 in Gero, Gifu Prefecture, killing 104 people.

=== 1969 ===
- June 6 – Philippines – A regular route bus navigating a sharp descending curve on a narrow mountain road near Baler, Quezon, plunged into a ravine and burst into flames. Forty people were killed and 32 were injured.
- June 21 – Syria – An overcrowded vehicle carrying 35 workers crashed at Maharda, Al-Amam, killing 25 people.
- July 18 – United States – Chappaquiddick incident. Mary Jo Kopechne was killed when a car driven by US Senator Ted Kennedy crashed off the Dike Bridge on Chappaquiddick Island, Massachusetts. A political scandal ensued.

== 1970s ==
=== 1970 ===
- September 27 – South Korea – A regular route bus plunged off a mountain cliff on the outskirts of Myongju, South Gyeongsang Province, killing 15 people and injuring 20.
- November 22 – Argentina – A bus plunged into a creek on the outskirts of Reconquista, Santa Fe, killing 56 people and leaving 4 survivors.

=== 1971 ===
- May 10 – South Korea – At least 75 people drowned when a bus carrying nearly 90 passengers plunged into a reservoir near Cheongpyeong.
- September 17 – Spain – In Valdepeñas a truck carrying three tons of bricks crashed into a French Coach bus, killing 18, including 17 Quebecer tourists.

=== 1972 ===
- March 22 – United States – Gilchrest Road, New York crossing accident. Five high school students were killed and 44 injured when a Penn Central train hit a school bus that failed to stop at a crossing. This incident caused the State of New York to require school vehicles to stop at all railroad crossings.
- May 13 – United States – Bean Station bus-truck collision. Fourteen people were killed in a head-on collision between a double-decker Greyhound bus and a tractor-trailer on U.S. Route 11W near Bean Station, Tennessee. One of the deadliest crashes in Tennessee history, it led to the completion of Interstate 81 and the widening of many highways in the state from two lanes to four.
- June 25 – Spain – A bus carrying soccer fans home from a game plunged into a ravine near Cáceres, killing 22 and injuring 34.
- August 25 – Netherlands – Many cars and trucks collided in sudden dense fog on the A16 motorway near Prinsenbeek, killing 13. A fog warning system was installed after this crash, however a similar crash occurred 18 years later.
- September 23 – Japan – An Akakura-Togakushi regular route bus carrying 82 passengers plunged from a single-lane road into a ravine in Shinano, Nagano. 15 people were killed and 67 were injured.

=== 1973 ===
- July 18 – France – A bus carrying Belgian tourists plunged into a ravine in Vizille, killing 43 people.
- September 26 – Australia – A tourist bus carrying pensioners on a sightseeing trip plunged over the Tumut Pond Dam, killing 18 and injuring 21.
- November 4 – United States – A bus carrying gamblers to Reno, Nevada crashed into a pillar five miles north of Sacramento, California, killing 13 and injuring 31.
- November 20 – Mexico – An overcrowded bus carrying religious pilgrims skidded off a road and plunged into a ravine 50 miles southwest of Mexico City, killing at least 15 and injuring 43. A further 10 were reported missing. Most of the passengers were children.

=== 1974 ===
- January 15 – United States – Blythe, California bus crash. A bus carrying farm laborers missed a ninety-degree turn on an intersection and fell into a drainage canal, killing 19.
- July 5 – Finland – Laukaan linja-autoturma: A bus carrying Dutch tourists collided with a truck in Laukaa, killing 12 people and injuring 18.
- July 28 – Brazil – A crowded bus and a truck collided near Belém, killing 69 people.
- July 30 – United States – A 1972 Oldsmobile station wagon, occupied by four children and four adults, collided with a Soo Line freight train at the Fibre Crossing, which did not have lights or gates installed. All eight were killed.
- June 1 – Canada – A bus carrying 44 passengers veered off the road into a ravine in Les Éboulements, Quebec, killing 14 people.

=== 1975 ===
- January 1 – Japan – A charter bus carrying 62 passengers plunged 100 ft (30 m) into Aoki Lake, Ōmachi, Nagano, killing 24 people.
- April 2 – France – A bus carrying religious pilgrims suffered a brake failure and plunged off a bridge near Vizille, killing 27 and injuring 16.
- May 27 – United Kingdom – Dibbles Bridge coach crash. A bus full of pensioners falls off a bridge near Hebden, North Yorkshire, killing 32 people and injuring 13.
- June 15 – Austria – A tour bus carrying pensioners suffered a brake failure and went over an embankment into a ravine near Villach, killing 21 and injuring 23 in Austria's worst bus disaster.
- December 12 – Canada – A GO Transit train strikes a bus on a level crossing in Toronto killing 10 and injuring a further 20.

=== 1976 ===
- February 16 – Sweden – The worst traffic accident in Sweden occurred outside Axamo, Jönköping. Overheated tires caused a bus fire, killing 15 and injuring 28.
- May 21 – United States – Yuba City bus disaster. A bus carrying the Yuba City High School a cappella choir fell off Interstate 680 in California, killing 28 students and a teacher. This was the second deadliest bus crash in U.S. history, after the 1963 Chualar bus crash.
- August 10 – United Kingdom – 1976 Andersonstown incident. Two members of the Provisional Irish Republican Army who were trying to escape British soldiers in a Ford Cortina, the passenger of the Cortina, John Chillingworth pointed a broken gun at the soldiers and the soldiers opened fire killing the car’s driver, Danny Lennon (23). The car then jumped the curb and crashed into a family of five, killing Andrew Maguire (6 weeks), Joanne Maguire (8) who died instantly and John Maguire (2) who died the next day. The children’s mother Anne Maguire (31) was critically injured and took her own life years later, and Mark Maguire (7) who was uninjured in the incident.
- August 22 – Brazil – Former president Juscelino Kubitschek was killed when his car crashed into a truck on the Dutra Highway. His driver was also killed.
- December 21 – France – A school bus carrying mentally handicapped children returning from the Édouard Séguin Children Medical Center plunged into the River Rhône on the outskirts of Lyon, killing at least 13 people.

=== 1977 ===
- June 9 – Russia – A truck crashes into a crowd at a downtown Moscow bus stop, killing eight people and injuring 18.
- August 11 – Japan – A charter bus plunged 120 ft (37 m) into a ravine at Nagatoro bridge, Kōfu, Yamanashi Prefecture, killing 11 people and injuring 39.
- September 3 - Canada - Two trucks and a bus collide in Lantzville, British Columbia, killing 10 people.

=== 1978 ===
- January 22 – Poland – Katastrofa autobusu koło Osiecznicy. Soviet Army truck loaded with parts of a pontoon bridge collided with crowded bus, killing 15 people and injuring 14.
- July 11 – Spain – Los Alfaques disaster. In La Ràpita, a tank truck containing 45 m³ of liquefied propylene left the road and veered into the Los Alfaques camping site after colliding with a building. The resulting fire ball was more than 100 meters in diameter and killed at least 215 people (some sources speak of 216 or even 270), and injured 200.
- August 4 – Canada – the Eastman Bus Crash occurred when a bus carrying mentally handicapped people plunged into a lake in Eastman, Quebec, killing 40 people. Only seven people survived.
- November 15 – Poland – Katastrofa drogowa pod Żywcem. Two buses with miners going to work plunged into the river Jezioro Żywieckie near Żywiec, killing 33 people.
- December 21 – Spain – A school bus was struck by a locomotive on a level crossing near Salamanca, killing 28 and injuring 36.

=== 1979 ===
- April 10 – Spain – A bus carrying pupils from a trip to Madrid and Toledo plunged into a river near Benavente, killing 50 of the 60 people aboard.
- June 2 – South Korea – A bus collided with a truck and plunged into a river near Sarnchok, killing around 20 and injuring 20.
- June 9 - Canada - A bus carrying seniors lost control during a rainstorm and crashed into an overpass near Sainte-Rosalie, Quebec killing 11 seniors and injuring another 20.
- August 16 – Yugoslavia – A bus collided with a truck and plunged into a river near Novi Sad killing 14 and injuring 40.

== 1980s ==
=== 1980 ===
- March 3 – Soviet Union – A city bus 62 caught fire in Minsk after driving into a pool of gasoline spilled from a fuel truck, burning 23 people to death.
- May 9 – United States – Sunshine Skyway Bridge disaster. In Tampa, Florida, a cargo ship collided with a bridge pier, demolishing over 1200 ft. of the bridge and killing 35 people.
- June 5 – United States – A tour bus rolled off the highway near Jasper, Arkansas, killing 22 people and injuring 19.
- June 29 – Pakistan – A bus carrying more than 100 women and children plunged into a canal in Upper Jhelam, near Mirpur, Azad Kashmir, and at least 90 people drowned as a result.
- June 29 – Romania – Huțani bus accident. A bus carrying 83 people went off a bridge and overturned into a deep marsh near Huțani, a village in Vlădeni, Botoșani, killing 48 people and injuring 35.

=== 1981 ===
- April 26 – Mexico – A head-on collision of a bus and a truck near Tijuana killed 30 people and injured 10 to 15.
- May 22 – Mexico – A head-on collision of a bus and a truck in Chiapas state killed 33 people.
- September 29 – Spain – A head-on collision of a bus and a truck in Toledo Province killed at least 25 people.
- November 28 – Chile – A collision between a bus and a truck 200 miles south of Santiago on the Pan-American Highway killed 32 and injured 10.

=== 1982 ===
- January 25 – Peru – A train collided with a bus near Quilca, Huancayo, killing 10 people and injuring 40.
- January 31 – Chile – Two buses collide and plunge into a gorge on the outskirts of Santiago, killing 14 people and injuring 70.
- April 20 – Egypt – A bus carrying Greek tourists to visit the Saint Catherine's Monastery crashed near Arish in the Sinai Desert, killing 18 and injuring 27.
- August 1 – France – Beaune coach crash. Two buses carrying children collided with cars and burst into flames in Beaune, killing 53 people, including 44 children in the worst highway crash in France.
- August 12 – Mexico - Boxer Salvador Sánchez was killed when his Porsche 928 crashed into a truck along the federal highway from Querétaro to San Luis Potosí.
- September 12 – Switzerland – A bus carrying German tourists collides with a train on a level crossing near Zürich, killing 39 people. The barriers were not closed, because the operator pressed a wrong button. Only two passengers survived the crash. It was the worst road crash in Switzerland to date.
- September 13 – Monaco – Death of Grace Kelly. Grace, Princess of Monaco drove her Rover P6 off of a serpentine roadway and down a mountainside after suffering a stroke. She died in hospital the next day.
- September 19 – Australia – A bus carrying students from Merredin College returning from a football game in Perth ran off the road and struck a tree, killing 10 and injuring eight.
- November 3 – Afghanistan – Salang Tunnel fire – Hundreds were killed in a tunnel fire after a disaster involving a Soviet fuel convoy. Estimates are as great as 2,700 dead.

=== 1983 ===
- January 19 – United States – A semi-trailer truck crashed into a mainline toll booth on the Connecticut Turnpike in Stratford, Connecticut, after brake failure, killing six people and injuring four.
- February 11 – Greece – A Greek Railways bus carrying passengers from Thessaloniki to Athens was involved with a head-on collision with a truck 80 miles northwest of Athens killing 17 and injuring 10.
- April 10 – Soviet Union – A bus collided with another bus and plunged into a river. 37 people were killed, 46 injured.
- April 26 – Italy – A bus carrying students from Naples to Lake Garda collided with a trailer-truck in a highway tunnel just south of Florence, killing 12 and injuring 35.
- May 24 – Italy – A bus carrying elderly pilgrims from the city of Monza skidded off a highway and fell into a ravine near Tignale, killing all 14 occupants.
- September 14 – Austria – A bus carrying Hungarian tourists plunged off a mountain road near Frohnleiten, killing 13 people and injuring 33.
- November 1 – Thailand – A bus collided with a motorcycle and hit a second bus 600 km (370 mi) northeast of Bangkok, killing 21 people and injuring 40.
- December 18 – Italy – A bus carrying sailors from Aulla to Turin to watch a soccer match between A.C. Milan and Juventus FC skidded off an overpass near Genoa, killing 34 and injuring four.

=== 1984 ===
- June 11 – Venezuela – A bus carrying military cadets crashed into a bridge and caught fire, killing 33 people and injuring eight.
- September 24 – India – A bus plunges into a gorge in Uttar Pradesh, killing 42 people and injuring 15.
- December 11 – United Kingdom – During dense fog on the M25 motorway near Limpsfield, 26 vehicles collided, one of which was a petrol tanker which exploded, killing nine.
- December 24 – South Africa – A bus carrying contract workers from Cape Town crashed near Cradock, Eastern Cape killing 42 and injuring 25.

=== 1985 ===
- January 12 – South Korea – A bus going from Muju County to Daejeon plunged into an icy river near Yeongdong County, killing 40 of the 41 people on board. Passenger Kang Yu-il was the only survivor.
- January 27 – Japan – A bus carrying students and professors from Japan Welfare University skidded off a road near Nagano and plunged into a dam, killing 25 and injuring eight.
- February 11 – Germany – Langenbruck bus crash. A bus carrying members of the Royal Air Force band collided with a fuel tanker near Langenbruck, killing 21 and injuring 22.
- March 27 – South Africa – Westdene dam disaster – A school bus crashed through a barrier in Westdene, Gauteng, and plunged into a dam, killing 42 school children.
- June 11 – Israel – HaBonim disaster - A bus carrying school children on a field trip collided with a train near Moshav Habonim, killing 21 people, including 19 children.
- September 22 – Pakistan – A school bus rolls over in Layyah, killing 30 children.
- October 21 – United Kingdom – An Eastern Scottish coach collided with stationary traffic due to construction work on the M6 motorway in Lancashire, between Preston and Lancaster, killing 13 people.
- November 5 – Italy – A bus carrying mostly students and workers from Leonforte to Catania skidded off a bridge, killing 15 and injuring six.

=== 1986 ===
- May 23 – Philippines – A bus fell off a cliff and exploded in Hamtic, Antique, killing 23 people and injuring 15.
- May 30 – United States – A tour bus plunges into the West Walker River near Walker, Mono County, California, killing 21 people and injuring 19.
- June 23 – United Kingdom – A van returning from the Glastonbury Festival collides with a car on the M4 motorway, killing a total of 13 passengers, including nine in the van and four in the car.
- July 26 – United Kingdom – Lockington rail crash. A train derails after colliding with a Ford Escort at a rail crossing in Lockington, Yorkshire, England, killing eight people aboard the train and one aboard the car.
- September 27 – Sweden – Metallica's bus skids off the road, killing Cliff Burton.

=== 1987 ===
- January 21 - Chile – A collision between a bus and a logging truck kills 44 in Chile.
- March 29 – China – A bus plunges off a cliff in Shaanxi, killing 19 people and injuring 28.
- July 3 – Spain – A bus carrying elderly vacationers skidded off a highway and fell into a ravine near Ourense, killing 34 and injuring 11.
- July 4 – Portugal – A bus carrying tourists skidded into a house near Covilhã, killing 15 and injuring at least 30.
- July 26 – Brazil – A tourist bus, an Urban bus and a car collided with each other in Nova Lima, killing 68 and injuring an uncertain number of people, it is the deadliest traffic collision in Brazilian history.
- November 17 – Spain – A bus carrying workers to Madrid overturned near Toledo, killing at least 10 and injuring 37.
- December 11 – Egypt – A bus carrying local primary school children returning from the Giza Zoo was smashed by a fast-speed train at an unmarked railroad level crossing at Ein Sham, on the outskirts of Cairo, killing 62 children and injuring 67.

=== 1988 ===
- March 25 – Spain – An express train hit a nursery bus near Juneda, Catalonia, killing 15, including 12 children.
- April 1 – South Korea – A bus plunged into the Hangang river in Seoul after a tire blew out, killing 18 and injuring 36.
- May 14 – United States – Carrollton bus collision. 27 people die near Carrollton, Kentucky, after a collision with a drunk driver driving the wrong way on Interstate 71. It remains the deadliest drunk driving crash in American history.
- August 12 – Iran – Two buses collide on the highway between Tehran and Tabriz, killing 30 people and injuring 50.
- August 15 – Norway – Måbødalen bus accident. 16 people, including 12 children, die when a bus rams into a concrete wall in a tunnel 100 km (60 mi) east of Bergen.
- February 21 – India – A bus falls into a ravine near Shimla, killing 35 people.
- October 12 – China – A bus ignites after toppling into a ditch in Shaanxi, killing 43 people and injuring 40.
- December 23 – United States – Memphis tanker truck disaster. A tank truck hauling liquefied propane crashed in Memphis, Tennessee, killing 9, injuring 10, and starting multiple vehicle and structure fires.

=== 1989 ===
- May 9 – Peru – A bus plunged into the Mantaro River, near Jauja, killing 50. It is one of the worst accidents in Peruvian history, along with 2013 Santa Teresa bus disaster and 2018 Pasamayo bus crash.
- June 9 – Soviet Union – a bus collided with a train in Rostov Oblast, 31 people were killed.
- July 16 – Japan – A landslide caused by intense rain collapsed a tunnel in Echizen, Fukui, striking a minibus and killing 15 people.
- September 21 – United States – Alton, Texas bus crash – A truck hit a school bus in Alton, Texas, and the bus fell into a caliche pit filled with water killing 21 students.
- September 22 – Yugoslavia – At the level crossing in Pojatno, a passenger train on the Zagreb-Varaždin route, travelling at a speed of 80 km/h (49.7 mph) ran into one of three buses. They were carrying 2nd, 3rd and 4th grade students from the elementary school "Ante Kovačić" from Marija Gorica on an excursion to Stubičke Toplice. As a result of the accident, 14 students died.
- October 8 – Canada – Cormier-Village Hayride Accident. 13 people were killed and 30 were injured near Shediac when a transport truck carrying logs spilled its cargo while passing a loaded hayride.
- October 20 – Australia – Grafton bus crash – A Sunliner Express coach collided head-on with a tractor trailer truck on the Pacific Highway near Grafton, New South Wales, killing 21 people and injuring 22.
- December 22 – Australia – Kempsey bus crash. 35 people were killed on the Pacific Highway near Kempsey, New South Wales when two Denning Landseer coaches operated by McCafferty's and Trans City collided head-on. This is the deadliest road crash in Australia.

== 1990s ==
=== 1990 ===
- February 27 – Peru – A bus plunged into a 300-meter ravine in Pasamayo, killing 10 and injuring 28
- March 20 – United States – Whilst on tour, a semi trailer rammed into a tour bus containing singer Gloria Estefan, husband Emilio, their son and three other passengers in Tobyhanna, Pennsylvania, severely injuring Gloria. Following extensive surgery, she returned to an international tour ten months after the crash.
- April 22 – Cuba – Two buses collided in Havana, killing 11 people and injuring 13.
- May 12 – Peru – A bus plunged into a 100-meter ravine near Vitor District. 43 people died.
- June 3 – France – Joigny coach crash. A Shropshire based double-decker coach bus suffered a blowout of the front tyre on the autoroute A6 near Auxerre when it was 20 mph in excess of the speed limit. This caused it to crash, killing 11 people and injuring 61 British tourists, all returning from Costa Brava. This resulted in a legal action against Avon Rubber, manufacturer of the tyre of the crash coach, its driver and his employer; resulting in the longest legal case in France.
- July 8 – Soviet Union – A bus ignored a barrier at a railroad crossing and collided with a passenger train near Petrozavodsk, Karelia, Russian SFSR, killing 27 people (34 according to unofficial sources) and injuring 24.
- September 24 – Thailand – 1990 Bangkok gas explosion - A truck carrying two unsecured 20,000-liter liquefied petroleum gas tanks overturned on New Phetchaburi Road, downtown Bangkok. The explosions and resulting fires consumed 43 vehicles and many buildings in the area, killing 59 people and injuring 89.
- November 4 – South Korea – A bus carrying classmates of former president Chun Doo-hwan crashed into a reservoir near Inje after colliding with a truck, killing at least 21 people and injuring 20.
- November 5 – Italy – A bus carrying elderly vacationers from Arenzano to Gravellona Toce skidded off a bridge near Ovada, killing 30 occupants and injuring many others.
- November 9 – Netherlands – In sudden dense fog on the A16 motorway west of Breda, several cars and trucks collide in a huge pile-up. 10 people were killed and 28 injured.
- December 11 – United States – Interstate 75 fog disaster. A 99 car pile-up due to fog on Interstate 75 near Calhoun, Tennessee resulted in 12 deaths and 42 injuries.

=== 1991 ===
- February 15 – Thailand – Thung Maphrao truck explosion. A trailer truck carrying dynamite explodes at Thung Maphrao, Phang Nga killing 171 local villagers.
- March 13 – United Kingdom – M4 motorway crash. 10 people died in a 45 vehicle pile up in foggy conditions on the M4 motorway near Hungerford.
- July 31 – United States – A bus carrying about 60 Girl Scouts overturned on a desert mountain road near California Highway 111, not far from Palm Springs, killing eight people.
- August 1 – Peru – A collision between two buses near Huancayo 22 dead and 18 injured.
- August 4 – Zimbabwe – Nyanga bus accident. A crowded bus carrying school children from Regina Coeli Mission in Nyanga loses control and crashes in Troutbeck, Manicaland, killing 91 people, including 82 children.
- August 7 – Austria – The brakes of a Hungarian tourist bus fail in Styria, killing 15 people and injuring 28.
- November 29 – United States – Interstate 5 dust storm. A dust storm on Interstate 5 near Coalinga, California triggers a 164-vehicle pile up that leaves 17 people dead and 150 injured.

=== 1992 ===
- March 13 – South Korea – A bus crashed near Yeongcheon killing 13 and injuring 20.
- April 16 – Argentina – A collision involving three cars and a bus in Mar Chiquita Partido, leaves 32 dead.
- June 8 – Peru – Bus plunges into the Mantaro River near La Oroya. 17 dead
- June 11 – Peru – Bus plunges into a ravine in Corongo province; leaving 40 dead
- August 19 – Spain – A bus carrying visitors from Barcelona to Seville Expo '92 falls down an embankment on the A7 highway near Torreblanca, killing 45 and injuring 11.
- September 6 – Germany – Near Donaueschingen in the Black Forest, a bus collides into a passenger car and is slit open by a crash barrier, killing 21 people and injuring 32.
- November 6 – Mexico – Around 150 miles northwest of Mexico City – A bus collides with a semi-truck on the Pan-American Highway, killing 2 and injuring 46.
- December 23 – Peru – A bus collided with a truck near Huacho. 23 people died and 40 were injured.

=== 1993 ===
- January 4 – Mexico – A tour bus carrying mostly American tourists from Cancún to Chichen Itza crashed into a utility pole and caught fire, killing at least 24 passengers and injuring 23.
- January 9 – Argentina – Three buses collide and ignite on a highway in Santo Tomé, Corrientes, killing 55 people and injuring 70.
- January 15 – Peru – 21 dead and 18 injured after collision between bus and truck on the Pan-American Highway, near San Vicente de Cañete
- February 19 – Peru – 23 dead and 20 injured after a bus fell into a ravine near Chachapoyas.
- April 7 – Bulgaria – At least 29 people were killed and 18 injured when a Turkish coach fell from a bridge into the Yantra river near Byala, after colliding with a lorry. Another heavy Turkish lorry slammed into a crane set up on the bridge to lift the wreckage out of the water.
- May 27 – Peru – Bus falls into the ravine near Rosario de Yauca. 24 people die
- July 17 – Canada – Accident at Lac-Bouchette. A minibus carrying senior citizens from Verchères, Quebec on a pilgrimage to the shrine of St. Anthony of Padua near La Bouchette collided with a pick-up truck near Lac Saint-Jean, killing 19 people.
- July 17 – Peru – 22 dead and 18 injured after bus overturns in Pallasca province
- October 21 – Peru – Passenger truck plunges into ravine, killing 41 people in the Department of Moquegua
- November 10 – France – A pile-up on autoroute A10 near Mirambeau leaves 15 people dead and 53 injured.
- November 10 – United Kingdom – A bus carrying Canadian and American tourists collided with a van and skidded off the M2 Motorway near Faversham killing 10 and injuring 36.
- November 17 – United Kingdom – M40 minibus crash. A crash left 12 children dead when their minibus collided with a maintenance vehicle near Warwick, England, causing new road security campaigns.

=== 1994 ===
- January 9 - Indonesia – A bus carrying French tourists on the island of Bali plunged into a ravine after trying to avoid another vehicle, killing 10 people and injuring 19.
- April 2 – Peru – Bus plunges into a ravine in Izcuchaca District. 42 people died.
- May 2 – Poland – Poland bus disaster of 1994. 32 people died in a collision between a PKS transport agency bus and a tree near Gdańsk.
- June 4 – Peru – A pickup truck plunged into a 300-meter ravine in the Department of Cusco. 25 dead.
- December 24 – Peru – 19 dead after two buses collide on the Pan-American Highway near Chimbote

=== 1995 ===
- January 3 - Philippines – An overloaded bus missed a bridge and fell off a ravine in Echague, Isabela, killing at least 31 people and injuring 36.
- February 13 – Peru – A truck carrying passengers plunged into a ravine near Otuzco. 23 people died.
- March 12 – India – A truck carrying benzene rammed a bus outside Sriperumbudur, Tamil Nadu, killing 110 people.
- May 22 – United Kingdom – A bus carrying veterans from Christchurch on a day trip to a brewery in Cardiff veered off the M4 motorway and plunged into a river near Bristol, killing 10 and injuring 20.
- June 3 – Peru – Bus plunges into the Mantaro River near La Oroya. 22 dead and 36 injured
- June 16 – Spain – A bus carrying pensioners collided with a truck and a car near La Ràpita, killing 11 people and injuring 25.
- July 10 – France – A bus carrying mostly Spanish students from Amsterdam to Barcelona slammed into a road barrier near Roquemaure, Gard, killing 22 people and injuring 31.
- October 25 – United States – Fox River Grove bus–train collision. A train collided with a school bus at a grade crossing in Fox River Grove, Illinois, killing 7 children and injuring 21.
- December 17 – Peru – Bus plunges into ravine near Otuzco. 23 dead and 22 injured

=== 1996 ===
- February 10 – Japan – A huge shard of rock weighing about 21,000 tons smashed through Toyohama tunnel, national highway route 229, Yoichi, Hokkaido, crushing a Shakotan-Otaru regular route bus and a car, killing 20 people.
- February 25 – Bolivia – Two buses collide head-on near La Paz, killing at least 35 people.
- February 28 – Spain – A charter bus collides with a car near Bailen, killing 29 people and injuring 17.
- April 7 – Peru – A bus plunges into a ravine in Celendin province. 18 dead and 8 injured.
- April 28 – Peru – A bus plunges into a ravine near Estiquepampa, Tacna. 15 dead and 40 injured.
- June 28 – Peru – A train collides with a bus near La Oroya, killing 16 and injuring 36.
- September 29 – Japan – A minivan carrying construction workers crashed on national highway route 9, Muraoka, Hyōgo, killing 10 people.
- October 9 – Peru – Bus plunges into ravine in Carpapata, Department of Junín. 43 people die
- October 11 – Estonia – Pala accident. A school bus collided with a wood truck in Jõgeva County, killing eight people and injuring 29.
- November 2 – Peru – Bus plunges into ravine near Ticlio, killing 37 and injuring 15

=== 1997 ===
- January 14 – Egypt – A crowded city bus plunged into the Nile in Cairo, killing 39 people and injuring 24.
- January 19 – India – A bus plunged into a river after losing control on a curvy road in Punjab, killing 29 people and injuring 12.
- March 10 – United Kingdom – M42 motorway crash. Three people were killed and 60 injured in a 160 vehicle collision on the M42 motorway due to fog.
- March 11 – Peru – Avalanche drags minibus into a ravine in the department of Apurimac, killing 20.
- May 8 – India – 70 people heading to a wedding were killed when a truck plunged into a gorge in Hamirpur, Himachal Pradesh.
- July 15 – Spain – A bus carrying Japanese tourists crashed into another vehicle and caught fire near Toledo, killing 10 and injuring four.
- August 2 – Peru – Bus veers off the road and plunges into a ravine in the Lucanas province, killing 23 and injuring 40.
- August 8 – Peru – A bus collides with another bus on the Pan-American Highway, near San Pedro de Lloc, killing 27 and injuring 40.
- August 31 – France – Death of Diana, Princess of Wales. Diana, Princess of Wales died from injuries she sustained in a car crash in the Pont de l'Alma tunnel in Paris. Dodi Fayed and Henri Paul were also killed in the crash, with Trevor Rees-Jones being severely injured.
- October 13 – Canada – Les Éboulements bus accident. In Quebec, 44 people were killed when a bus plunged into a ravine, the worst bus crash in Canadian history.
- November 6 – Cuba – A passenger train crashes into a bus in Holguín Province, killing at least 56 people.
- November 27 – India – At least 34 people drowned when their bus fell into a canal in Karnataka.
- December 8 – Rwanda – 22 people were killed when a lorry collided with a minibus.
- December 28 – Peru – Bus falls into a ravine in Huancayo province, killing 24 and injuring 43

=== 1998 ===
- January 2 – India – Six people were killed and two others were seriously injured when a bus and a jeep collided in Rajasthan.
- January 5 – Zimbabwe – 43 people were killed and more than 60 seriously injured when a bus plunged down a steep slope in Nyanga after the brakes failed.
- January 7 – Kenya – A Meru-Nairobi Kenyan Bus Service regular route bus lost control of the vehicle and plummeted down 100 ft (30 m) embankment into Nithi river, killing 58 people and injuring 42.
- February 28 – India – 20 people died and 41 were injured when a school bus collided with a city bus at Ariapatti Vilakku, near Valandu in Tamil Nadu.
- March 9 – Saudi Arabia – At least 16 people were killed and six missing after their bus plunged into a flooded river.
- April 15 – South Africa – A school bus was involved in a five-vehicle collision near Newcastle, KwaZulu-Natal, killing 31 people, including 27 children.
- April 26 – Spain – At least 10 people were killed in bus crash in Province of Alicante.
- May 5 – Tanzania – At least 72 people drowned when the bus they were travelling in was swept into a river in Tanga Region.
- July 15 – India – At least 45 people were killed when a bus plunged into a river in Arunachal Pradesh.
- July 26 – South Africa – At least 19 people were killed and 60 injured near Zeerust when a bus collided with a truck on a sharp bend and overturned.
- June 28 – Peru – Bus falls into a ravine near Matucana, Department of Lima; killing 20 and injuring 35.
- August 12 – Montenegro – A bus crashed down a ravine and killed at least 18 people.
- August 26 – India – At least 17 people were killed when a bus hit a tractor trailer in Uttar Pradesh.
- August 30 – Nepal – At least 21 people were killed when a bus they were travelling in left the road and crashed down a hillside.
- September 8 – Brazil – A tanker truck flipped and exploded on a highway north of São Paulo, setting fire to two buses and killing at least 50 people.
- September 20 – Turkmenistan – About 40 people were killed in a bus-train collision.
- September 25 – Peru – Van plunges into ravine in Jaén province, Peru, killing 24 and injuring 17
- September 27 – Peru – At least 23 people died and 18 were injured when a bus fell off a ravine in Churcampa province
- November 11 – India – At least 40 people were killed when a bus plunged down a mountain gorge in Arunachal Pradesh.
- December 14 – India – At least 19 people were killed and 35 were injured when a bus fell into a gorge in the Pithoragarh district.
- December 23 – South Africa – At least 21 people killed when a bus collided with a large truck.
- December 25 – India – At least 19 people were killed in Andhra Pradesh when a bus crashed into a train.
- December 31 – United States – 100 cars crashed on an ice-slicked section of Interstate 75 in central Michigan, killing one and injuring 39.

=== 1999 ===
- January 9 – Georgia – A bus carrying funeral mourners ran off the road and plunged into a river below an outskirt of Stepantsminda, Khevi, killing 38 people.
- January 21 – Philippines – At least 22 were killed when a bus fell into a ravine near Baguio.
- January 24 – Austria – Deutschlandsberg bus crash. A bus carrying Hungarian skiers plunged off a hillside on the outskirts of Deutschlandsberg, Styria, killing 18 people and injuring 32.
- January 31 – South Africa – At least 31 people were killed in KwaZulu-Natal when a bus plunged off a bridge between Kokstad and Johannesburg.
- February 26 – Sweden – A minibus east of Karlskoga got stuck on a truck, was dragged along the road and caught fire. Seven children and two teachers were killed.
- March 8 – Peru – Bus falls into the Moche River, in department of La Libertad; killing 29.
- March 15 – United States – Bourbonnais, Illinois, train crash. A City of New Orleans train collided with a truck and derailed in Bourbonnais, Illinois, killing 11 people.
- March 24 – France and Italy – Mont Blanc tunnel fire. Thirty-nine people were killed in a tunnel fire between France and Italy.
- April 30 – Greece – A small vehicle collided with a stopped tanker truck loaded with propane and started a fire near Kamena Vourla, Fthiotis. A huge explosion followed several minutes later killing five people and injuring 14.
- May 9 – United States – Mother's Day bus crash. A charter bus crashed into a dirt embankment on Interstate 610 in New Orleans, killing 22 people and injuring 22.
- May 29 – Austria – 12 people were killed and 50 were injured in a collision and fire in Tauern Tunnel.
- June 6 – Kenya – At least eight people died after a bus burst a tyre and overturned in Naivasha on the main Nairobi to Nakuru highway. In another crash 12 were killed when a bus collided with another vehicle.
- June 8 – India – At least 94 people were killed, including 11 children, after a bus plunged into a lake in Karnataka.
- July 22 – India – A Kiari-Shimla HRTC regular route bus carrying 90 passengers plunged into a 40 ft (12 m) deep gorge on the outskirts of Baghar, Himachal Pradesh, killing 18 people and injuring 55.
- July 24 – Canada – A trailer truck crashed into cars slowed by roadwork on Quebec Autoroute 20 near Saint-Michel-de-Bellechasse, killing four people and injuring 11. A public investigation is launched.
- September 3 – Canada – Ontario Highway 401 crash. Dense fog on Highway 401 near Windsor, Ontario reduced visibility to less than a meter and caused an 87-vehicle pileup and fire that killed eight people and injured 33. Many vehicles were fused together by the intense heat.
- September 16 – Peru – Bus falls into the Mantaro River, near Jauja; killing 32 and injuring 28
- September 19 – Spain – At least 20 people died in a bus crash near Zaragoza.
- September 22 – South Africa – At least 11 people were killed in a head-on collision between a bus and a truck.
- September 28 – South Africa – A bus carrying British tourists crashed near Lydenburg after its brakes failed, killing 29 and injuring seven.
- October 4 – South Africa – At least 19 people were killed and 47 seriously injured after a bus crashed down a river embankment.
- October 5 – Indonesia – At least 45 people were killed in a bus crash in West Java between Jakarta and Bandung.
- October 9 – Israel – A tourbus in Galilee hit a slick spot on the road, rolled downhill and killed 17 people.
- October 25 – India – A bus swerved to avoid hitting a cow and skidded off a mountain road into a deep gorge, killing 27 people and injuring 47 on the way home from a temple in Hoshiarpur district, 70 miles (110 km) northeast of Amritsar.
- November 7 – India – At least 50 people were killed in a bus crash in Jammu and Kashmir.

== See also ==
- List of bridge failures
- List of level crossing accidents
- Lists of rail accidents includes level crossing crashes
- Multiple-vehicle collision
