= 1925 Dibbles Bridge coach crash =

1925 road accident in the UK

Coordinates: 54°03′48″N 1°55′21″W

Dibble's Bridge coach crash (1925)
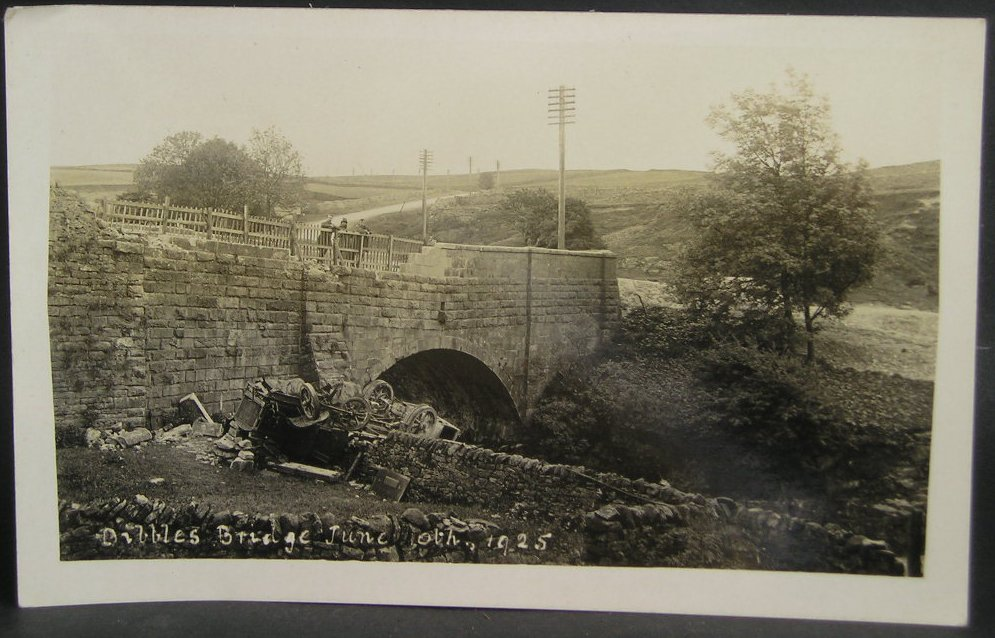
- A 1925 postcard showing the wrecked coach at the base of Dibbles Bridge

Details
- Date: 10 June 1925
- Location: Near Hebden, North Yorkshire
- Coordinates: grid reference SE 05065 63073
- Incident type: Bus accident
- Cause: Brake failure

Statistics
- Vehicles: 1
- Deaths: 7

On 10 June 1925, a coach crashed at the bottom of a steep hill at Dibbles Bridge, near Hebden in North Yorkshire, England. Seven people were killed and 11 others injured.

== Accident ==
The accident occurred when a 30-seater coach carrying a party of members of the York Municipal Employees' Guild and their families on an outing to Bolton Abbey from York suffered brake failure as it travelled down a 1:6 (9.5°) (16.67%) gradient from Fancarl Top to the bottom of the valley downstream of Grimwith Reservoir. It gained considerable speed and failing to negotiate the sharp bend at the bottom crashed through the parapet of Dibble's Bridge, landing on its roof. Many of the passengers were pinned beneath the vehicle, five being killed instantly, whilst two others died within half an hour. A number of other passengers were injured.

== Inquest ==
A witness at the inquest described how a man from the coach took a stone from a wall and put it under a wheel. The driver then got out to "do something underneath the vehicle". Later the witness saw that the coach was moving, and it went down the hill at speed until it hit the right hand side of the bridge, before striking the left hand side and falling a distance of 16 feet from the bridge. One of the witnesses from the coach testified that the driver had said "the brake has been burnt out" before he hit it two or three times with hammer, and later saying "It's all right now". A motor engineer explained that the condition of the brakes was caused by the lining of the brakes being slowly burnt away. The brake lining and had been changed recently and this was only the second trip since. A consulting engineer who examined the coach after the accident said the brake drums were oily and in his opinion the primary cause of the accident was oil on the rear brakes and the burning of the linings on the front brakes. The jury returned a verdict of accidental death, and suggested that a sign be placed at the top on Fancarl Hill saying that heavy vehicles must change to low gear and advise the passengers to walk down; and that steps be taken to widen the bridge.

== See also ==
- 1975 Dibbles Bridge coach crash – an almost identical accident that occurred fifty years later
