= 1975 Dibbles Bridge coach crash =

1975 road accident in North Yorkshire, England

Coordinates: 54°03′48″N 1°55′21″W

Dibble's Bridge coach crash
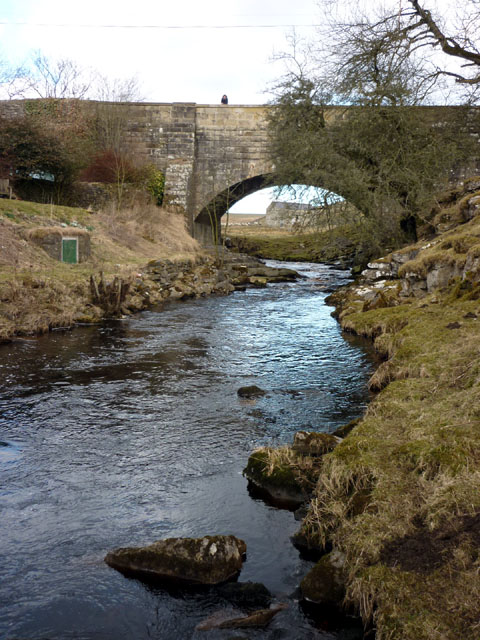
- Dibble's Bridge where the accident occurred

Details
- Date: 27 May 1975
- Location: Near Hebden, North Yorkshire
- Coordinates: grid reference SE 05065 63073
- Incident type: Bus accident
- Cause: Insufficient maintenance leading to brake failure.

Statistics
- Bus: Bedford Duple
- Vehicles: 1
- Deaths: 33
- Injured: 13

On 27 May 1975, a coach carrying elderly passengers crashed at the bottom of a steep hill at Dibble's Bridge over the River Dibb, near Hebden in North Yorkshire, England. Thirty-three people on board were killed, including the driver, and thirteen others injured. It was the worst-ever road accident in the United Kingdom by number of fatalities.

== Accident ==
The coach, a 1967 Bedford VAM5 run by Riley's Luxury Coaches, was carrying 45 female pensioners on a day trip from Thornaby-on-Tees, North Yorkshire, to Grassington, in the Yorkshire Dales. The trip was organised by Dorothy White, Lady Mayoress of Thornaby who had previously run several such trips.

While driving on a downhill stretch of the B6265 road between Greenhow and Hebden, stand-in coach driver Roger Marriott, a British Steel Corporation security officer, missed a gear. He then applied the brakes. The brakes had been serviced a week before the crash and had new linings, but as magistrates were later told, "defects" due to improper maintenance "meant there was no braking on the offside rear wheel".

The brakes were insufficient to hold the coach, and it accelerated, heating up the brakes until they eventually failed as the coach travelled down the 1,400-yard (1,300 m), 1:6 (17%, 10°) gradient from Fancarl Top to the bottom of the valley downstream of Grimwith Reservoir. After crashing through a steel crash barrier and a 3-foot (1 m) high stone parapet above the bank of the River Dibb, it landed on its fibreglass roof in the garden of a cottage 17 feet (5 m) below. The aluminium sides of the coach then buckled on impact with the ground.

The son-in-law of the cottage owners, London barrister (now painter and sculptor) Lincoln Seligman, was having a barbecue with his wife in the garden at the time and was first on the scene. He later gave an eyewitness account to the Teesside Evening Gazette: "There were screams. I dragged some people out ... I don't know how many".

Steven Griffin, Steve Jennison and Carl Dickinson, teenagers from Hull who were camping nearby, heard the crash and came to assist. One saw the bus flip over and saw the entire upper section crushed when it landed. They said the scene was silent when they arrived two minutes later, with the survivors stunned into silence. A car was flagged down and eventually one ambulance with a single driver arrived. He radioed a code which eventually brought a fleet of ambulances to ferry the injured to Airedale General Hospital in Keighley.

Thirty-three people on board were killed, including the driver, and thirteen others injured. It was the worst-ever road accident in the United Kingdom by number of fatalities.

== Inquest ==
An inquest at Skipton Town Hall, in July 1975, recorded a verdict of accidental death on the victims. Jury foreman John Mitchell said the accident was caused by the inability of the driver to negotiate the bend, owing to deficient brakes on the coach, due to possible lack of care in the maintenance of the braking system. The pathologist reported that the main cause of the loss of life was the crushing of the victims between the seats. The proprietor of the coach company, Norman Riley, was later fined £75 (equivalent to £583 in 2025) for running a motor vehicle with defective brakes.

== Aftermath ==
Even before the crash there had been a campaign to have electro-magnetic retarders fitted to all coaches. An electro-magnetic retarder uses the rotation of the axle to generate electricity, the energy for which has to come from the movement of the axle. The use of such a retarder means that the frictional brakes are kept cool for use at slow speeds. Local newspaper The Yorkshire Post staged a trial two weeks later: a coach which had been fitted with the retarder was put out of gear and allowed to run away down the hill without braking, and the retarder kept the coach's speed within safe limits. The Dibble's Bridge crash brought the issue to a wider public; ultimately, legislation was passed requiring improved braking systems.

A memorial service was held at St Paul's Church, Thornaby, in May 2015 to mark the 40th anniversary of the crash. A stone memorial was unveiled outside Thornaby Town Hall on the 47th anniversary of the crash in May 2022.

== See also ==
- 1925 Dibbles Bridge coach crash
