= Mândrești =

Mândrești may refer to several villages in Romania:

- Mândrești, a village in Ungureni Commune, Botoșani County
- Mândrești, a village in Vlădeni Commune, Botoșani County
- Mândrești, a village in Valea Mărului Commune, Galați County
- Mândrești-Moldova and Mândrești-Munteni, villages administered by Focșani city, Vrancea County
