= Vlădeni =

Vlădeni may refer to several places in Romania:

- Vlădeni, Botoșani, a commune in Botoşani County
- Vlădeni, Dâmbovița, a commune in Dâmboviţa County
- Vlădeni, Ialomița, a commune in Ialomiţa County
- Vlădeni, Iași, a commune in Iaşi County
- Vlădeni, a village in Corlăteni Commune, Botoşani County
- Vlădeni, a village in Dumbrăviţa Commune, Braşov County
- Vlădeni, a village in Cernăteşti Commune, Buzău County
