= River Dibb =

River in North Yorkshire, England

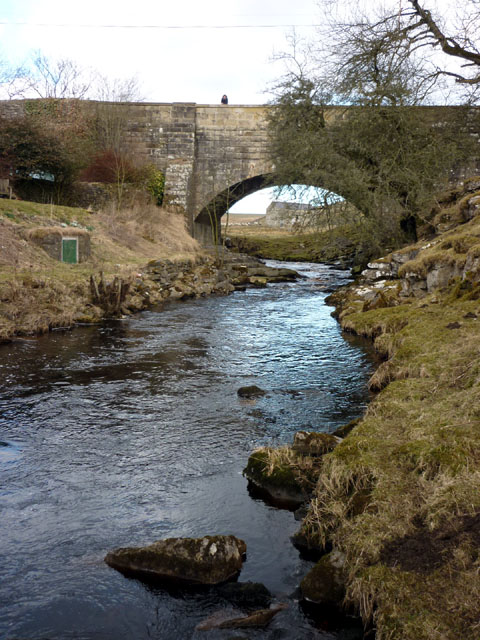
- River Dibb at Dibbles Bridge, which carries the B6265 between Pateley Bridge and Threshfield

Location
- Country: England

Physical characteristics
- Source
  - location: Grimwith Reservoir
  - coordinates: 54°4′48″N 1°54′41″W
  - elevation: 253 metres (830 ft)
- Mouth
  - location: River Wharfe nr Appletreewick
  - coordinates: 54°02′28″N 1°56′35″W
  - elevation: 143 metres (469 ft)
- Length: 5.2 km (3.2 mi)
- Basin size: 25.5 km^{2} (9.8 sq mi)

The River Dibb, also known as Barben Beck, is a river located in North Yorkshire, England. It is a tributary of the River Wharfe. Grimwith Reservoir is at the head of the River Dibb at a point some 2.5 miles (4 km) from Appletreewick. The river flows for 5.2 kilometres (3.2 mi), and must maintain a flow of 273,000 cubic metres (9,600,000 cu ft) of water a day into the River Wharfe system.

== Toponymy ==
The name is possibly derived from the Olde English dib, a dialectical form of dip meaning hollow, or deep place pool. The name of Dybb/Dibb is recorded in local 14th century records as Dybbe, a now lost hamlet near Burnsall, where the people who lived there were lead miners.

== Course ==
The river starts from the south side of Grimwith Reservoir and flows south-west through Burnett Fold Nook and then south before returning south-west to pass under the B6265 at Dibble's Bridge, which has been the scene of two coach crashes - one in 1925 when seven people were killed, and one in 1975 when 33 people were killed. Below its confluence with Holes Beck, the Ordnance Survey maps show the name of the river changing to Barben Beck. It follows a mostly southerly course through Rough Close Wood and Barnscar Plantation to Rookcroft Wood. It turns west through Sprinsgide Wood and then south-west again past Hartlington Mill, where it was once used to power a 5.5-metre (18 ft) diameter undershot water wheel, and under Hartlington Bridge before joining the River Wharfe.

The river flows for 5.2 kilometres (3.2 mi) largely over millstone grit, which overlays limestone and shales. A leat used to take water from a high point of the river (between the overflow of the reservoir and Dibbles Bridge) to a lead mine near to Barben Beck.

== Ecology ==
The river is noted as having white-clawed crayfish, brown trout and arctic char present. The arctic char were introduced into Grimwith Reservoir from Windermere in 1989, 1990, and 1991. Surveys detected the fish in the River Dibb in 1995 and 1998. In 2015, Yorkshire Water agreed to keep a constant flow in the river from Grimwith Reservoir. As the designation of Grimwith Reservoir is one of compensation when needed in times of low water flow in the Wharfe and beyond, the river historically could run dry, making it difficult for wildlife to survive in the river. Yorkshire Water are required to allow 272,760 cubic metres (9,632,000 cu ft) to flow into the River Wharfe from Grimwith Reservoir via the River Dibb on a daily basis.

== Folklore ==
Dibble's Bridge is sometimes referred to as Devil's Bridge. It is traditionally said to have been built by the Devil for a shoemaker named Ralph Calvert, after Calvert offered the Devil a drink.

== Lists ==
=== Tributaries ===
- Birsta Gill Dike
- Stone Gill Dike
- Holes Beck

=== Settlements ===
- Dibble's Bridge
- Hartlington

=== Crossings ===
- B6265 Dibble's Bridge
- Hartlington Bridge
