= 2017 Verona bus crash =

2017 traffic collision in Italy

Coordinates: 45.4108°N 11.0911°E

- A4 motorway

Details
- Date: 20 January 2017
- Location: A4 motorway at 298th km, at San Martino Buon Albergo
- Country: Italy
- Operator: Pizolit Busz Személyszállító Kft.
- Owner: Pizolit Busz Személyszállító Kft.
- Incident type: Collision, fire
- Cause: Barrier design flaw, possible wheel failure.

Statistics
- Passengers: 54 (+2 drivers)
- Deaths: 17 (all Hungarians)
- Injured: 25 (10 serious, 1 critical)

The 2017 Verona bus crash was a traffic collision that happened around midnight at night of 20–21 January 2017 on the A4 motorway at San Martino Buon Albergo, near Verona, in Italy. A coach that was transporting Hungarian high school students (14–18 years old) and their teachers back from a skiing trip in France collided with the highway traffic barrier, crashed into a bridge pylon, and then caught fire.

The fire charred the bus. Sixteen people on board the bus were killed and at least 26 sustained injuries, 10 serious and two life-threatening. Some of the bodies of victims were burned beyond recognition, and the investigation team had to take DNA samples of the parents of the deceased victims to identify the bodies. One of the seriously injured victims suffered third-degree burns. He died on 22 March, raising the number of victims to 17. The accident became one of the most severe foreign bus crash involving Hungarians, along with the 1999 Deutschlandsberg bus crash which claimed 18 lives.

== Accident ==
There were 56 people on board: two drivers, teenage students from the Szinyei Merse Pál Gimnázium in Budapest and adults accompanying them including one teacher's family, returning from skiing in France.

The Setra S317 GT-HD coach was travelling on the A4 motorway at San Martino Buon Albergo near Verona, when, for unknown reasons, the vehicle collided with the traffic barrier and then crashed into a bridge pylon. The collision crushed the right side of the coach up until the middle door and it caused a fuel fire almost immediately. With the front door obliterated and the middle door blocked by the pylon, the surviving occupants had to break out windows on the left side to be able to escape; one student ran through the bus breaking windows with a hammer, and was later found dead.

Most people on board were sleeping at the time of the accident. A physical education teacher and his wife returned to the bus several times to rescue students. Both of their children died in the accident, and the teacher suffered burn injuries on his back during rescue. Other drivers on the road stopped to help, giving the survivors clothes and blankets, and a cell phone to call families. One driver Lanfranco Fossa stayed for over an hour to help translate for rescue crews, as the students did not speak Italian, only Hungarian and English.

There were reports that a following truck driver had noticed "something wrong" with one of the coach's wheels, and black smoke coming from the rear. Italian authorities found no braking marks on the scene of the crash.

== Investigation ==
Hungarian Foreign Minister Péter Szijjártó confirmed that an investigation into the cause of the accident began soon afterwards. According to the Hungarian Foreign Minister, the driver lost control of the coach and that investigators had found no brake marks at the scene. The bus company, Pizolitbusz Ltd, is being investigated; the owner told media the bus had been in good condition.

Analysis of the crash revealed that the barrier placed on the side of the highway did not behave according to the safety regulations: instead of bending and guiding the vehicle back to safety, it broke, causing a punctured wheel and acting like a rail trap carrying the bus into the bridge pylon. There was no reinforcement or doubling in the barrier structure before the dangerously close bridge pylon, as is usual in such locations, and the barrier structure was anchored on soft ground rather than concrete. Light poles mounted dangerously close to the guardrail (inside the deformation zone of the barrier, where they should not have been mounted) were knocked out by the bus, causing an electrical short circuit and igniting leaking fuel.

Italy's State radio reported that a Slovenian truck driver driving behind the bus noticed a problem with one of the wheels of the bus and tried to alert the driver of the bus. The broadcaster continued to report that the Slovenian truck driver stayed at the scene, attempting to help until investigators arrived. Four years later the driver was convicted.

== Reactions ==
Both the Hungarian Police and the Hungarian Ambulance Service (OMSZ) sent a team to Italy to assist the accident investigation and to help the survivors. To help the survivors and victims' families in coping with the psychological shock after the crash, several Hungarian psychologists travelled to Verona.

Hungarian Prime Minister Viktor Orbán and Italian Prime Minister Paolo Gentiloni expressed condolences for the victims of the accident. The Hungarian government declared 23 January as a national day of mourning in memory of the victims. On that day, Prime Minister Viktor Orbán, President János Áder, Parliamentary Speaker László Kövér and other officials attended a military ceremony in which the national flag at Kossuth Lajos Square in front of the Hungarian Parliament was raised and then lowered to half-mast. Public institutions including BKV buses displayed a black flag, multiple television stations displayed a black ribbon or a black station logo, and several entertainment venues cancelled concerts and events.

The Italian ambassador to Hungary and hundreds of students, parents and relatives gathered outside the school mourning the accident and paid homage by lighting candles, memorial photos, drawings and laying flowers.

== See also ==
- Sierre coach crash
- Måbødalen bus accident
- Beaune coach crash
