= Lincoln Seligman =

British artist (born 1950)

Lincoln Seligman (born 1950) is a British artist, best known for his large-scale sculptures and murals displayed at modern landmark buildings worldwide.

Lincoln was born the eldest son of Madron Seligman, (an industrialist and a pro-European Member of the European Parliament for West Sussex from 1979 to 1984) and his wife, Nancy-Joan. He was educated at Harrow School, winning an exhibition to Balliol College, Oxford to study jurisprudence. He was called to the Bar in 1973 and became a professional painter and sculptor in 1980.

His godfather was Edward Heath, a close friend of his father.

Prominent works include Intervention, above the entrance of the Treatment Centre of the Chelsea and Westminster Hospital in London, and many large scale sculptures displayed at Hong Kong Harbor and on the Kowloon peninsula.

Seligman is a member of the Royal British Society of Sculptors.

He was one of the first on the scene at the Dibbles Bridge coach crash on 27 May 1975, when a coach crashed into the garden of the house where he was staying near Grassington in North Yorkshire.
