= Listed buildings in Hebden, North Yorkshire =

Hebden is a civil parish in the county of North Yorkshire, England. It contains ten listed buildings that are recorded in the National Heritage List for England. All the listed buildings are designated at Grade II, the lowest of the three grades, which is applied to "buildings of national importance and special interest". The parish contains the village of Hebden and the surrounding countryside, and the listed buildings consist of houses, two barns, a bridge and a church.

== Buildings ==
Name and location	Photograph	Date	Notes
7 Brook Street; 54.06533°N 1.96179°W	—	Early 17th century	The house is in gritstone with quoins and a stone slate roof. There are two storeys and two bays. On the front are two doorways and a window covered by a conservatory. Some of the windows are mullioned, and others are later casements. Inside, there is decorative plasterwork.
Town Head Barn; 54.06563°N 1.96410°W	—	17th century (probable)	The barn is in gritstone, with quoins, and a stone slate roof with a stone ridge and moulded kneelers and coping on the southwest. There are seven bays, with haylofts above three of the bays, and a later extension. The openings include a wide cart entrance with a segmental head, a quoined and chamfered surround and voussoirs, various windows, slit vents, and a doorway with quoined jambs, a Tudor-style lintel with sunk spandrels.
Scar Top House; 54.07118°N 1.95904°W		Mid to late 17th century	The house is in gritstone, with quoins, and a stone slate roof with bulbous kneelers and gable coping. There are two storeys, and originally one bay, with a bay added to the left, and two bays at right angles on the right. In the original bay is a doorway with a chamfered surround and a triangular head, and a recessed mullioned window to the right, both under a continuous hood mould. Above the doorway is a narrow round-headed window with a chamfered surround, and to the right is a mullioned window.
The Green House; 54.06295°N 1.96120°W	—	1674	The house is in gritstone with quoins and a stone slate roof. There are two storeys and four bays. The doorway has a chamfered quoined surround and an arched head. Most of the windows are recessed with chamfered mullions, and some have hood moulds. Above the doorway is a square dated and inscribed plaque.
Chestnut House; 54.06204°N 1.95985°W	—	Late 17th century	The house is in gritstone with quoins and a stone slate roof. There are two storeys and four bays. The doorway has a segmental head and chamfered quoined jambs. The windows are mullioned, some with flat-faced mullions, and others with chamfered mullions. At the rear is a doorway with a segmental head and a chamfered surround.
Barn at SE 0243 6323; 54.06508°N 1.96446°W	—	Mid 18th century	The barn is in gritstone, with quoins, and a stone slate roof with bulbous kneelers and gable copings. In the centre are double doors under a cambered arch with voussoirs and quoined jambs. To the left is a byre door with a quoined surround and a chamfered lintel, and to the right is a square pitching door.
Old Bridge; 54.06477°N 1.96192°W		Late 18th century	The bridge carries Brook Street over Hebden Beck. It is in stone, and consists of a single arch of chamfered voussoirs. There is a projecting band at road level, projecting slightly ridged coping stones, and the parapet walls are splayed on each side of the bridge.
Garden building northeast of Saxelby House; 54.06242°N 1.96022°W	—	Late 18th century	The building is in gritstone with quoins and a stone slate roof. It has a single storey and a lean-to roof. On the front is a round-arched doorway that has a keystone with vermiculated rustication.
Saxelby House; 54.06224°N 1.96050°W	—	Late 18th to early century	The house is in gritstone, with quoins, a sill band, an eaves band, and a stone slate roof with shaped kneelers and gable copings. There are two storeys and three bays. The central doorway has an architrave, a fanlight, an entablature and a cornice. The windows are sashes.
St Peter's Church; 54.06265°N 1.96171°W		1840–41	The church is in stone with slate roofs, and consists of a nave, a south porch, a chancel and a west tower. The tower has two stages, lancet bell openings, a pierced parapet and corner pinnacles. The windows in the body of the church are lancets with hood moulds, and the east window is a triple lancet, the middle light higher.
