= Huțani bus accident =

1980 motor vehicle accident in Romania

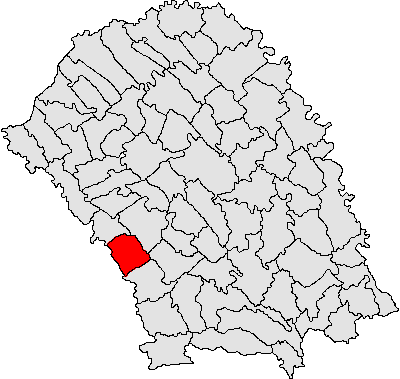
- Location within the county

Details
- Date: June 29, 1980
- Location: Huțani, Botoșani County
- Country: Romania

Statistics
- Deaths: 48
- Injured: 35
- Damage: A bus

The Huțani bus accident was the deadliest road accident in Romanian history. On 29 June 1980, an overloaded bus (83 people on 40 seats) overturned in a five-meter deep swamp in the village of Huțani, commune of Vlădeni, Botoșani County. The accident killed at least 48 people and another 35 were injured.

== Accident ==
On 29 June 1980, the deadliest road accident ever to have occurred in the country took place. A bus traveling on the route Suceava–Botoșani capsized off a bridge into a deep swamp. Explosion of a tire caused the accident, according to the authorities. Of the 83 people on board, only 35 survived. The bodies of 48 victims were first placed on the edge of a nearby pond and then transported to the morgue with a truck. The last bodies were removed from the water the next day, when the bus was recovered. The place where the accident occurred is now known as Bridge of the 48 crosses.

== Reaction of authorities ==
The country heard about the accident from the radio broadcast service "Radio Free Europe". A few days later, the Deputy Minister of Transport came to Botoșani, accompanied by a delegation of security officers. The only concrete result was the ban on using retreaded tires for buses. No word has been mentioned about compensation. Relatives have just received approval to erect crosses. Within days of the accident, the swamp was filled.

Now, the road is called "Road of death" because the large number of accidents that happen every year. To stem the number of tragedies, traffic police took a single measure, reducing the speed limit to 70 kilometers per hour.
