= St Peter's Church, Hebden =

Church in Hebden, North Yorkshire, England

Coordinates: 54°03′46″N 1°57′42″W

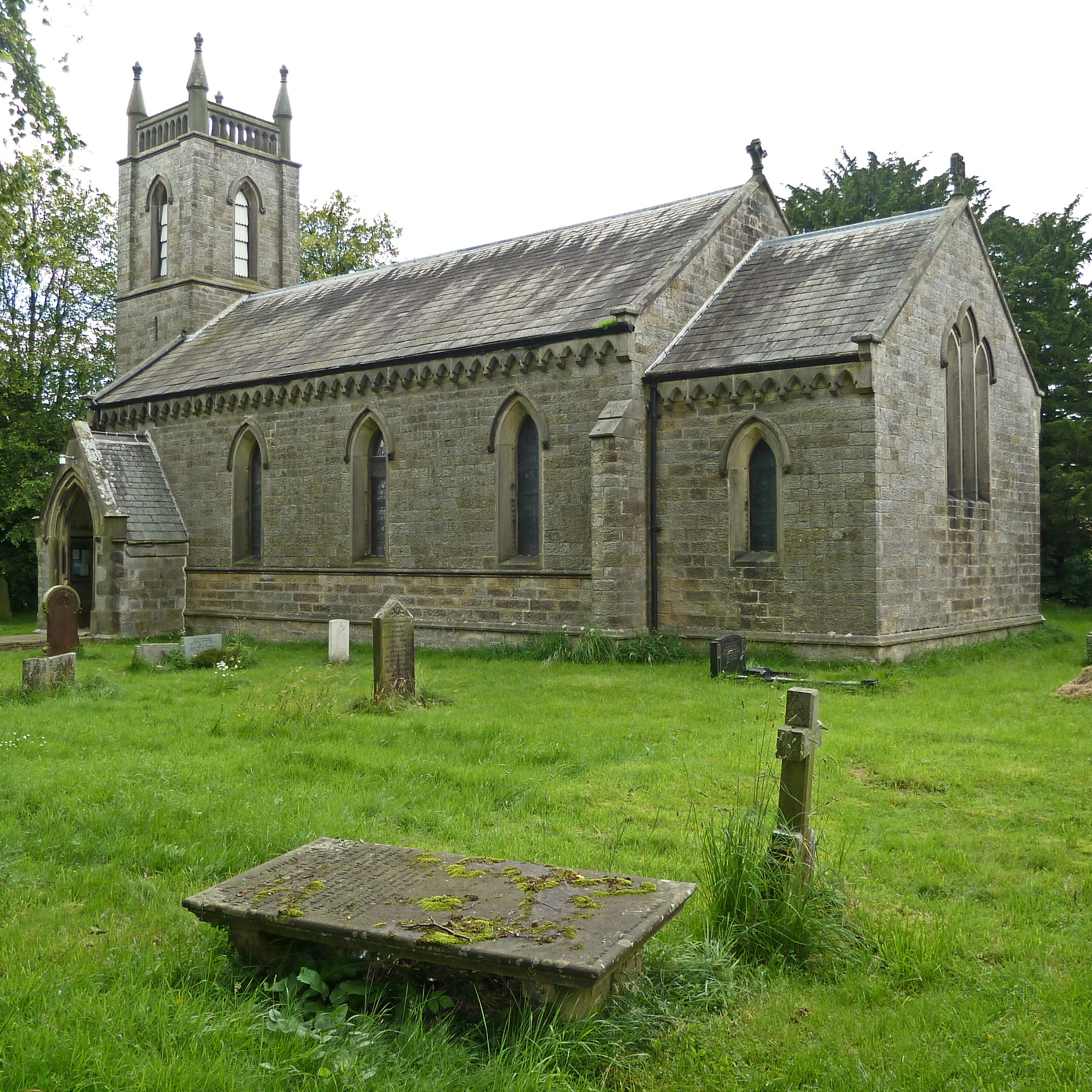
The church, in 2011

St Peter's Church is an Anglican Chapel of Ease in Hebden, North Yorkshire, in England. Hebden lies within the ecclesiastical parish of Linton, North Yorkshire, with the parish church being St. Michael's.

St. Peter's was designed by the curate of Linton, John Pearson Fearon, in the Gothic Revival style. On land donated by the Rev Henry Bailey, it was constructed in 1841, for a total cost of £756. It had a capacity of 190 worshippers, although in 1851, average attendance was only 59. The church was grade II listed in 1994.

The church is built of stone with slate roofs, and consists of a nave, a south porch, a chancel and a west tower. The tower has two stages, lancet bell openings, a pierced parapet and corner pinnacles. It has a single bell cast at Whitechapel Bell Foundry in 1847, and hung in 1848. The windows in the body of the church are lancets with hood moulds, and the east window is a triple lancet, the middle light higher.

Inside, most of the original fixtures and fittings survive, including the pews, doors, pulpit, reading desk, altar rail, and stone font. The original entrance was on the north-east side. The current main entrance with its porch on the south-west of the building were built during restoration work in 1884. The pipe organ was installed in 1894 and was manufactured by Harrison & Harrison of Durham. It was refurbished in 2010 by A. Carter of Wakefield, and has been granted a Grade II Historic Organ Certificate. The stained glass in the east window is original, while that in the other windows was installed in 1884. There is a war memorial to World War I, consisting of a brass plaque.

The churchyard contains one Commonwealth war grave, that of a Royal Air Force airman of the Second World War.

== See also ==
- Listed buildings in Hebden, North Yorkshire
