= Nyanga bus accident =

School bus accident in Zimbabwe

- Date: 3 August 1991
- Location: Near Nyanga, Manicaland Province, Zimbabwe
- Type: School bus crash
- Cause: Excessive speed; failure to negotiate curves
- Participants: Bus carrying students to Regina Coeli School
- Deaths: 89 (including 82 schoolchildren and the driver)

The Nyanga bus accident occurred on 3 August 1991 and was Zimbabwe's worst traffic accident. 89 people died including the driver and 82 school children. The bus left the road while travelling to the Roman Catholic Regina Coeli School following a school sports day at the St Killian's Mission school. According to witnesses, the bus had been travelling at an excessive speed for the winding roads. Passengers and even the driver of another car had urged the driver to slow down prior to the crash.
