= 1999 Deutschlandsberg bus crash =

Road incident in Austria

On 24 January 1999, a bus carrying Hungarian teenagers on a skiing holiday went off the road in the mountains near Deutschlandsberg in Styria, Austria. Eighteen people were killed and 32 injured.

== Crash ==
The bus was carrying 45 people, primarily teenagers aged between 15 and 18 from two schools in Kőszeg; they were returning to their lodgings at the castle in Limberg at the end of the first day of a weeklong skiing holiday. At about 4:45 p.m., on a steep downward slope, the driver found himself unable to slow the bus. He collided with barriers on the left side of the road, but guided the bus around two curves, overtaking other vehicles; however, on the third curve at a point between Deutschlandsberg and Trahütten, at a speed of about 100 kilometres per hour (62 mph) as recorded on the tachograph, the bus left the road, went through an embankment, and after approximately 15 metres (49 ft) collided with the opposite slope below a farmhouse, overturned once or twice, and came to rest upside down against a tree; its fall was observed by the house's owner through the kitchen window. Eighteen people were killed and 32 injured, 17 seriously.

== Aftermath ==
Emergency services reached the crash site quickly because they had been at a minor collision a short distance away; some parents were also following the bus in a car, including a physician who when she began to render aid, found her own daughter's body. The injured were treated at hospitals in Deutschlandsberg and Graz; the dead were all identified within three days. The crash coincided with a summit meeting of the heads of state of Austria, Hungary and Slovakia; the Hungarian Prime Minister, Viktor Orbán, planned to visit the injured. Hungary declared a national day of mourning on 31 January.

The road at the time was not snowy or icy. Investigation of the crash showed that the Neoplan bus was twenty years old and had a high mileage. There were no brake marks on the road, and it was concluded that despite having been tested and passed a few months before, the brakes had failed. The driver, who was one of the people seriously injured in the crash, had said he was very tired, having not had enough rest since his previous assignment. He was found responsible for putting the bus into neutral gear, which made it impossible for him to use the engine to brake, although he was trying with both hands to shift gears. He was sentenced by a court in Graz to three years in prison for reckless endangerment, but released after 15 months, and returned home to Szombathely, where he died in August 2001.

The crash location is marked with a cross. A memorial service was held in Deutschlandsberg to mark the fifteenth anniversary in 2014. A small memorial site was later established in the yard of the Jurisich Miklós Gimnázium in Kőszeg where all of the victims' name appeared in a marble tablet. A memorial service is held there in January 24th every year and flowers often placed on other dates during the year by people attending to class reunions.

== See also ==
- 2017 Verona bus crash
