= Grimwith Reservoir =

Reservoir in North Yorkshire, England

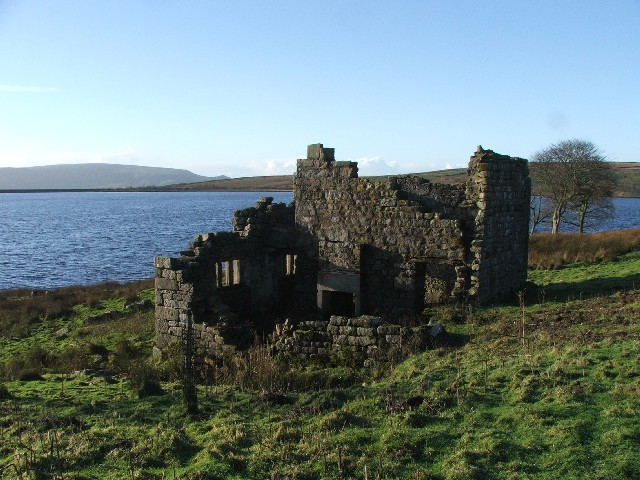
- A view of Grimwith Reservoir from the ruin on the north shore.

- Location within North Yorkshire
- Location: Yorkshire Dales, England
- Coordinates: 54°04′48″N 01°54′41″W
- Type: Reservoir
- Primary inflows: Blea Beck, Gate Up Gill, Grimwith Beck
- Primary outflows: River Dibb
- Catchment area: 25.5 km^{2} (9.8 sq mi)
- Basin countries: United Kingdom
- Surface area: 1.47 km^{2} (0.57 sq mi)
- Average depth: 14.8 m (49 ft)
- Water volume: 21,772,000 m^{3} (4.789×10^{9} imp gal)
- Surface elevation: 308 m (1,010 ft)

Grimwith Reservoir is located in the Yorkshire Dales in North Yorkshire, England. It was originally built by the Bradford Corporation as one of eleven reservoirs in the Yorkshire Dales to supply fresh water to Bradford. It is the largest reservoir owned by Yorkshire Water in terms of water storage. It is near the villages of Appletreewick, Burnsall, Hartlington, Hebden, and Skyreholme.

== Etymology ==
The name Grimwith was recorded as Grymwith in 1540. It is believed to derive from the Old English grima, meaning "spectre" or "ghost", and the Old Norse viðr, meaning "wood", possibly referring to "the wood haunted by a ghost or goblin".

== History ==
Grimwith (pronounced Grim'ath) is accessed from the B6265 road 1.5 miles (2.4 km) east of Hebden and 8 miles (13 km) west of Pateley Bridge. With a surface area of 1.47 square kilometres (0.57 sq mi) and holding 21,772,000 cubic metres (4.789×10^{9} imp gal) of water it is Yorkshire Water's largest reservoir.

The original reservoir was completed in 1864 by the Bradford Corporation, the local authority for the city of Bradford, covered 102 acres, contained up to 670 million gallons and was approximately 288 metres (945 ft) above sea level in Wharfedale. This involved the abandonment of the hamlets of Grimwith and Gate Up, which would be flooded as part of the reservoir. Grimwith was intended to be a compensation reservoir, rather than be used for storage, and of the eleven reservoirs built by the Bradford Corporation, Grimwith was the most distant at 20 miles (32 km) from Bradford town centre (Bradford at that time, was not yet a city). Following an agreement made in 1970 the size of the reservoir was increased by seven times and the water level was raised by 20 metres (66 ft), with work starting in 1976 and being completed in 1983. The reservoir outlet is the site of a renewable energy project that saw the installation of a small turbine that generates 1400 MWh of electricity per annum.

The reservoir is an important area for birds and is home to wildfowl such as Eurasian wigeon, teal, greylag geese and Canada geese. Other birds that can be seen at various times in the area include ringed plover, northern lapwing, common redshank, Eurasian curlew, reed bunting, lesser redpoll, whinchat and sedge warbler.

The reservoir is a popular destination for leisure activities such as sailing, walking and visitors to Stump Cross Caverns. A 4.5-mile (7.2 km) wheelchair-accessible footpath / track circumnavigates the reservoir. The Yorkshire Dales Sailing Club have their facilities on the south side of the reservoir, and regularly hold meets and sailing championships. In 2019, the club announced that it had been awarded Recognised Training Centre status by the Royal Yachting Association.

At the eastern end of the reservoir is a grade II listed barn. The Cruck Barn used to be further west, but was reconstructed on its present site above the waterline to preserve it. This type of barn is rare for the Yorkshire Dales. Its origins were in the 16th century and was rebuilt in 1982 when the reservoir was extended.

== Gallery ==
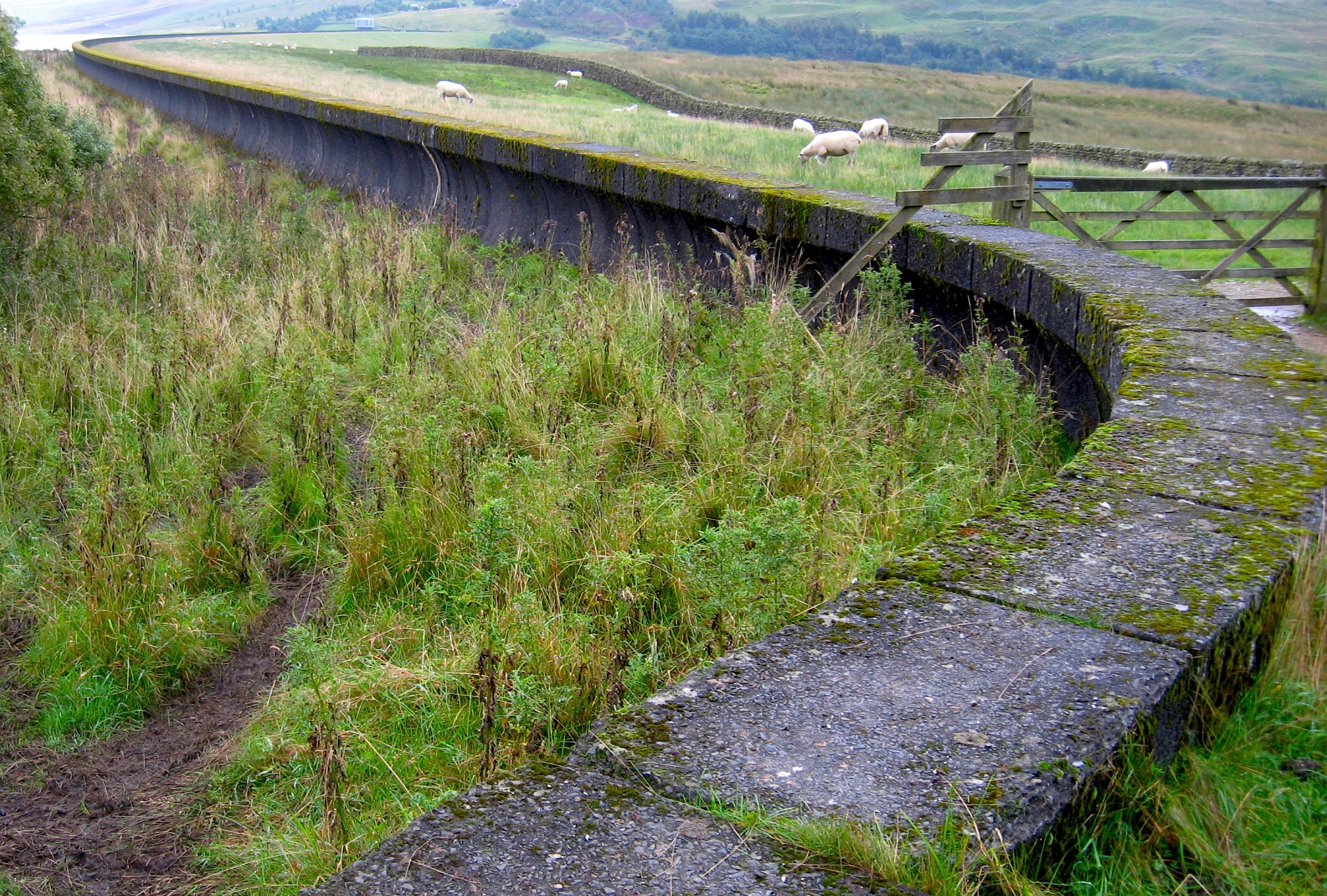
Extended parapet of Grimwith Dam, north

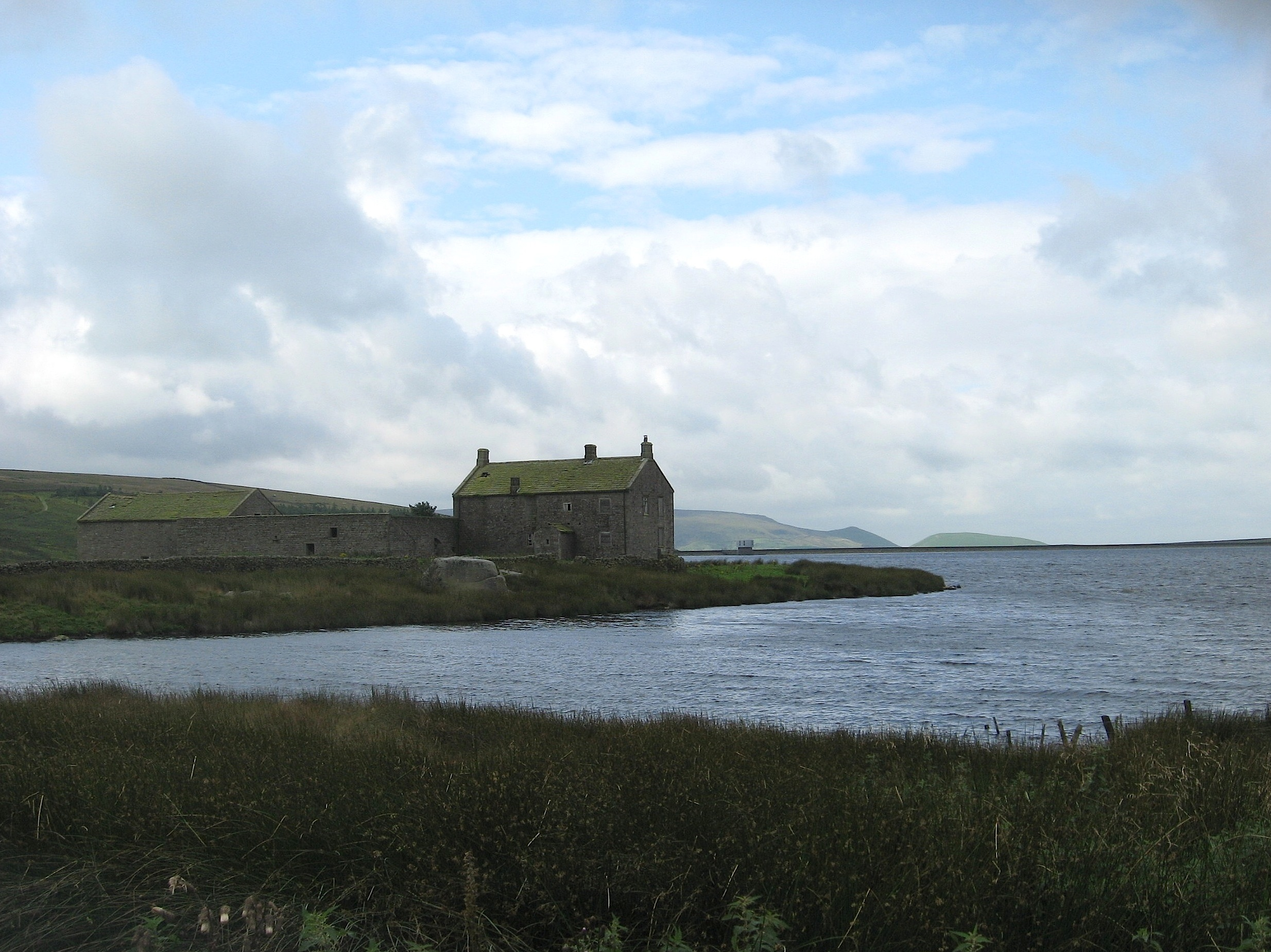
Grimwith House, from east, reef knolls beyond

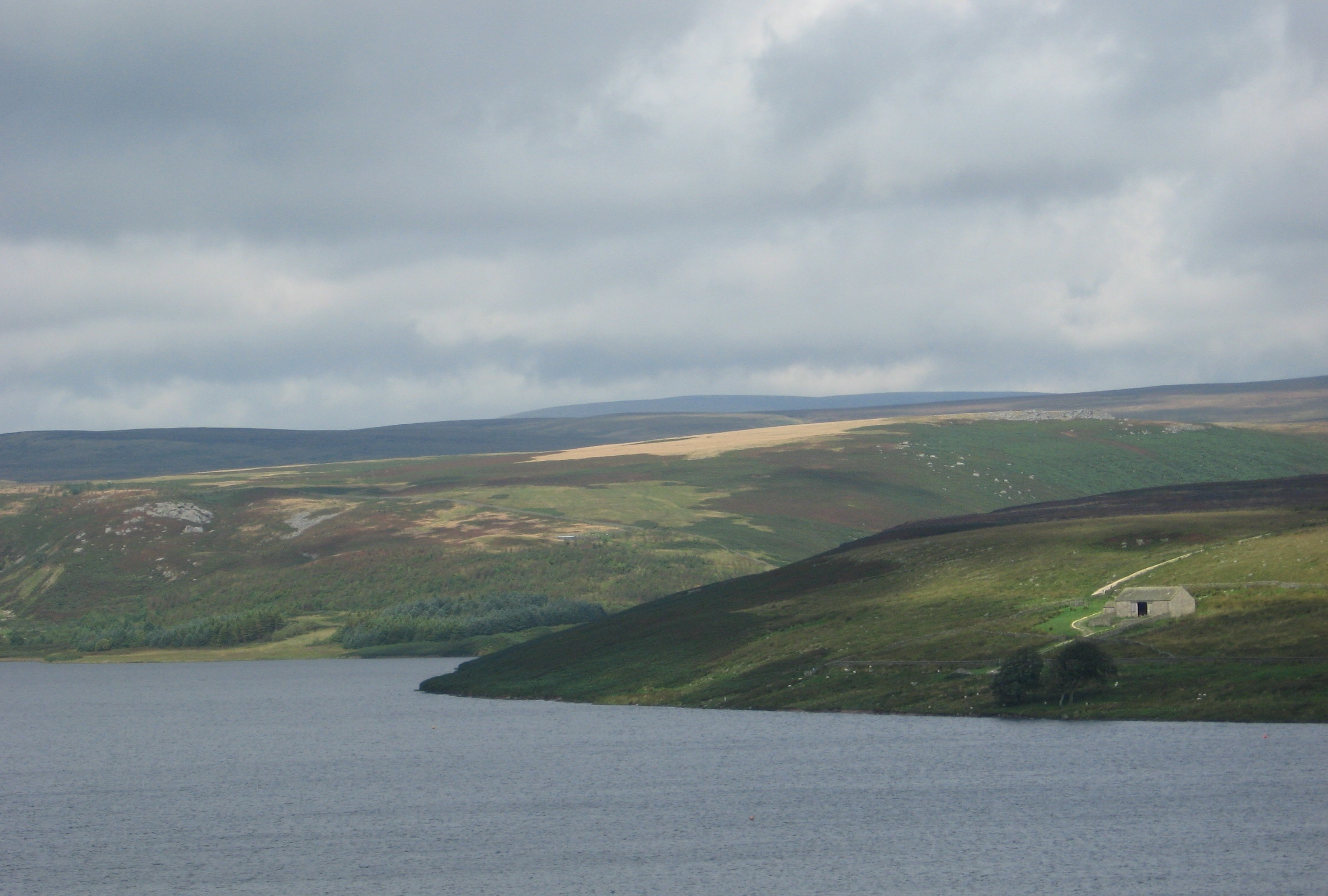
Late summer view toward Bracken Haw, across Reservoir, NW

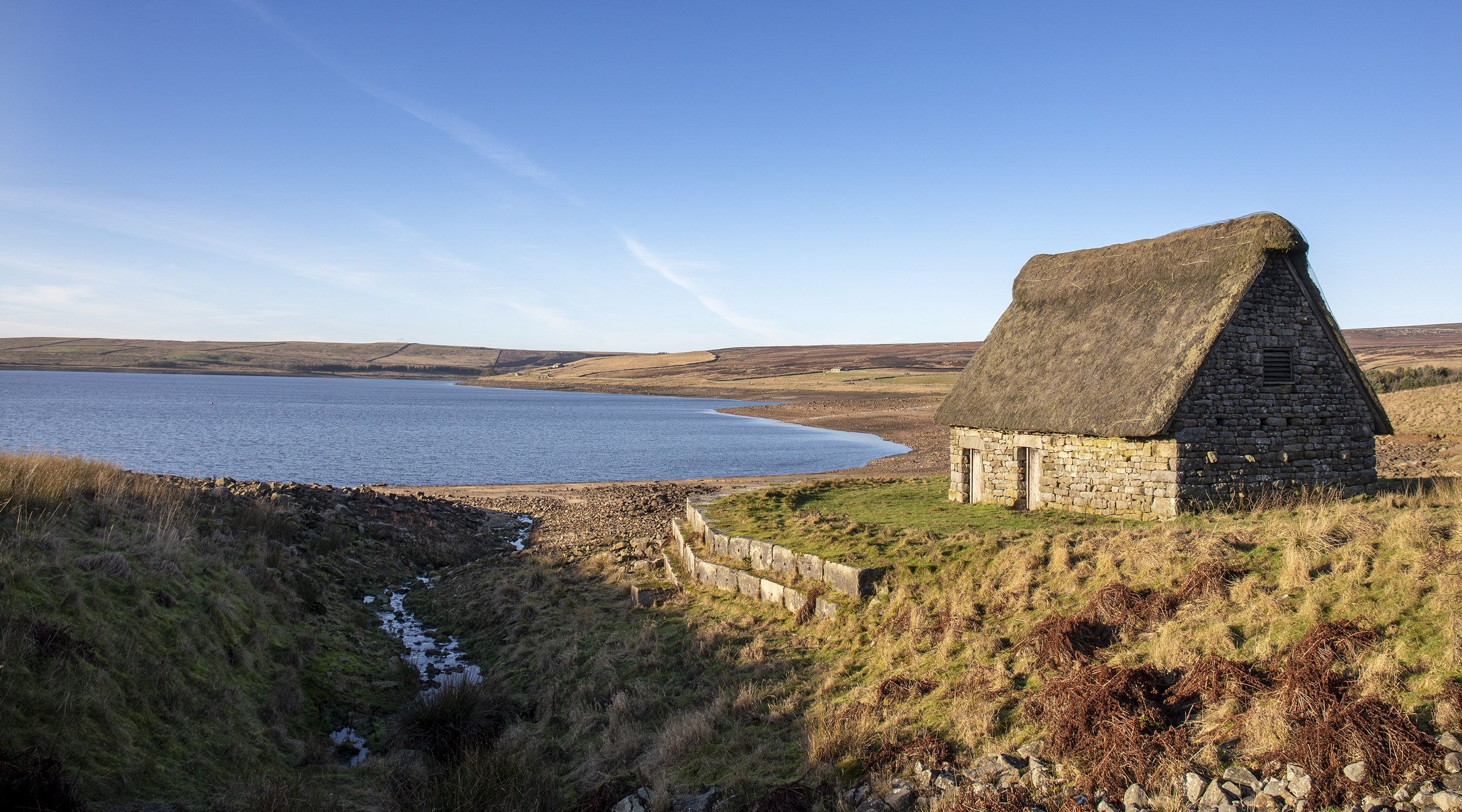
The grade-II listed Cruck barn at Grimwith reservoir

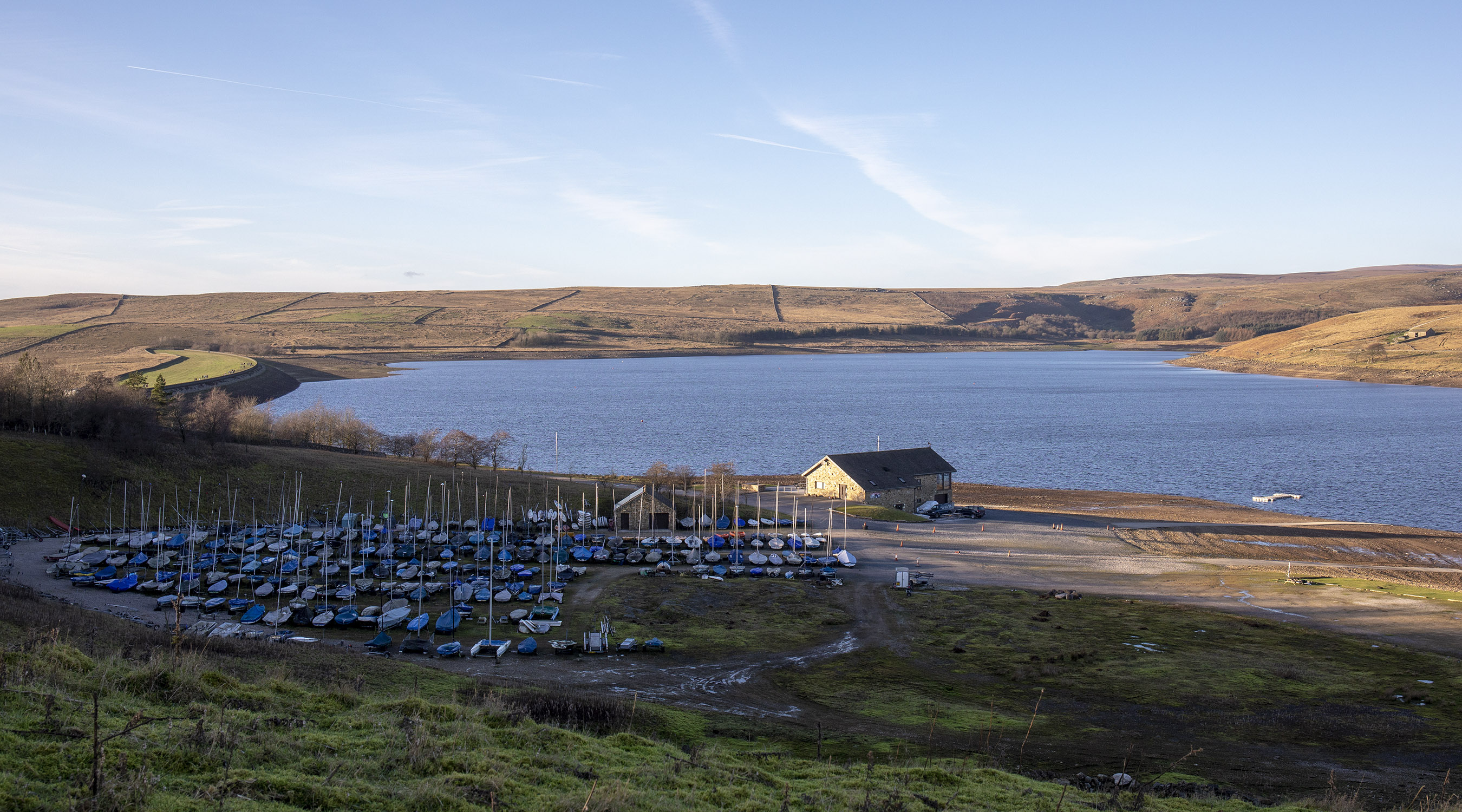
Yorkshire Dales Sailing Club at Grimwith

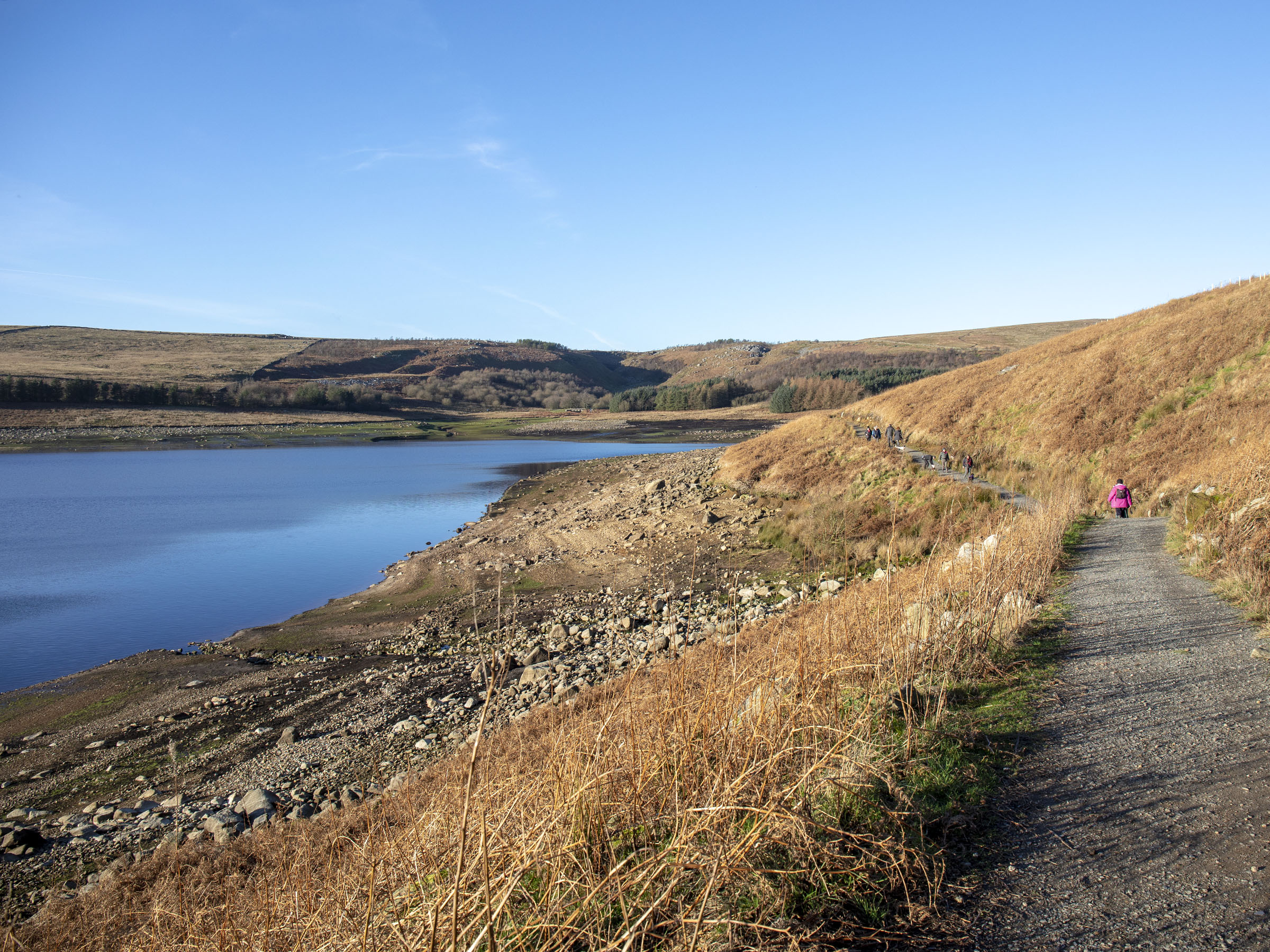
Footpath around Grimwith
