= Hebden, North Yorkshire =

Village and civil parish in North Yorkshire, England

Coordinates: 54°03′48″N 1°57′43″W

Hebden
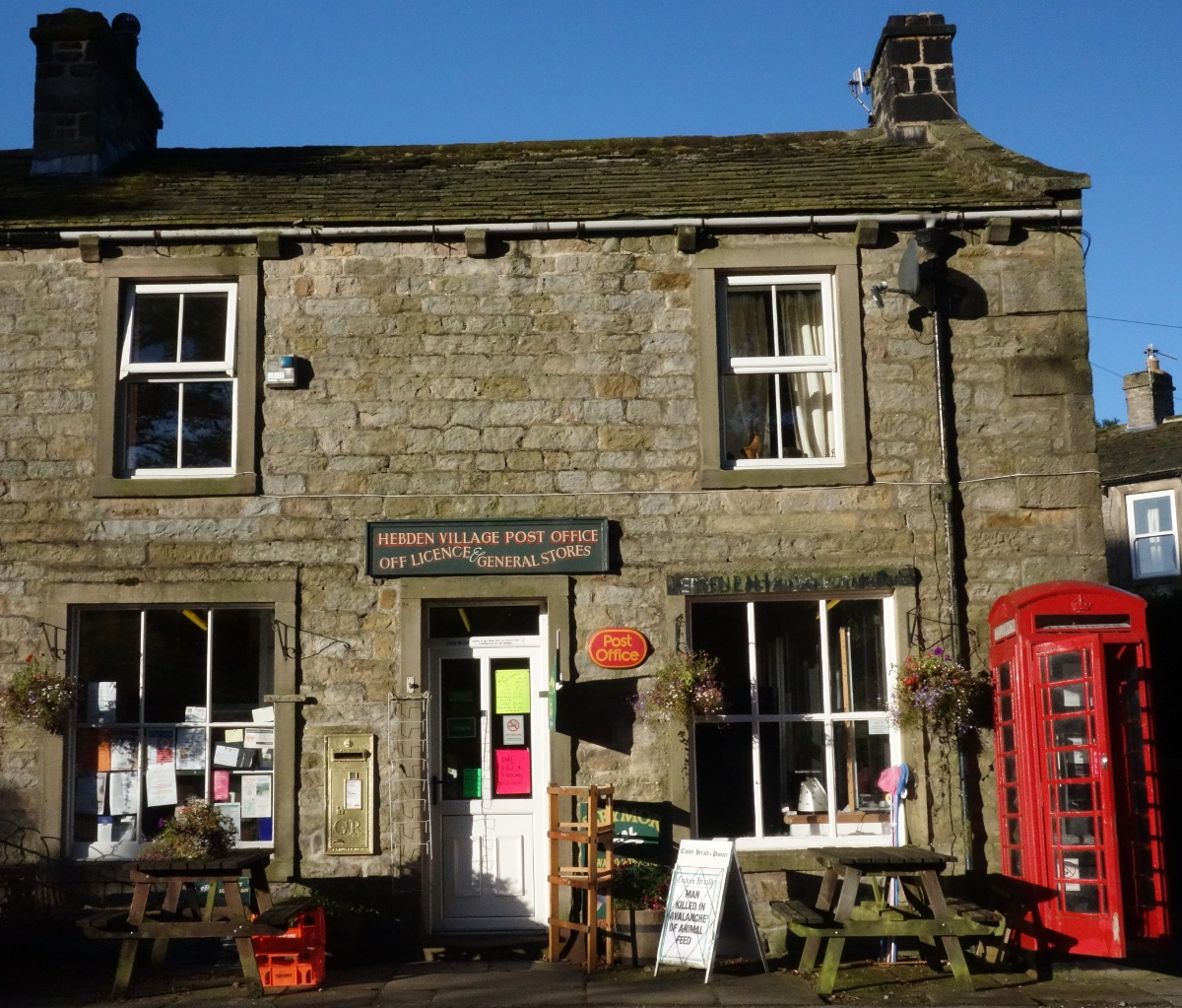
- Hebden Post Office (now closed)

- Location within North Yorkshire
- Area: 5.6 sq mi (15 km^{2})
- Population: 246 (2011 census)
  - Density: 44/sq mi (17/km^{2})
- OS grid reference: SE02596317
  - London: 190 mi (310 km) SSE
- Civil parish: Hebden
- Unitary authority: North Yorkshire
- Ceremonial county: North Yorkshire
- Region: Yorkshire and the Humber
- Country: England
- Sovereign state: United Kingdom
- Post town: SKIPTON
- Postcode district: BD23
- Dialling code: 01756
- Police: North Yorkshire
- Fire: North Yorkshire
- Ambulance: Yorkshire
- UK Parliament: Skipton and Ripon

Hebden (/ˈhɛb.dən/ HEB-dərn) is a village and civil parish in the county of North Yorkshire, England, and one of four villages in the ecclesiastical parish of Linton. It lies near Grimwith Reservoir and Grassington, in Wharfedale in the Yorkshire Dales National Park. In 2011 it had a population of 246.

Hebden has a church, a hotel and public house, a tea room, a community hall, and is served by buses. Until 1983 it had a primary school. Hebden straddles a cross roads. The east–west B6265 road connects it with Grassington 1.7 miles (2.7 km) to the west, and from there south to the market town of Skipton, 11.5 miles (18.5 km) from Hebden. To the east, the road crosses a bridge over Hebden Gill, built in 1827, and thence over the watershed to Pateley Bridge in Nidderdale, 8.5 miles (13.7 km) distant.

Main Street, the village high street, continues south as Mill Lane, towards the bank of the River Wharfe and the villages of Hartlington and Burnsall, the latter being just over 2 miles (3.2 km) away. The road to the north runs to the small hamlet of Hole Bottom, from there continuing as a track onto Grassington Moor.

The layout of the village largely originates from manorial times, but during the 19th century the village grew to become a substantial industrial community with lead mining and a textile mill as the main sources of employment. Since then it has reverted to a rural community, and is a focal point for walkers and cyclists wishing to enjoy the local countryside.

== History ==
The name Hebden may be derived from either heope, Old English for a rose-hip or heopa, Old English for a bramble, and dene, Old English for a valley, or from the Scandinavian Hebban, a topographical description of a ridge forming an elevated site above a small valley. Two Bronze Age stone circles and remnants of huts on the moors above the village show that the area has been settled since earliest times, and a hoard of 33 silver dinari dating from 30 to 170 AD found in a local field indicates that the Romans had a presence. The hoard is now on display at the Craven Museum & Gallery. An Iron Age or Romano-British settlement has been tentatively identified on the banks of Gate Up Gill on the moors to the north-west of the village. Place names such as Scale Haw indicate the Norse left their influence. There is no documentary record of the area until a mention in the Domesday Book of 1086, in which the settlement was referred to as Hebedene held by Osbern d'Arques, of Thorpe Arch. At the time of the Conquest the land was held by Dreng, which is a Nordic name.

Hebden Manor was owned by the Tempest family from the middle of the fifteenth century, but it wasn't seen as an integral part of their estates, being regularly mortgaged. Finally, in 1589 it was purchased by three individual, who claimed a share of the manorial rights according to the value of their purchase, and in doing so becoming what was to be known as "Trust Lords". For the next two hundred years or so, the share of manorial rights was tightly bound to the value of the freehold held, and as ownership changed so the Trust Lords changed. In the middle of the nineteenth century the Trust Lords benefited considerably from the mineral rights and the enclosures of the manorial waste. Until the end of the nineteenth century much of Hebden was owned by absentee landlords.

During medieval times, an important east–west droving route used to move sheep between winter pastures around Fountains Abbey and summer pastures around Malham, crossed the Hebden Beck at Hebden. It broadly followed the line of the North Craven Fault avoiding the moorland peat bogs, and became a busy packhorse route for traders.

Although no property in the village is older than the early 17th century, its layout reflects its development in medieval times as a planned village. Eight toft compartments are discernible to the west of Main Street, and the outline of the four surrounding common fields, now divided, may be identified from the pattern of dry stone walls. The fields were largely arable, providing the village with most of its food requirements, but are now farmed exclusively for pasture and hay. The village manor house was on land now occupied by Hebden Hall at the south end of Main Street. The moors to the north-west of the village were enclosed in 1857.

The last stretch of Hebden Beck before it reaches the River Wharfe was used to power a corn mill in the Middle Ages, and corn milling survived into the middle of the 19th century. In the 14th century Fountains Abbey had a fulling mill in the village. In 1792 a three-storey textile mill was built a little way above the corn mill. It originally had a capacity of 22 spinning frames and was productive until about 1872 when it was driven out of business by the more efficient stream-driven machinery of the Industrial Revolution. At its peak, the mill employed more than 70 men, women, and children. The building was subsequently used for a variety of purposes including a roller skating rink and animal feed-stuff manufacturing before it was demolished in 1967.

Lead mining on Grassington Moor became important in the 18th century, and as a result of the mines' success, a number of the mine owners promoted the provision of the Grassington to Pateley Bridge turnpike road, which was begun in 1760 and provided an all-weather route across the moors for wagons. From the early 19th century Hebden was a dormitory village for some miners, contributing to the population rising to more than 500 in the 1830s. In the early 1850s profitable mines were established in the parish to the north of the village on veins associated with Grassington Moor, which helped sustain the population. Although some activity continued until 1888, the accessible ore was largely exhausted by 1865, and the population declined to a low of 199 in 1901.

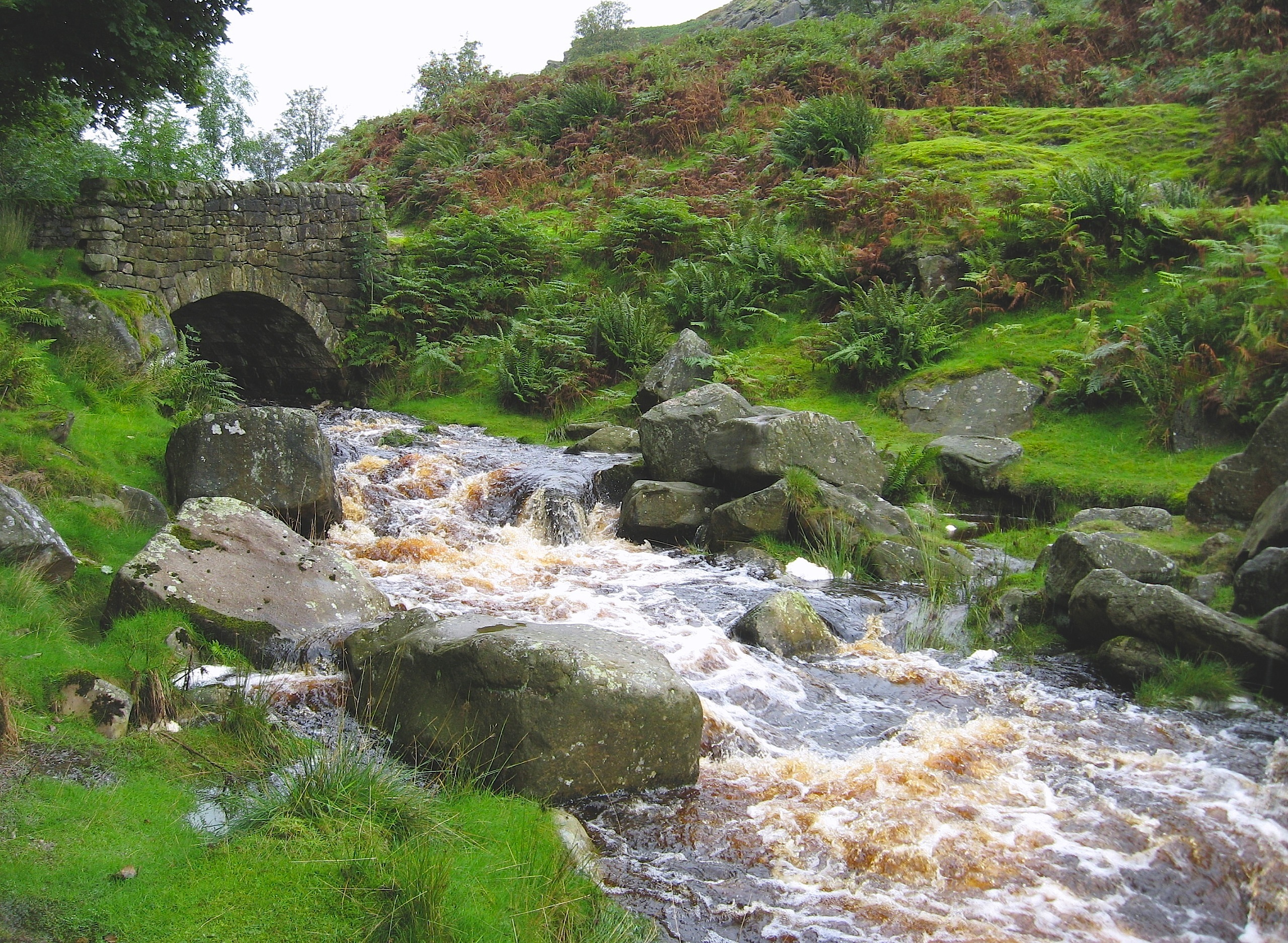
Miners' Bridge over Hebden Beck

As the Hebden Trust Lords shared the mineral royalties, the mines brought prosperity which gave rise to the remodelling and redevelopment of much of the village. Green Terrace, which includes the old post office, was built in the 1870s, and Main Street was transformed from a back lane into the high street. The village school, with working clock and bell tower, was built in 1874, and the Methodist Chapel was rebuilt in 1876 to front onto Main Street. The stone-built Ibbotson Institute, now the community hall, was completed in 1903.

The coming of the Yorkshire Dales Railway to Threshfield in 1902 opened up Hebden as a destination for day visitors and holiday makers. A purpose-built timber guest house was opened in 1909 at the south end of the village by the Co-operative Holiday Association, founded by Thomas Arthur Leonard. It passed into private hands in 1960, and continued as a holiday centre until 1990, mainly catering for school parties. It was demolished in 2016 and replaced with a private residence.

The village stores and post office shut at the end of 2013 after 100 years of trading. The gold painted George V Type E wall post box was removed from the outside wall of the post office (now an exhibit in the Postal Museum), and replaced with a modern gold painted lamp box a few metres away; and the K6 Tudor Crown phone box was decommissioned, and set up at the cross-roads as a street ornament.

Although it now has a number of second homes, holiday cottages and commuters, with eight working farms, a fish farm, coach and haulage companies, Hebden is a township that remains economically active on its own even with growing tourisim.

== Governance ==
Hebden was a township in the parish of Linton, part of the east division of the wapentake of Staincliffe and Ewcross in the historic county of the West Riding of Yorkshire. It became a separate civil parish in Skipton Rural District in 1866 as a result of the enactment of the Poor Law Amendment Act 1866. In 1974 it was transferred to Craven District in North Yorkshire as the result of the enactment of the Local Government Act 1972., and in 2023 it was transferred again to become part of North Yorkshire Council.

Hebden lies in the Skipton and Ripon Parliamentary Constituency, a seat held by Sir Julian Smith MP for the Conservatives; and in the Wharfedale division of North Yorkshire Council, represented by Conservative party member, Richard Foster. As it is located within the Yorkshire Dales National Park, the Yorkshire Dales National Park Authority is the local planning authority for the area.

Hebden has a parish council with five independent members supported by a parish clerk. Elections are held every four years, the most recent in 2022. Council meetings are held every six weeks. The parish council's activities are largely funded by income from parish lands in the form of rent, grants, and easements.

== Geography ==
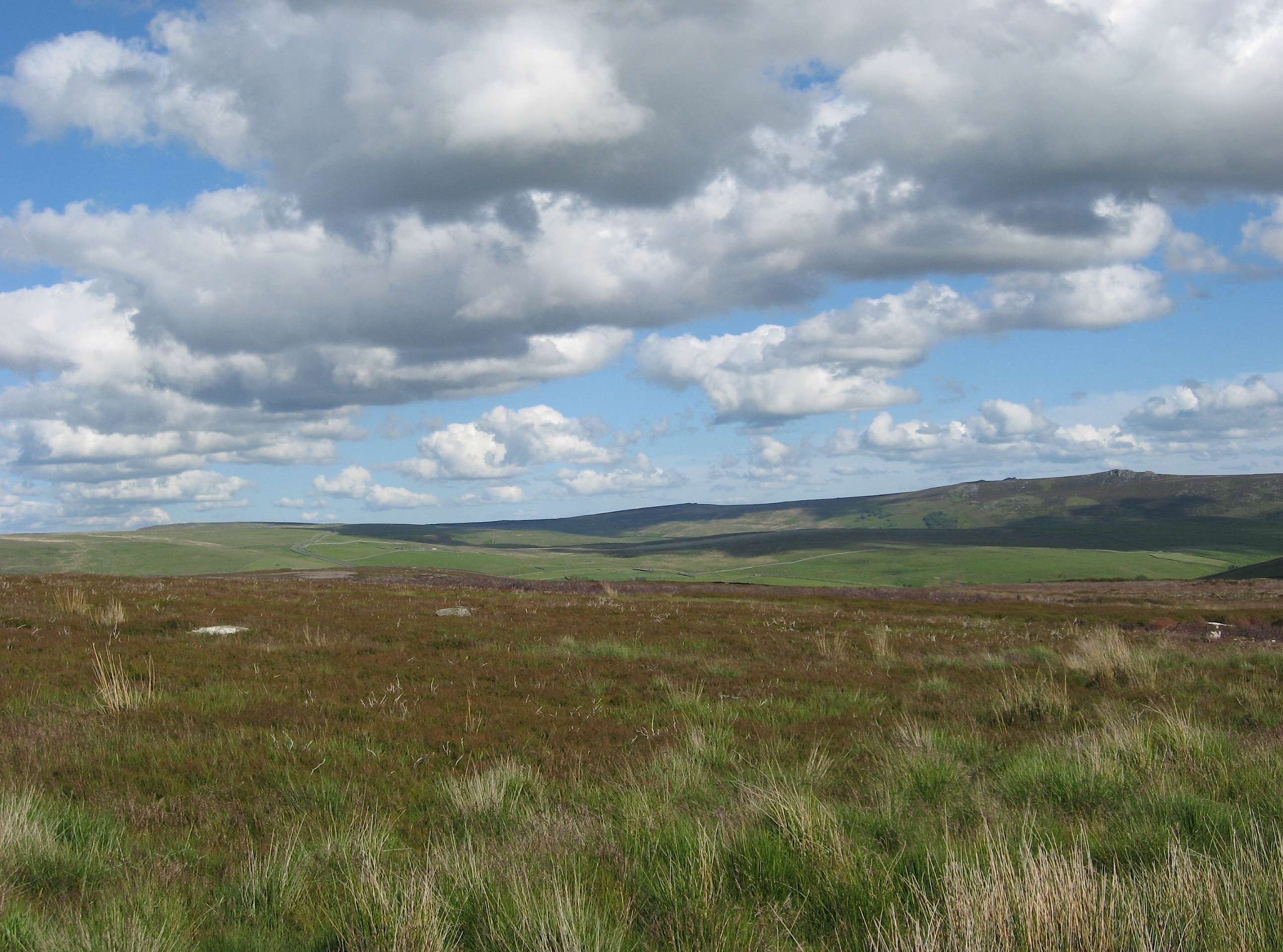
Moorland to the north-east of the village

The south-east boundary of Hebden parish is the River Wharfe, 500 feet (150 m) above sea level, and the north-east boundary runs along the Wharfedale-Nidderdale watershed, reaching a height of 1,770 feet (540 m). The upper section of the eastern boundary is Gate Up Gill, one of the main inflows of Grimwith Reservoir. The parish approximates a parallelogram in shape, averaging under 1.5 miles (2.4 km) in width and some 5 miles (8.0 km) in length. To the north, the land rises away from Hebden to the 2,310 feet (700 m) summit of Great Whernside, some 7 miles (11 km) distant.

The habitations and main farming areas are largely confined to the Wharfe valley, and the rest of the parish is mainly rough moorland pasture. The village is on one of several branches of the North Craven Fault where Hebden Beck emerges from the moors through a steep-sided valley into the Wharfe valley, on an ancient east–west route.

Hebden Beck rises on Grassington Moor some 2.5 miles (4.0 km) from the village, but the main valley continues north as a dry valley, until it reaches Mossdale Caverns and the upper flanks of Great Whernside.

The geology is dominated by rocks Carboniferous in age but, as the parish straddles a complex section of the North Craven Fault, it is varied. To the north-east of the village the rocks are predominantly Bowland sandstones and shales, and to the south-east are largely massive limestones. The River Wharfe runs across the limestone, through an impressive gorge at Loup Scar. The mineral veins of the Bowland series have been exploited for lead ore.

== Population change ==
Population changes in Hebden since 1801
Year	1801	1811	1821	1831	1841	1851	1861	1871	1881	1891	1901	1911	1921	1931	1939	1951	1961	1971	1981	1991	2001	2011
Population	342	402	377	491	480	460	435	362	313	209	199	225	343	289	386	252	221	210	213	202	216	246
% change	---	+14.6	-6.2	+30.2	-2.2	-4.1	-5.4	-16.8	-13.5	-33.2	-4.8	+13.1	+52.4	-15.7	+33.7	-34.7	-12.3	-5.0	+1.4	-5.2	+6.9	+13.9
Sources: Vision of Britain, Online Historical Population Reports, 2001 UK Census Data, 2011 North Yorkshire County Council

Note that the population figure for 1921 was distorted by 65 visitors staying at the CHA Guest House, and that for 1939 by over 40 people staying at the CHA Guest House and by evacuee children billeted in the village.

== Landmarks ==
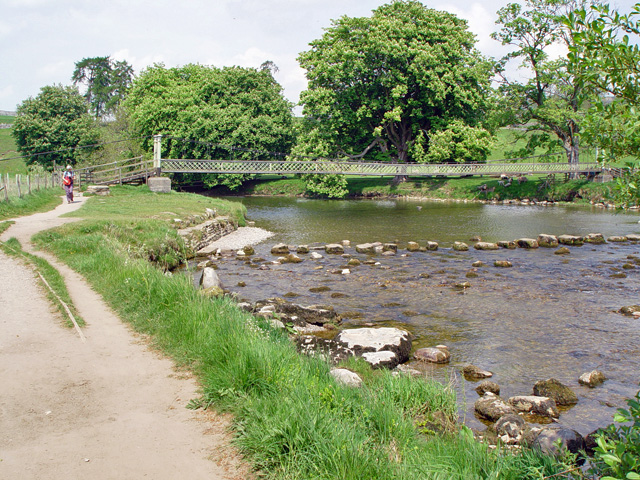
The River Wharfe is crossed by a suspension footbridge and stepping stones

Hebden is a centre for walking and cycling in Upper Wharfedale. It has an inn, and a tea room catering for visitors, and within walking distance are the Dales villages of Appletreewick, Burnsall, Thorpe, Linton and Grassington. A gold post box near the old post office commemorates the 2012 Olympic Games rowing gold medal won by Andrew Triggs Hodge, who grew up in the village. Grimwith Reservoir, used for wind surfing, dinghy sailing, and bird watching, is 2 miles (3.2 km) to the east along the B6265, and 2 miles (3.2 km) further is Stump Cross Caverns – a show cave. The Dales Cycle Way passes through Hebden on its way from Appletreewick to Grassington.

Because of its proximity to the Craven Fault, the scenery is varied. The Dales Way passes through the parish along the banks of the River Wharfe between Burnsall and Grassington, mainly through limestone pastures but occasionally, as at Loup Scar and Linton Falls, through limestone gorges and past waterfalls. It crosses the Wharfe at Hebden on a wrapped steel-cable suspension bridge, a few yards upstream of the reconstructed course of medieval stepping stones. The bridge was built in 1885 by local blacksmith William Bell, and paid for by public subscription. Made of recycled materials, it originally had a central supporting pier (the base of which can be seen in low water conditions), that was removed when the span was raised in 1937 after being damaged in a heavy flood. The bridge has been conserved and is a landmark on the river-side path.

Hebden Beck flows down from Grassington Moor, which is dominated by the long-abandoned remains of the lead mining industry, through a rugged and wooded gill, past the hamlet of Hole Bottom, made famous by William Riley's novel Jerry and Ben, and then over the 16 feet (5 m) Scala Falls. A popular walk is an 8 miles (13 km) circuit up to Grassington Moor, and thence to Grassington, returning along the River Wharfe. South of Hebden, the edge of the limestone is heralded by a number of text-book examples of reef knolls, including Elbolton Hill, Stebden Hill, and Kail Hill, which are the conical remnants of limestone reef structures. Behind the reef knolls is a large expanse of Grassington Grit grouse moor, Thorpe Fell and Burnsall Fell, where walking may be enjoyed – especially around the edges.

== Conservation area ==
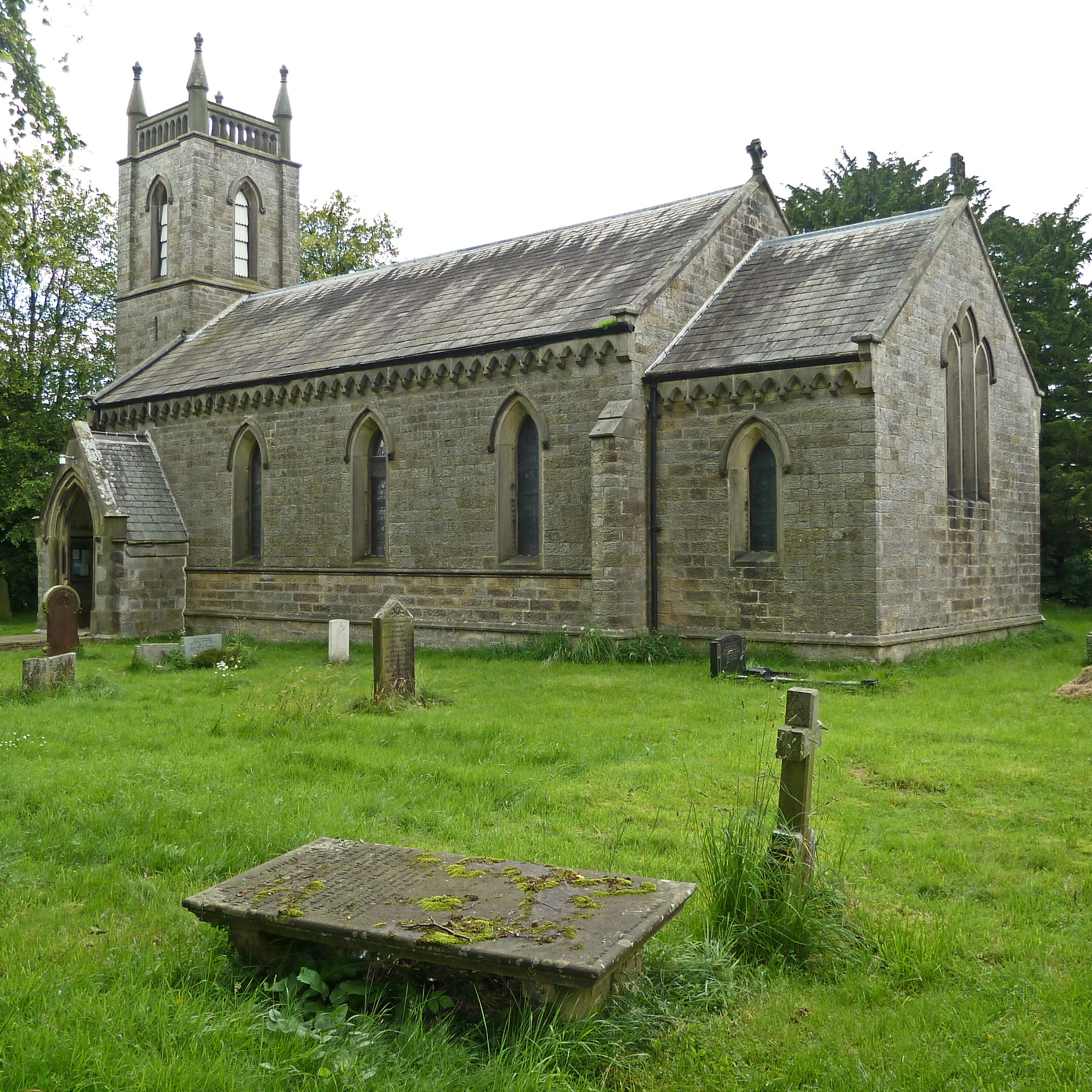
St Peter's Church

In 2006 the Yorkshire Dales National Park Authority designated Hebden a conservation area. In the proposal it was stated that:

"The special character of Hebden is defined by a historic settlement pattern of great significance together with a collection of important listed buildings and a group of unlisted buildings which, although essentially vernacular and humble in architectural terms, combine well together to create a harmonious and generally high quality environment of buildings, open spaces and tree cover. In addition, the setting is very distinctive with natural topography of surrounding hills and adjacent steep sided valley combining with a man made agricultural landscape of some age and significance in its own right."

== Sport ==
Hebden Sports Day is held annually on August Bank Holiday. Dating back to the nineteenth century, Hebden Sports provides a variety of running races, novelty races, and entertainments for all age groups. It has hosted the professional Hebden Fell Race since at least 1922, which is a regular feature on the British Open Fell Runners Association calendar. The village cricket team, the Hebden Hedgehogs plays in the Underdales League, a league with its own set of idiosyncratic rules. Rugby union, football, and crown green bowling facilities are available at Grassington and Threshfield.

== Religion ==
Hebden is part of the ecclesiastical parish of Linton in the Skipton deanery of the Ripon episcopal area of the Diocese of Leeds. St. Peter's Church was built as a chapel of ease to St Michael and All Angels Church in Linton in 1841 at a cost of £760. Until then, parishioners attended church in Linton a distance of some 1.5 mi (2.4 km) using the church path across fields to stepping stones crossing the Wharfe. St Peter's Church was built on land donated by the Rev Henry Bailey, and was designed by the curate, the Rev. John Pearson Fearon, in the Gothic Revival style. It is a Grade II listed building. Its pipe organ was built by Harrison & Harrison of Durham and was dedicated in 1894. It was refurbished in 2010 by A. Carter of Wakefield, and has been granted a Grade II Historic Organ Certificate. The churchyard contains one Commonwealth war grave, that of a Royal Air Force airman of the Second World War. Regular services were suspended in March 2020 due to COVID-19 restrictions, and at May 2022 there were no plans to resume them.

In the nineteenth century, a large majority of population were non-conformist. The Methodist church, originally built in 1812 and rebuilt in 1876, was part of the Skipton and Grassington Methodist Circuit but closed in October 2016 with its membership transferring to Grassington Methodist Church. A Primitive Methodist Chapel was built in Chapel Lane in 1838, but this was replaced by housing in about 1930.

== Public services and transport ==
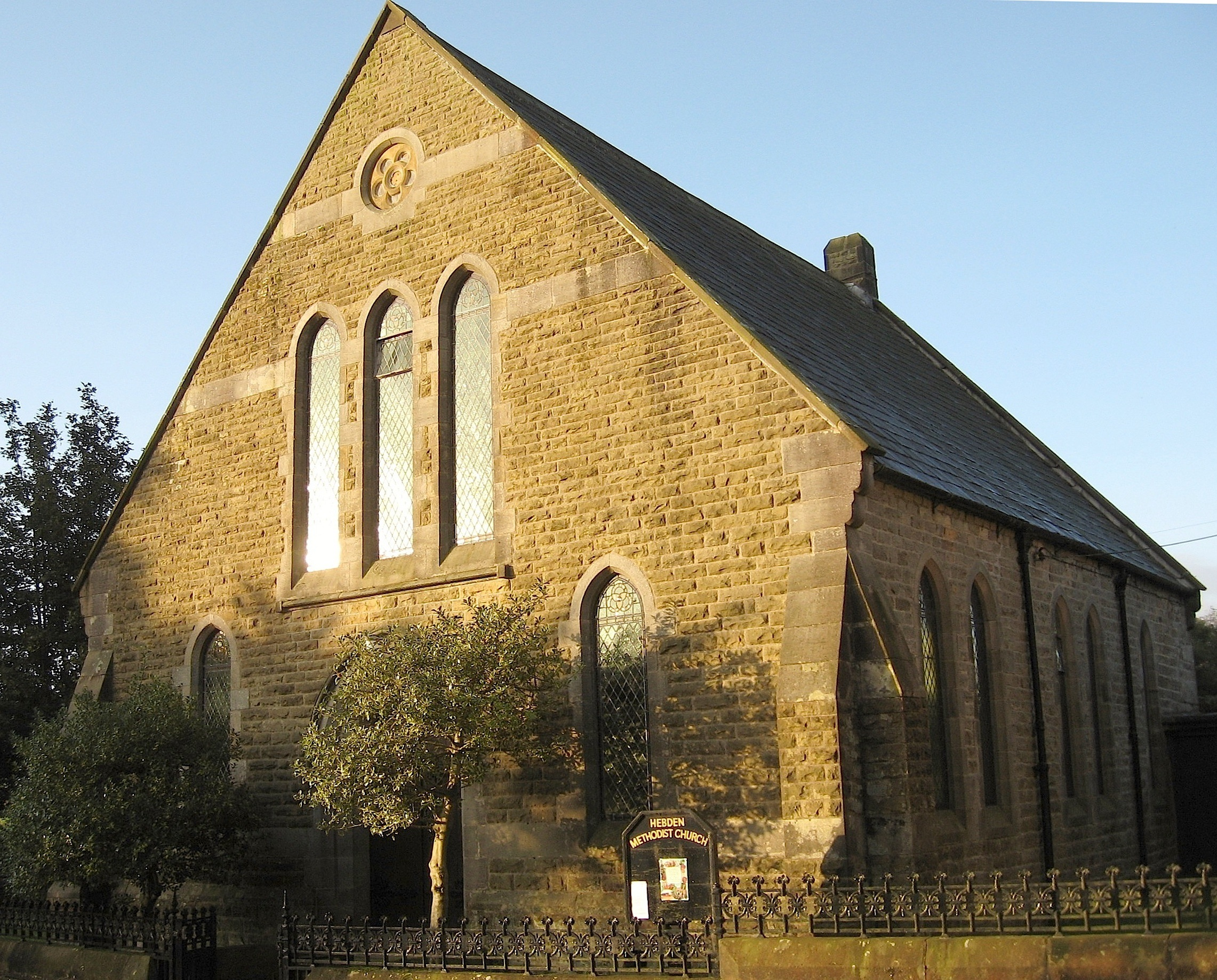
Methodist Church, now disused

Local medical facilities are provided by Ilkley Moor and Grassington Primary Care Services, primarily from a medical centre in Grassington, and hospital facilities are provided by the Airedale NHS Trust at Airedale General Hospital in Steeton, some 18 miles (29 km) away. Ambulance services are provided by the Yorkshire Ambulance Service NHS Trust, who have an ambulance station in Grassington.

Fire fighting services are provided by North Yorkshire Fire and Rescue Services, who maintain a retained fire station in Grassington, and cave and mountain rescue services are provided by the Upper Wharfedale Fell Rescue Association, based in Grassington. Police Services are provided by the North Yorkshire Police. The nearest staffed police station is in Skipton, but there is a team of officers based in Grassington.

Regional television services are provided by BBC Yorkshire and Yorkshire Television. Cable Internet access is not available in the village, but FFTC broadband is available from Openreach.

Electricity distribution is the responsibility of Northern Powergrid (Yorkshire), which is wholly owned by Berkshire Hathaway Energy. There is no domestic gas mains supply. Water is supplied by Yorkshire Water from Embsay Reservoir. Yorkshire Water is responsible for wastewater disposal, and a small-scale treatment plant is located adjacent to the River Wharfe south of Hebden Beck. Refuse collection is handled by Craven District Council, and North Yorkshire County Council provides a household waste and recycling centre at Skibeden, between Bolton Abbey and Skipton.

The village is served by a minibus service to Ilkley via Grassington three times a week. The nearest railway station is in Skipton, with services to Leeds, Bradford, Carlisle, and Carnforth, and the nearest international airport is Leeds Bradford Airport.

== See also ==
- Listed buildings in Hebden, North Yorkshire
