= Vlădeni, Botoșani =

Vlădeni
- Commune
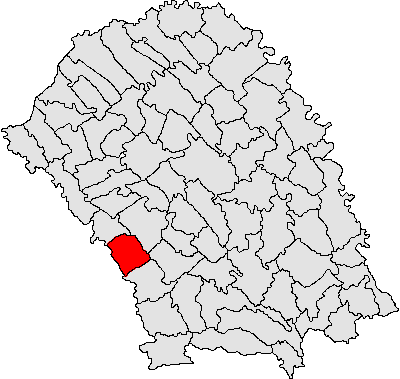
- Location in Botoșani County

- Location in Romania
- Coordinates: 47°43′N 26°32′E
- Country: Romania
- County: Botoșani
- Subdivisions: Vlădeni, Brehuiești, Hrișcani, Huțani, Mândrești

Government
  - Mayor (2024–2028): Voicu Murariu (PSD)
- Area: 64.61 km^{2} (24.95 sq mi)
- Elevation: 290 m (950 ft)
- Population (2021-12-01): 4,561
  - Density: 70.59/km^{2} (182.8/sq mi)
- Time zone: UTC+02:00 (EET)
  - Summer (DST): UTC+03:00 (EEST)
- Postal code: 717460
- Area code: +40 x31
- Vehicle reg.: BT

Vlădeni is a commune in Botoșani County, Western Moldavia, Romania. It is composed of five villages: Brehuiești, Hrișcani, Huțani, Mândrești and Vlădeni.
