= List of crossings of the River Wharfe =

This is a list of crossings of the River Wharfe, a river in Yorkshire, England, in the downstream direction from the Oughtershaw Beck to the confluence with the River Ouse.

== List of crossings ==
Crossing	Carries	Location	Coordinates	Type	Picture
=== Craven, North Yorkshire ===
Oughtershaw Footbridge	Public footpath	Oughtershaw			Footbridge_at_Oughtershaw,_across_the_Oughtershaw_Beck_-_geograph.org.uk_-_5542181
Beckermonds Bridge	Public road	Beckermonds			
Deepdale Bridge	Public road	Deepdale			
Yockenthwaite Bridge	Farm track and public footpath	Yockenthwaite		Stone arch bridge	
Hubberholme Bridge	Public road	Hubberholme			
Buckden Bridge	Public road	Buckden			
Starbotton footbridge	Dales Way footpath	Starbotton		Wooden footbridge	
Kettlewell Bridge	B6160 road	Kettlewell			
Conistone Bridge	Public road	Conistone			
Grassington Bridge	Public road	Grassington			
Tin Bridge	Footpath	Grassington			
Linton Stepping Stones	Footpath	Linton, North Yorkshire		Stepping stones	
Hebden Suspension Bridge	Footpath	Hebden		Suspension bridge	
Burnsall Bridge	Public road	Burnsall			
Drebley stepping stones	Public footpath	Between Drebley and Howgill		Stepping stones	
Barden Bridge	Public road	Barden			
Strid footbridge	Dales Way public footpath	Bolton Abbey			
Bolton Abbey Pavilion footbridge	Dales Way public footpath	Bolton Abbey			
Bolton Abbey stepping stones	Dales Way public footpath	Bolton Abbey			
Bolton Abbey footbridge	Dales Way public footpath	Bolton Abbey			
Bolton Abbey old bridge	Public road	Bolton Abbey		Stone arch	
Bolton Abbey new bridge	A59	Bolton Abbey			
=== Bradford, West Yorkshire and Craven, North Yorkshire ===
West Hall suspension bridge	Footpath	Addingham, West Yorkshire		Suspension bridge	
=== Bradford, West Yorkshire ===
Ilkley Old Bridge	Footpath	Ilkley			
Ilkley New Bridge	Public road	Ilkley			
Denton Road footbridge	Footpath	Ilkley			
Ilkley Stepping stones	Public Footpath	Ilkley			
=== Bradford, West Yorkshire and Harrogate, North Yorkshire ===
Denton Road road bridge	Public road	Ilkley			
Stepping stones	Public Footpath	Burley-in-Wharfedale		Stepping stones, unusable at high water levels. The Burley Bridge Association is campaigning to have a footbridge built here, as has been requested by local residents since 1898.	
=== Leeds, West Yorkshire ===
Otley Bridge	Public road	Otley			
Otley footbridge	Footpath	Otley			
=== Leeds, West Yorkshire and Harrogate, North Yorkshire ===
Pool Bridge	A658	Pool-in-Wharfedale			
Arthington Viaduct	Leeds-Harrogate-York railway line	Arthington			
Harewood Bridge	A61	Harewood			
Woodhall Bridge	Public footpath	East Keswick			
=== Leeds, West Yorkshire ===
Linton Bridge	Public road	Collingham and Linton			
Ings footbridge	Public footpath	Wetherby			
Wetherby Bridge	A661 Boston Road	Wetherby and Micklethwaite			
First Wetherby Bypass bridge	A168 Privas Way	Wetherby			
Second Wetherby Bypass bridge	A1(M)	Wetherby			
Leys Lane bridge	Private access road	Boston Spa			
Thorp Arch Bridge	Public road	Boston Spa and Thorp Arch			
=== Leeds, West Yorkshire and Selby, North Yorkshire ===
Thorp Arch railway bridge	Formerly part of the Harrogate - Church Fenton Railway Line, it was not connected to anything after the railway line was decommissioned. It could therefore not be used as a crossing at that time. However, in 2018 it was renovated and re-opened as part of a new housing development.	Thorp Arch Trading Estate			
=== Selby, North Yorkshire ===
Tadcaster Viaduct	Public footpath	Tadcaster			
Tadcaster Bridge	A659	Tadcaster			
Tadcaster bypass bridge	A64	Tadcaster			Path_under_the_A64_-_geograph.org.uk_-_5307324
Ulleskelf railway bridge	Dearne Valley Line and York and Selby Lines	Ulleskelf			
Ozendyke railway bridge	East Coast Main Line	Ozendyke			
