= Oughtershaw =

Hamlet in North Yorkshire, England

Coordinates: 54.229710°N 2.202830°W

- Location within North Yorkshire
- OS grid reference: SD868815
- Civil parish: Buckden
- Unitary authority: North Yorkshire
- Ceremonial county: North Yorkshire
- Region: Yorkshire and the Humber
- Country: England
- Sovereign state: United Kingdom
- Post town: SKIPTON
- Postcode district: BD23
- Police: North Yorkshire
- Fire: North Yorkshire
- Ambulance: Yorkshire

Oughtershaw is a hamlet in the Yorkshire Dales, North Yorkshire, England. It lies on a road it shares with other small villages; Deepdale, Yockenthwaite and Hubberholme, which traverses the watershed between Upper Wharfedale\Langstrothdale and Wensleydale over Fleet Moss into Gayle. The hamlet lies at 1,180 feet (360 m) above sea level. The name is first recorded in 1241 as Huctredsdale, and stems from Uhtred's copse, a personal name. It has had many spellings down the years, being known variously as Ughtershaw, Ughtirshey, Owghtershawe, and Outershaw in the 19th century.

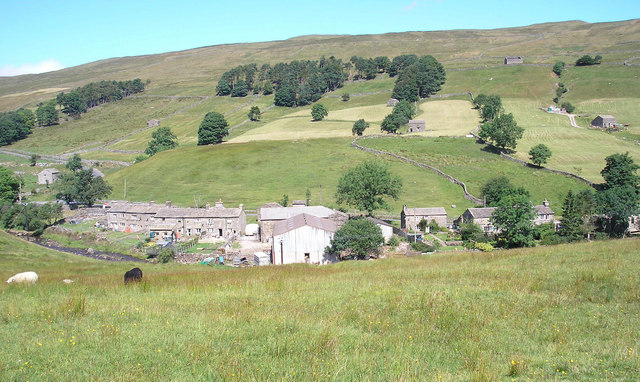
View of Oughtershaw

Contrary to popular belief the river running past Oughtershaw is not the Wharfe; it is Oughtershaw Beck, which runs down to Beckermonds and then merges with Greenfield Beck to source the River Wharfe at the Langstrothdale chase.

Oughtershaw is one of the hamlets on the Dales Way a long-distance walk that starts in the West Yorkshire town of Ilkley and travels 79 miles (127 km) to Windermere, in Cumbria.

Oughtershaw. A piece of bleakest Yorkshire, but smiling in the sunshine through its bare miles of tufted grass. The air had the sharp sweetness which is found only on the top-most Pennines. — James Herriot

== See also ==
- Listed buildings in Buckden, North Yorkshire
