= Lady Anne's Way =

Long-distance path in Northern England

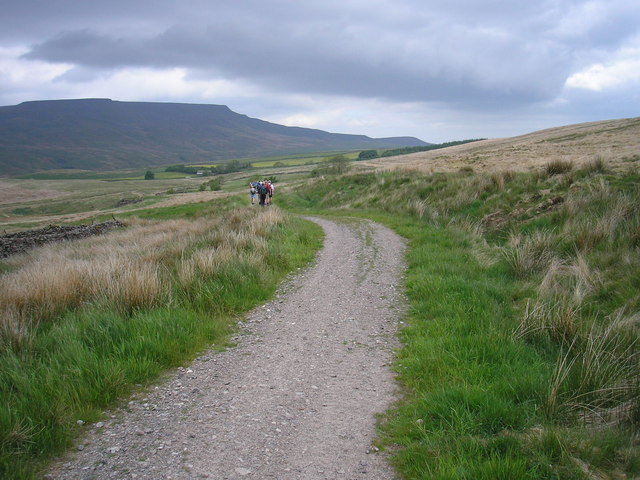
- The old road from Mallerstang to Wensleydale, to the north of Garsdale
- Length: 100 mi (160 km)
- Location: Northern England
- Established: 1995
- Trailheads: Skipton Castle, North Yorkshire53.9640°N 2.0154°W; Penrith, Cumbria; 54.6635°N 2.7512°W
- Use: Hiking
- Difficulty: Challenging
- Season: All year
- Waymark: A lion's head symbol
- Website: www.ladyannesway.co.uk

Lady Anne's Way is a 100-mile (160 km) hiking route between Skipton and Penrith in Northern England. The trail is punctuated by houses and towers once owned by the Clifford family, but is named after Lady Anne Clifford who renovated and repaired the buildings in the 17th century. The route goes through Grassington, Buckden, Askrigg, Garsdale Head, Kirkby Stephen, Great Ormside, Appleby-in-Westmorland and Penrith.

== Background ==
In 1605, Lady Anne Clifford was disinherited from her father's estates by his death and the act of it passing on to the next male heir. 38 years later, it came to her when the last males in her family lineage died, and despite ideas that females could not accede to baronies, she became Baroness Clifford of Westmorland and Vecsey. She then set about repairing the castles and houses that she owned and when completed, she continually travelled between them all taking her household retinue with her.

In 1995, Sheila Gordon created a path that linked all the castles and fortified structures that Lady Anne Clifford used to travel between. The walk crosses from Airedale, Wharfedale and Wensleydale in North Yorkshire to the Vale of Eden in Cumbria. The route links Skipton Castle in North Yorkshire with Brougham Castle in Cumbria. The route then continues into Penrith, where it finishes.

As the route became more popular with walkers, funding was obtained to allow the entire route to be waymarked in 2018.

== Route ==
Advertised as a route from south to north, the walk starts at Skipton Castle in Airedale. It goes north in conjunction with the Dales High Way, then east, and north east through the villages of Embsay and Eastby before reaching its first marked point of Barden Tower. It then follows the River Wharfe northwards in conjunction with the Dales Way to Grassington but veering away slightly by going through Hebden. From Grassington, the route travels across the eastern side of Wharfedale through to Kettlewell and Buckden. Here the route goes due north across Langstrothdale Chase and going over Stake Moss before dropping into Wensleydale and the village of Worton.

At Nappa, the path takes a westwards course through Wensleydale going through Askrigg, Sedbusk and the town of Hawes. It then goes north west through Appersett and Hellgill, where it crosses into the Upper Eden Valley. It proceeds north through Mallerstang up to Nateby, through Kirkby Stephen, then north east to Brough across the River Belah. At Brough, the path turns westwards again through Warcop and Great Ormside, where it turns northwards again to head to Appleby-in-Westmorland. It then heads north to Long Marton and Kirkby Thore, before going west again to visit the hall and castle at Brougham. The final stretch is a short distance into Penrith, where the walk ends in the town centre.

The buildings that are waymarkers on the route are; Skipton Castle, Barden Tower, Nappa Hall, Pendragon Castle, Brough Castle, Appleby Castle, Brougham Castle and Brougham Hall.

=== Stages ===
Stage	Between	Distance	Cumulative distance
1	Skipton to Grassington	15.5 miles (24.9 km)	15.5 miles (24.9 km)
2	Grassington to Buckden	12.5 miles (20.1 km)	28 miles (45 km)
3	Buckden to Hawes	18 miles (29 km)	46 miles (74 km)
4	Hawes to Kirkby Stephen	17.25 miles (27.76 km)	63.25 miles (101.79 km)
5	Kirkby Stephen to Appleby-in-Westmorland	16.5 miles (26.6 km)	79.75 miles (128.35 km)
6	Appleby-in-Westmorland to Penrith	19.75 miles (31.78 km)	99.5 miles (160.1 km)

A nine-day pace is also covered in the guidebooks.

== Connecting trails ==
The route starts at Skipton where it connects with the Dales High Way and it also connects with the Dales Way at Barden Tower, its second point of building interest after Skipton Castle.
