= Cray, North Yorkshire =

Hamlet in North Yorkshire, England

Coordinates: 54.20844°N 2.09061°W

Cray
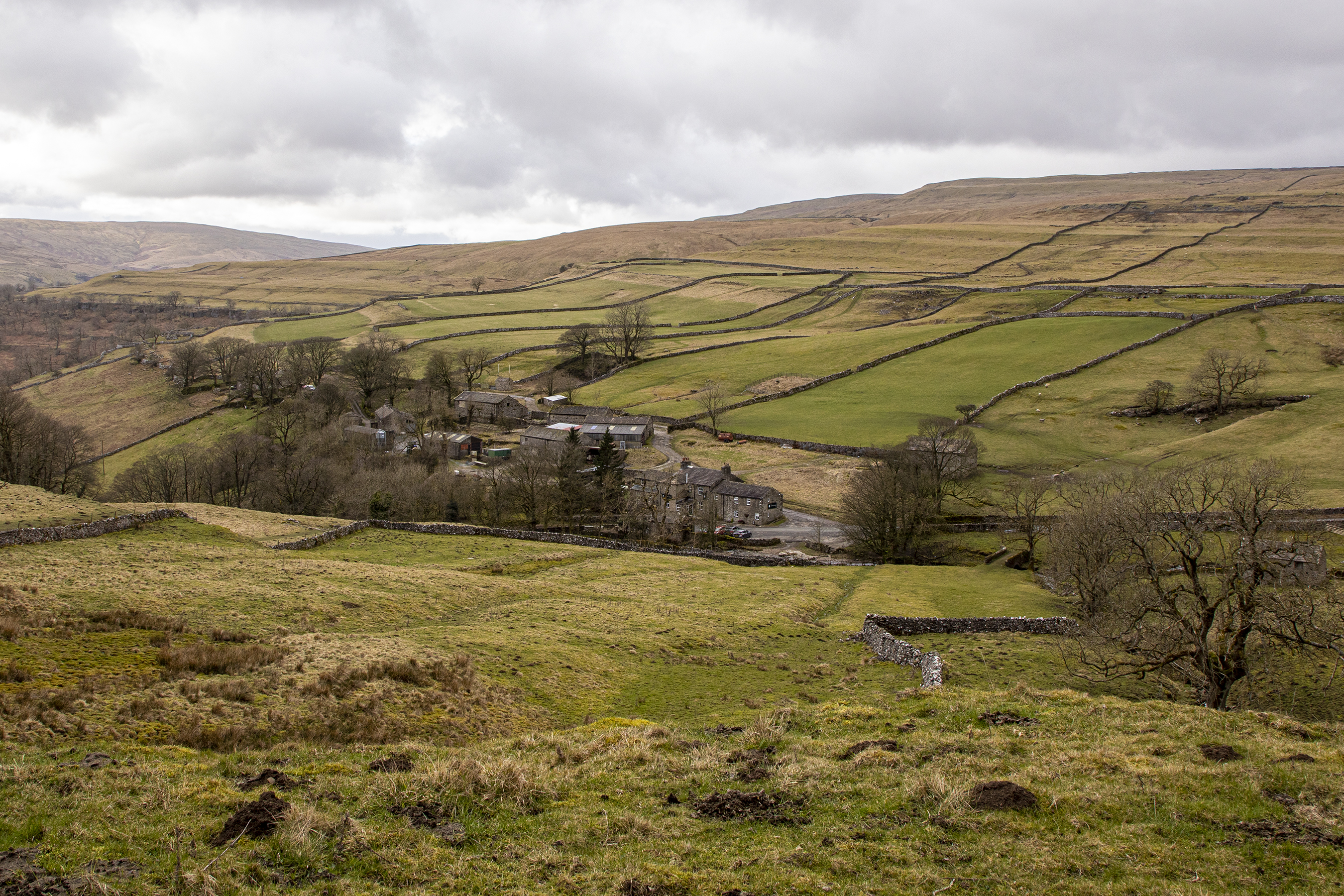
- Cray from the western slopes of Buckden Pike

- Location within North Yorkshire
- OS grid reference: SD941791
- Civil parish: Buckden
- Unitary authority: North Yorkshire
- Ceremonial county: North Yorkshire
- Region: Yorkshire and the Humber
- Country: England
- Sovereign state: United Kingdom
- Post town: SKIPTON
- Postcode district: BD23
- Police: North Yorkshire
- Fire: North Yorkshire
- Ambulance: Yorkshire
- UK Parliament: Skipton and Ripon

Cray is a hamlet on the B6160 road on a steep hill above Wharfedale in the Yorkshire Dales, North Yorkshire, England. It is near Buckden and the River Wharfe. It is a very popular walking area and is renowned for several waterfalls known collectively as Cray Waterfalls. The name of the settlement derives from the same name for the nearby beck (Cray Gill); Old Welsh Crei, meaning fresh. The settlement was not mentioned in the Domesday Book, first being recorded in 1202 when a meadow was granted as a fine to William de Arches at Creigate.

Historically, the hamlet was in the township of Buckden, in the Parish of Arncliffe, which was in wapentake of Staincliffe. It is in the civil parish of Buckden, and is represented at Westminster as part of the Skipton and Ripon Constituency.

The road leading through the hamlet was originally part of a Roman Road linking Bainbridge with Ilkley, which descended from Kidstones Pass to the north of Cray, past the hamlet, and through Rakes Wood to the east to get to Buckden.

The hamlet has one pub, The White Lion Inn, which is said to have derived its name from the roar and foam from High Cray Falls (above the village to the east), which in extreme windy weather, forces the water back up the waterfall. There are other pubs in the area (The George Inn in Hubberholme, and The Buck Inn in Buckden), but the White Lion is recognised as being the highest pub in Upper Wharfedale. A public house is believed to have been on the site since the 14th century, and was known to be a drovers inn.

On 5 July 2014, the Tour de France Stage 1 from Leeds to Harrogate passed through the village. The village was also the start of the Category 4 climb, Côte de Cray, which lasted for 1.6 kilometres (0.99 mi) at an average gradient of 7.1%. The climb was at the 68 kilometres (42 mi) point in the stage and Benoit Jarrier was the first rider over the top to claim the only point available for the King of the Mountain Competition The climb was repeated during the Elite Men's race in the 2019 UCI Road World Championships.

The long-distance walk, a Pennine Journey, passes through Cray, with Alfred Wainwright noting that the hamlet should be "... amongst the most loveliest of Wharfedale's hamlets, yet it is not, and it is difficult to explain why it falls short of the high standard you have come to expect".
