= Fleet Moss =

Upland area of the Yorkshire Dales, England

- Blanket bog
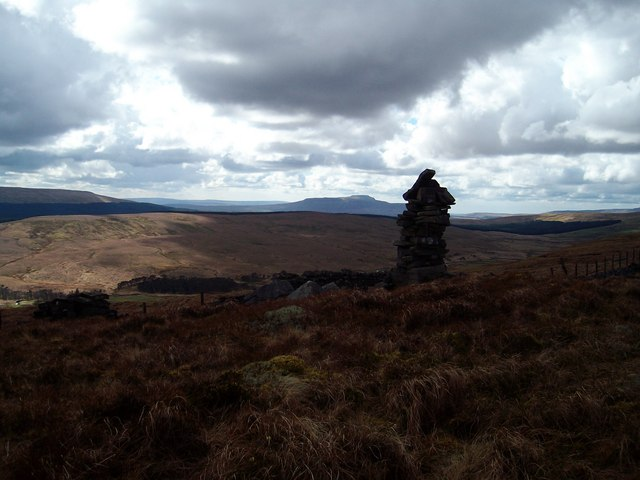
- Fleet Moss Edge, looking west (Ingleborough in the distance)

- Location within North Yorkshire
- Coordinates: 54.247°N 2.203°W
- Grid position: SD860836
- Location: Wharfedale/Wensleydale, North Yorkshire, England
- Range: Pennines
- Age: Neolithic
- Elevation: 560 m (1,850 ft)
- Topo map: OS Explorer OL2

Fleet Moss is an upland area separating Wharfedale from Wensleydale in North Yorkshire, England. The area is 1,850 ft (560 m) above sea level (although nearby peaks and the road achieve higher altitudes). Fleet Moss is noted for its peat blanket bog, which has been dated to the Neolithic period. The area is ombrotrophic; this means it needs rain, hail snow and fog for its nutrients. Fleet Moss is known as the most eroded blanket bog in all of Yorkshire; because of its observable damage, it is known colloquially as The Somme, and as such, is visible from space.

It is also known recreationally for the road which runs north/south through Fleet Moss between Oughtershaw and Gayle, which is the highest (paved) road in Yorkshire. Fleet Moss is a popular waypoint with cyclists and fell runners.

== Description ==
The name Fleet Moss derives from Old Scandinavian, fljót mos, literally stream bog. Fleet Moss, which is 2.5 miles (4 km) north of the village of Oughtershaw, is an important peatland that stores carbon, filters water and provides a habitat for wildlife and fauna. A road extends over the hill from Oughtershaw to Gayle, then Hawes, which passes Fleet Moss, but attains a slightly higher altitude than the bog of 1,932 ft (589 m). Whilst this road connects with Cam Fell High Road at the northern end of Fleet Moss (originally the route of the turnpike between Richmond and Lancaster), the road past Fleet Moss from the south was only built in 1887. Fleet Moss itself, sits between Dodd Fell 2,200 ft (670 m) to the west, and Jeffery Pot Hill 1,955 ft (596 m) to the east, with Fleet Moss Tarn being its highest area.

== Blanket bog ==
Fleet Moss is a blanket bog, which gains all its nutrients through rainfall (or snow, hail and fog) rather than being fed by streams (ombrotrophic), with the depth of the peat at over 11 feet (3.5 m) in places. A cross-section of the peat contains the Glen Garry tephra layer, a sediment laid down by a volcanic event which provides a chronological marker. (Note: Tephra, is volcanic material which has been carbon-dated to a specific volcanic eruption, in this case, an eruption in Iceland around 2167 bp, with a margin of error set at 244 years (2210–1966 bp). Fleet Moss is an important marker of this event and has been linked to other sites across the United Kingdom, since the tephra layer was first discovered in Glen Garry (hence the name), in 1989.) This proves that the first peat in the bog was laid down in the early to mid Neolithic period, around 4,000–2,000 BC. Before the bog was there, the site was part of an ancient woodland, most likely elm trees by carbon dating the pollen in the ground. This wood suffered disease and was progressively cleared by the people who lived in the area.

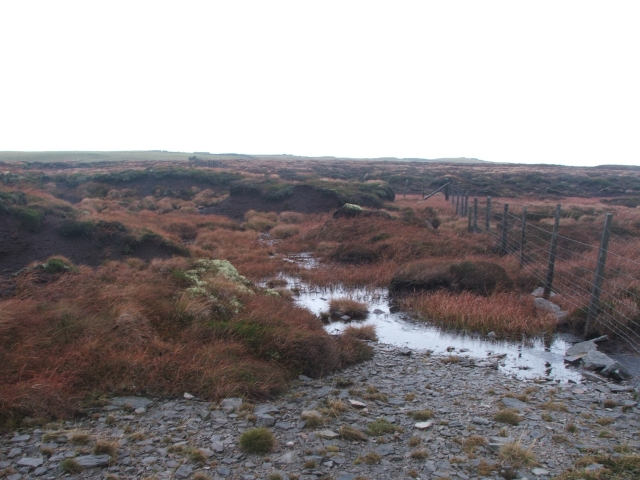
Fleet Moss – the channels are washed away peat

Whilst no accurate data exists for the rainfall on Fleet Moss, modelling based on similar peaks in the area (Top Duerley and Snaizeholme), suggests that Fleet Moss is subject to between 71 in (1,800 mm) and 79 in (2,000 mm) of rainfall per year. The rate of peat erosion is not wholly affected by weather, but more likely down to human interaction with the landscape, with conservatives estimates placing the rate of sediment loss to be 15 tonnes (17 tons) per year suspended in water. Manual drainage of the peatland was a normal agricultural practice, which involved creating ditches (called grips) that would drain off the water, (natural drainage channels are known as gullies). The moors were drained gradually, but from 1840 onwards, the individual pockets of land were purchased by one family, who set about draining them intensively. This process was increased dramatically in the 1950s to provide grazing land for cattle. The draining has created scarring and columns of peat (hags) where the peat used to be, which has left the landscape looking akin to a war zone; so much so, that the location is known as The Somme and the distinctive features make it visible from space. Areas to the north east of Fleet Moss are used extensively for grazing animals and shooting, with the south western side of the site noted for its peatland.

Since 2017, Pennine PeatLIFE has been actively restoring blanket bogs in Northern England, including Fleet Moss. The programme has seen the installation of sediment traps and dams across 253 acres (102.5 ha) to prevent erosion and the run-off of acidic peaty water into streams and rivers. Rewetting of the bog also helps to prevent flooding in downstream areas. By the spring of 2019, more than 990 acres (400 ha) of peatland at Fleet Moss had been restored, with the expectation that 1,200 acres (500 ha) would be completed by 2022.

Most water from Fleet Moss drains eastwards through Bardale, Cragdale and Roedale to feed Semerwater, however, some water spills east into the River Wharfe via Barden Beck. In extremes of rainfall, the peat-riddled water spills into the Wharfe via Oughtershaw Beck. All of these actions are making the waters in the rivers more acidic.

== Flora and fauna ==
Plants present at Fleet Moss include Aulacomnium palustre, sphagnum moss, hare's-tail cottongrass, heather, Hypnum cupressiforme, bog asphodel, Racomitrium lanuginosum, sundew, Trichophorum cespitosum, bilberry, and cross-leaved heath.

Stonechat, curlew, dunlin, golden plover, short-eared owl, and white-throated dipper have been observed at Fleet Moss.

== Stone working ==
There is evidence to show that during the Neolithic period, limestone pavements were cleared by those who lived in the area. This may have contributed to the development of the bog. Small-scale quarrying was undertaken in the area in post-Medieval times; though this is thought to have been for roads and walls near to, or on, Fleet Moss.

== Fleet Moss Tarn ==
Fleet Moss Tarn is a very small upland lake at the eastern end of Fleet Moss, at a height of 1,896 ft (578 m). Mapping indicates that water from Fleet Moss Tarn flows north eastwards into Bardale Beck, which feeds into Semerwater. Fleet Moss Tarn is one of only a handful of natural lakes in the Yorkshire Dales (Malham Tarn, Semerwater, Birkdale Tarn, Eshton Tarn and Oughtershaw Tarn), as the underlying limestone is highly permeable. Where lakes do occur, is due to the underlying rocks being eroded to reveal impermeable rocks below.

The orchid, bog twayblade, was recorded at Fleet Moss Tarn in the 1870s.

== Fleet Moss Road ==
The road over Fleet Moss between Oughtershaw in the south (Wharfedale), and Gayle in the north (Wensleydale), is well known among cyclists for being a tough ascent from either direction. The pass regularly features in the best rides sections of newspapers and cycling magazines, and is also listed as being the highest paved road in Yorkshire.

The road by Fleet Moss is also a waypoint on the annual Fellsman race.
