= Buckden =

Buckden may refer to:

- Buckden, Cambridgeshire
- Buckden, North Yorkshire
