= A Pennine Journey =

A Pennine Journey may refer to:

- A Pennine Journey: The Story of a Long Walk in 1938, 1986 book by Alfred Wainwright
- Pennine Journey, a waymarked trail in northern England inspired by Wainwright's book
