= Church of St Michael and All Angels, Hubberholme =

Coordinates: 54.2001°N 2.1147°W

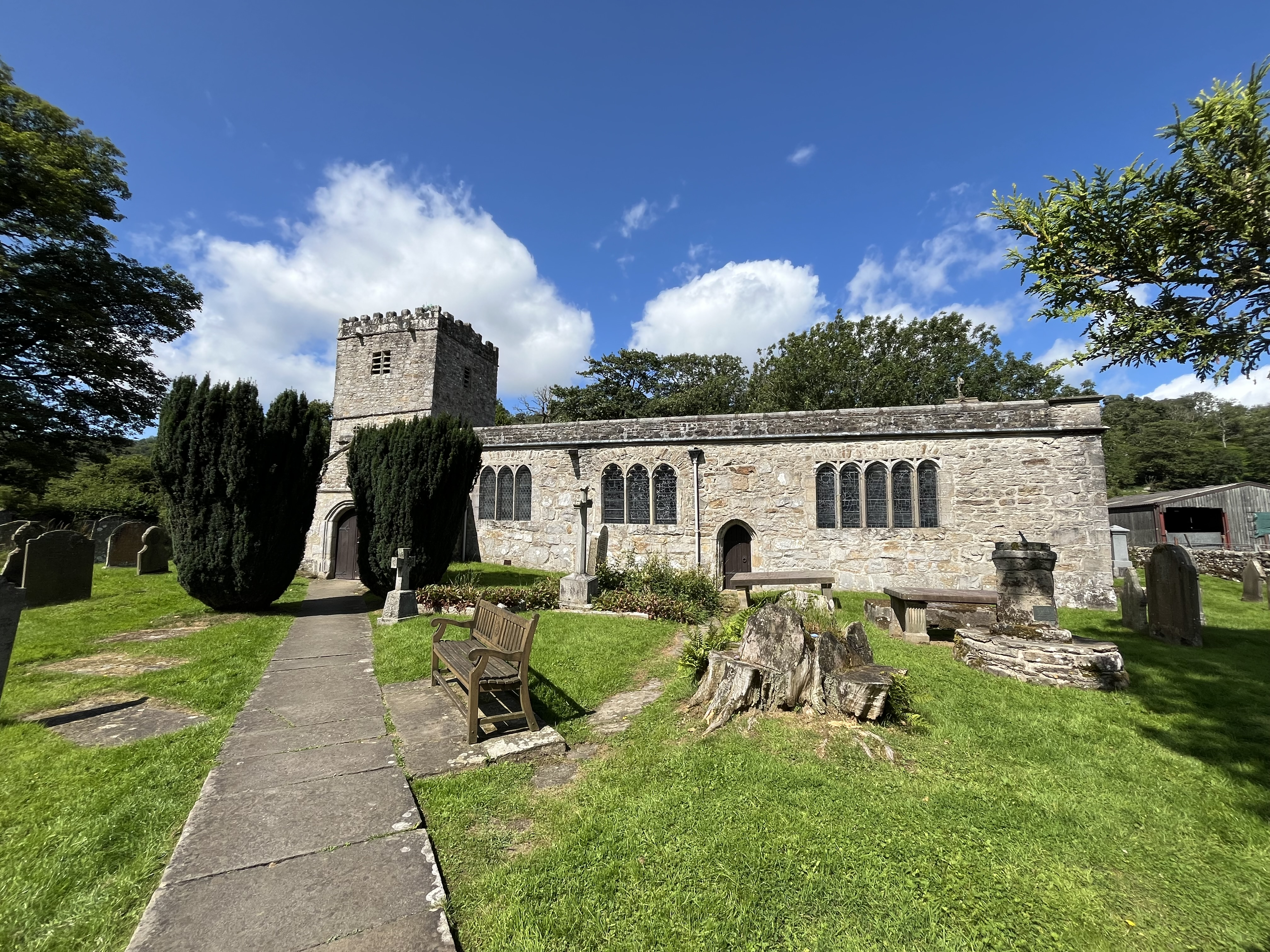

- Location in North Yorkshire
- OS grid reference: SD 926 782
- Location: Hubberholme, Wharfedale, North Yorkshire
- Country: England
- Denomination: Church of England

History
- Dedication: St Michael and All Angels

Architecture
- Heritage designation: Grade II* listed
- Designated: 9 September 1954

Administration
- Diocese: Diocese of Leeds
- Archdeaconry: Richmond and Craven
- Deanery: Skipton
- Parish: Upper Wharfedale and Littondale

St Michael and All Angels is a parish church in the Church of England in Hubberholme, North Yorkshire. It is a Grade II* listed building. The church, and the neighbouring George Inn, were favourite locations of the author J. B. Priestley, whose ashes are buried in the churchyard.

== History ==
The church dates from the 12th century, although some sources suggest it was built on the site of an earlier chapel. The construction of the chapel has been attributed to the de Percys who are said to have built it as a chapel of ease within the confines of their deer park at Langstrothdale Chase. It was largely rebuilt in the 16th and 17th centuries, and restored in the 19th and 20th.

St Michael's, and the neighbouring George Inn, (Note: The George, originally the Hubberholme vicarage, is a Grade II listed building.) were favourite locations of the author J. B. Priestley. Born in Manningham, a suburb of Bradford in West Yorkshire, Priestley was a frequent visitor to Hubberholme which he described as the "smallest, pleasantest place in the world". His ashes are buried in the churchyard and he is commemorated by a plaque in the church. (Note: Priestley's widow, the archaeologist and writer Jacquetta Hawkes, who was his third wife, encountered difficulty when attempting to have his ashes buried at Hubberholme. As Priestley had not been born, lived or died within the parish, he was technically ineligible but an exemption was given by the chancellor of the Diocese of Bradford.) (Note: The plaque reads: 'Remember J. B. Priestley OM 1894–1984 AUTHOR AND DRAMATIST Whose ashes are buried nearby. He loved the Dales and found "Hubberholme one of the smallest and pleasantest places in the world".') (Note: Tom Priestley, Priestley's son, died on Christmas Day 2023 and his ashes are also to be buried in the churchyard at Hubberholme.)

A pane in one of the stained glass windows celebrates George Andrew Hobson, a late Victorian civil engineer who lived in the village. The pane depicts his Victoria Falls Bridge, which crosses the Zambezi River just below the Victoria Falls, between Zimbabwe and Zambia and was constructed in 1905.

The church remains an active church in the parish of Upper Wharfedale and Littondale.

== Architecture and description ==
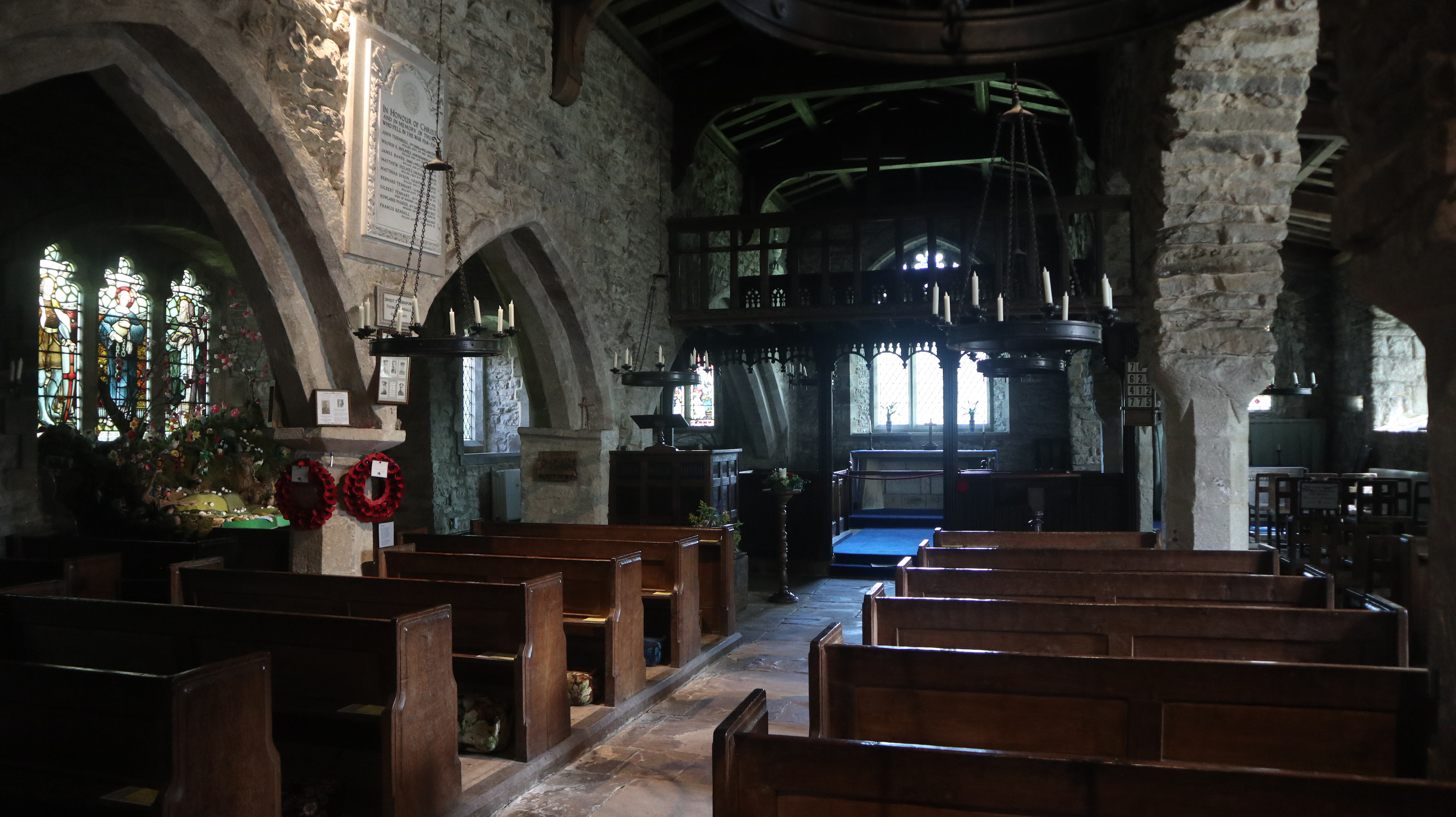
Interior looking to rood screen and altar

St Michael and All Angels’ is built of limestone rubble under a lead roof and comprises a nave, chancel, aisles, a southern porch and a western tower. The interior is notable for its painted rood screen which dates from 1558 and survived Elizabethan attempts to remove such structures. (Note: The only other example in Yorkshire is at the Church of St Oswald, Flamborough.) It was restored in the 20th century. The church also has furnishings, including the pews, choir stalls and chairs, by Robert "Mouseman" Thompson, a 20th-century furniture maker, which are decorated with his Mouse motif. A Jacobean altar, originally in the chapel at University College, Oxford, was donated to the church in 1862. The church is a Grade II* listed building.

== See also ==
- Grade II* listed churches in North Yorkshire (district)
- Listed buildings in Buckden, North Yorkshire

== Sources ==
- Marsh, Terry (2022). Walking the Dales Way: Ilkley to Bowness-on-Windermere Through the Yorkshire Dales (3 ed.). Kendal, UK: Cicerone Press. ISBN 978-1-783-62875-9.
- Thomas, Chris; Thomas, Peter (2005). Yorkshire's Historic Pubs. Cheltenham, UK: The History Press. ISBN 978-0-750-95429-7.
- Wainwright, Martin (2011). The English Village. London, UK: Michael O'Mara Books. ISBN 978-1-843-17794-4.
- Wilson, Scott (2016). Resting Places: The Burial Sites of More Than 14,000 Famous Persons (3 ed.). Jefferson, North Carolina, USA: McFarland & Company. ISBN 978-1-476-62599-7.
