= Buckden Pike =

Peak in the Yorkshire Dales, England

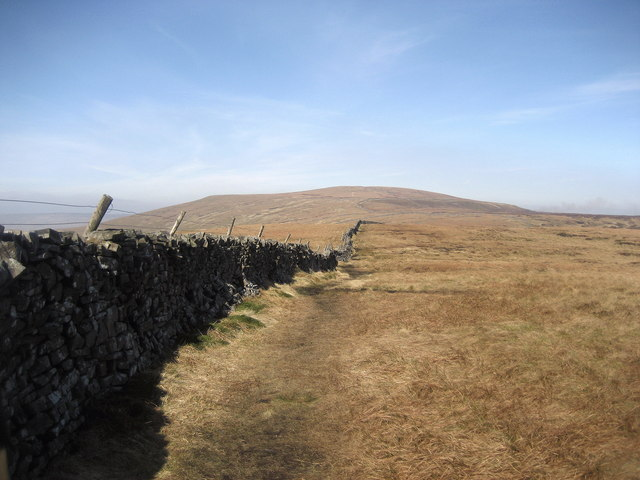
- The hill from Tor Mere Top, a mile to the south.

Highest point
- Elevation: 702 m (2,303 ft)
- Prominence: 207 m (679 ft)
- Parent peak: Great Whernside
- Listing: Hewitt, Marilyn
- Coordinates: 54°12′15.5″N 2°3′32.5″W

Geography
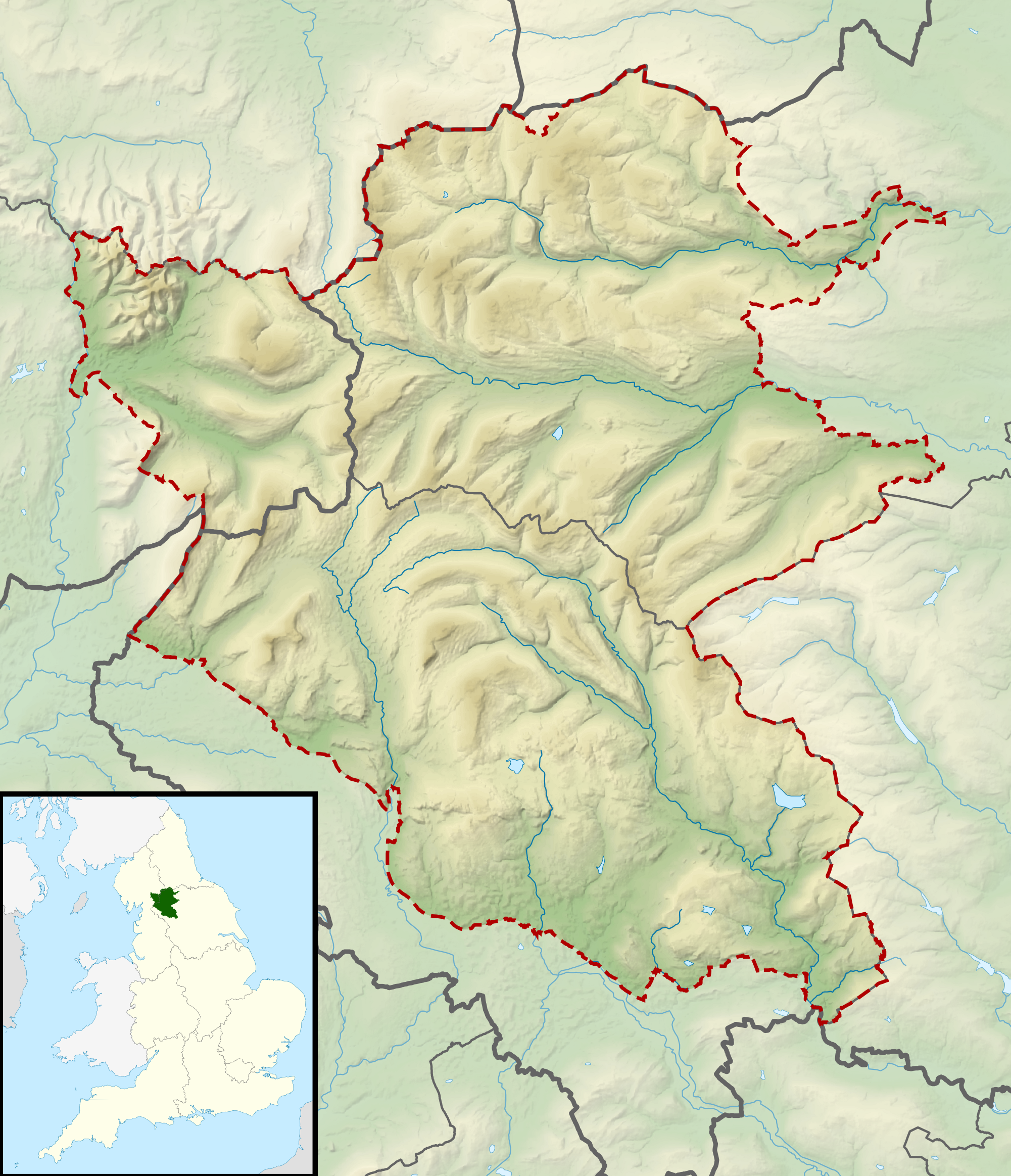
- Location within Yorkshire Dales
- Location: Yorkshire Dales, England
- OS grid: SD961787
- Topo map: OS Outdoor Leisure 30

Buckden Pike is a fell at the head of Wharfedale, a valley in the Yorkshire Dales, that stands above the village of Buckden, England. At 702 metres (2,303 ft), it narrowly misses out on being the highest peak in the area, the title instead going to nearby Great Whernside (704 metres). The summit is marked by a trig point.

== Routes of ascent ==
Buckden Pike offers walks a few different routes. Perhaps the easiest and shortest route up the mountain is a bridleway from Buckden, although this is steep and boggy in parts, and therefore somewhat unsuitable for cyclists and those on horseback.

Another route, on Access Land, follows Buckden Beck as far as the disused Buckden Lead Mine, then joins a Permitted Footpath to the summit.

A longer and more challenging walk is the circular route taking in Buckden, Buckden Pike, Great Whernside and Kettlewell. Walkers can start and finish at either of the car parks in Buckden or Kettlewell - traditionally the leg along the River Wharfe (part of the Dales Way) is completed at the end of the day for an easier finish.

== Buckden Pike Memorial Cross ==
To the south of the summit is a memorial cross, dedicated to the memory of five Polish airmen of the Polish Air Force 18th Polish Operational Training Unit based at RAF Bramcote who crashed their Wellington Bomber on 30 January 1942. The memorial was created by, with help from various locals, the sole survivor of the crash Jozef "Joe" Fusniak, and completed on 8 August 1973. Fusniak died in July 2017.

== The view ==
There are fine views from the summit. The most extensive are to the East and West. To the East is the ridge running from Little Whernside to the summit of Wharfedale's highest peak, Great Whernside. To the West are views into the heart of the Yorkshire Dales, including mountains such as The Yorkshire Three Peaks, as well as closer peaks such as Firth Fell and Yockenthwaite Moor. To be found close to the summit is a large wooden pole, standing vertically; it has a number of large holes focused on different views - this used to be labelled with information cards but is no longer.

== Buckden Pike Fell Race ==
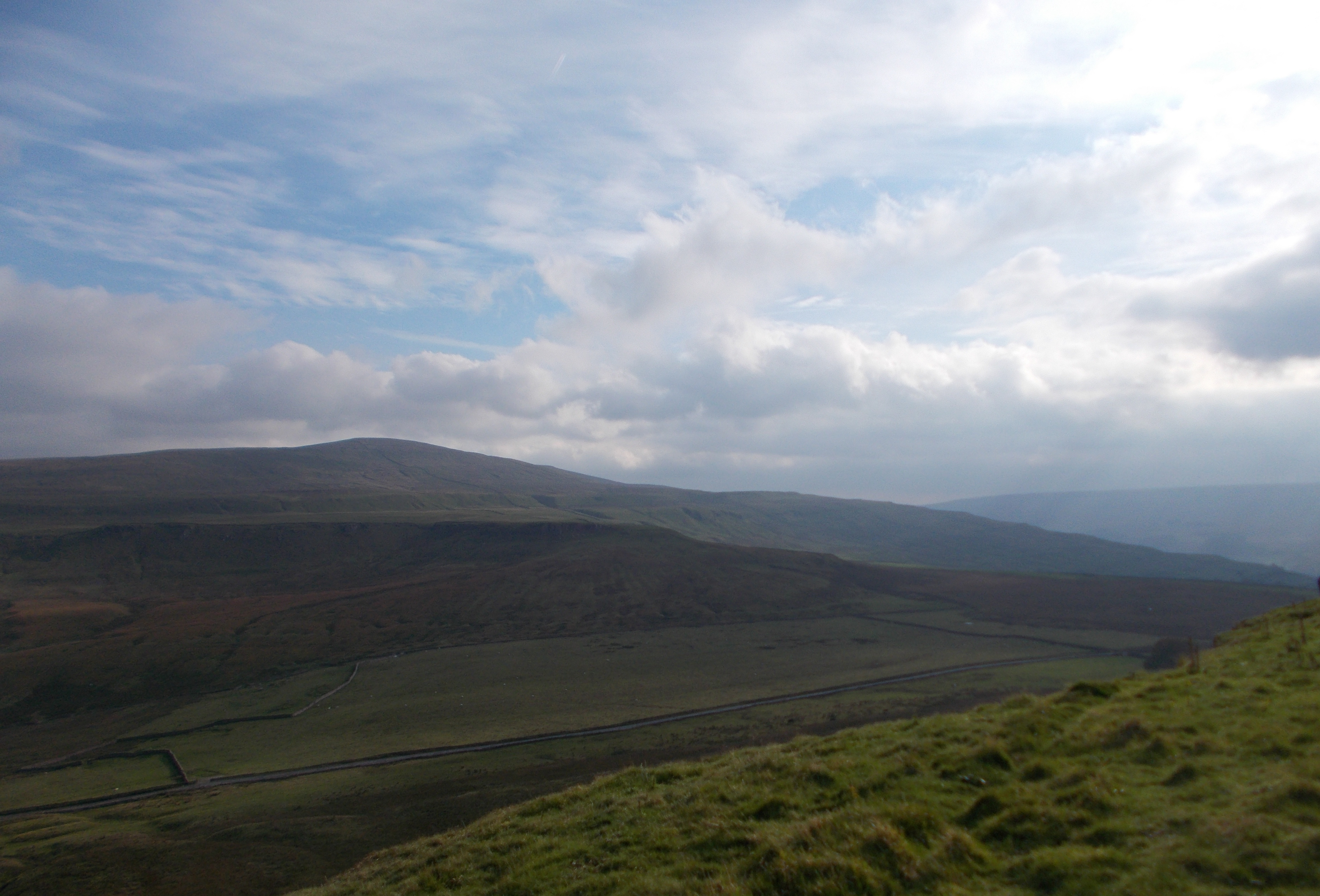
View of Buckden Pike, from the north-west on Kidstones Scar

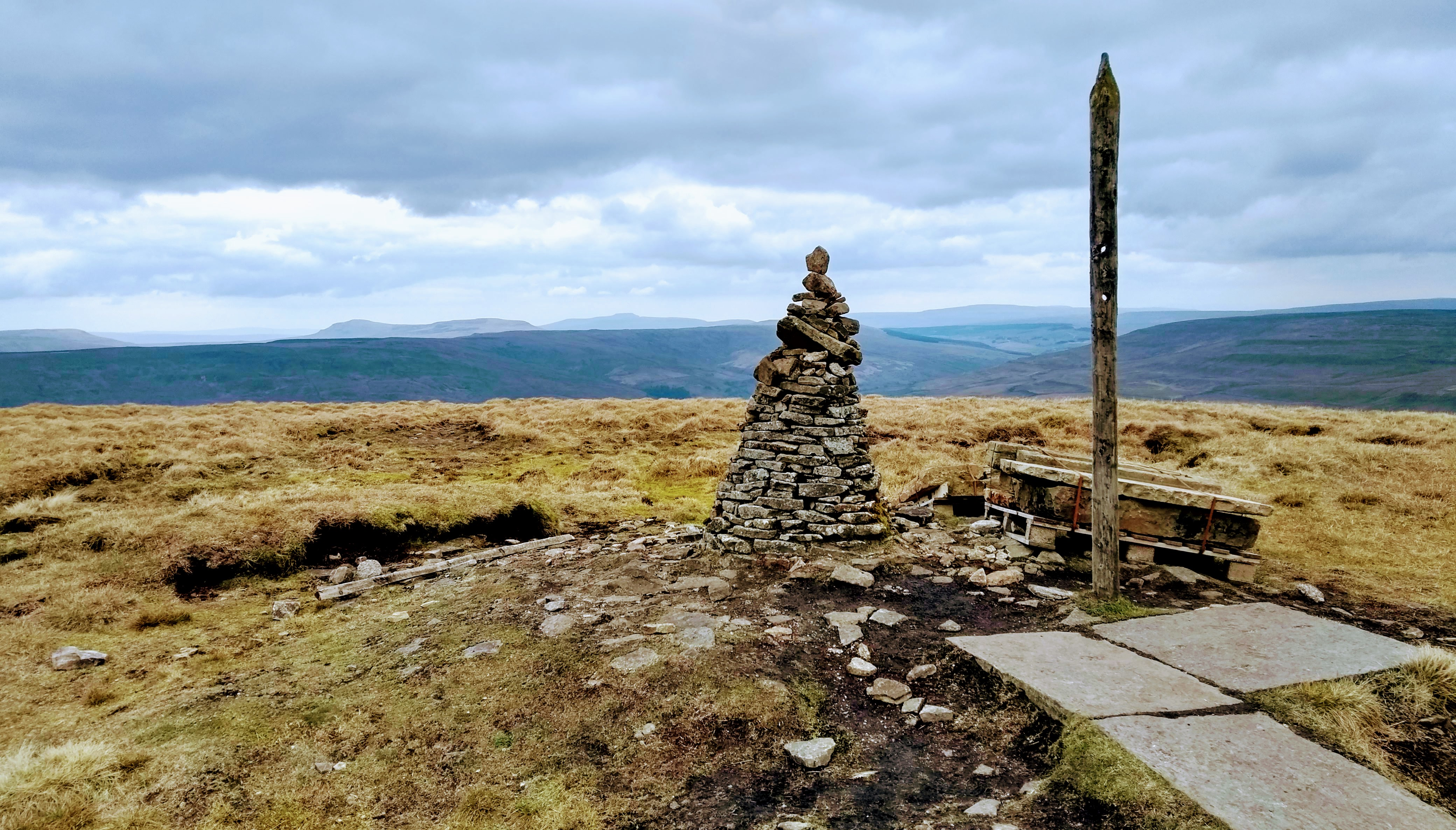
View west from Buckden Pike summit cairn, with Pen-y-ghent, Ingleborough and Whernside visible in the distance

Every year, Buckden Pike is host to the Buckden Pike Fell Race, which is held on the third Saturday in June and coincides with Buckden village gala. The race was first run in 1981 on a course designed by Peter Jebb. In 1987, Peter altered the course to make it tougher and more interesting and it has remained unchanged ever since and this was the course on which the records were set. It has now become a classic race in the fell runners calendar and this is recognised by the fact that it is regularly selected as an English championship race. The race record is held by Finlay Wild who, in 2022, completed the course in a time of 30:39. The women's record is held by Carol Greenwood who in 1993, finished with a time of 36:32.

== See also ==
- List of peaks in the Yorkshire Dales
