= Hubberholme =

Village in North Yorkshire, England

Coordinates: 54.19976°N 2.11467°W

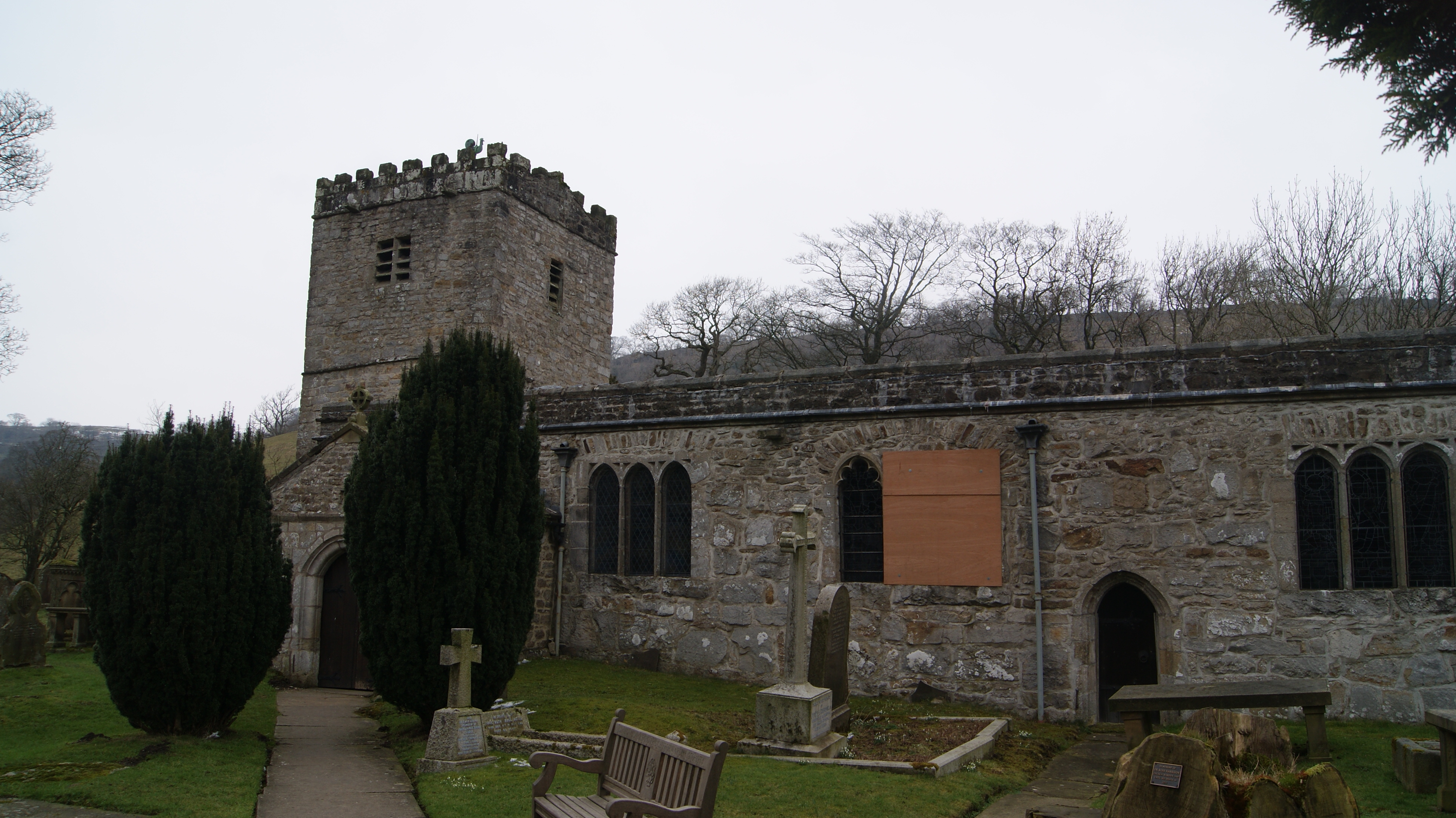
- St Michael and All Angels' Church, Hubberholme (February 2013), note the broken window

- Location within North Yorkshire
- OS grid reference: SD926782
- Civil parish: Buckden
- Unitary authority: North Yorkshire
- Ceremonial county: North Yorkshire
- Region: Yorkshire and the Humber
- Country: England
- Sovereign state: United Kingdom
- Post town: SKIPTON
- Postcode district: BD23
- Police: North Yorkshire
- Fire: North Yorkshire
- Ambulance: Yorkshire
- UK Parliament: Skipton and Ripon

Hubberholme is an old village in Upper Wharfedale in the Yorkshire Dales, North Yorkshire, England, at the point where Langstrothdale meets Wharfedale. It is quite secluded and the nearest village is Buckden.

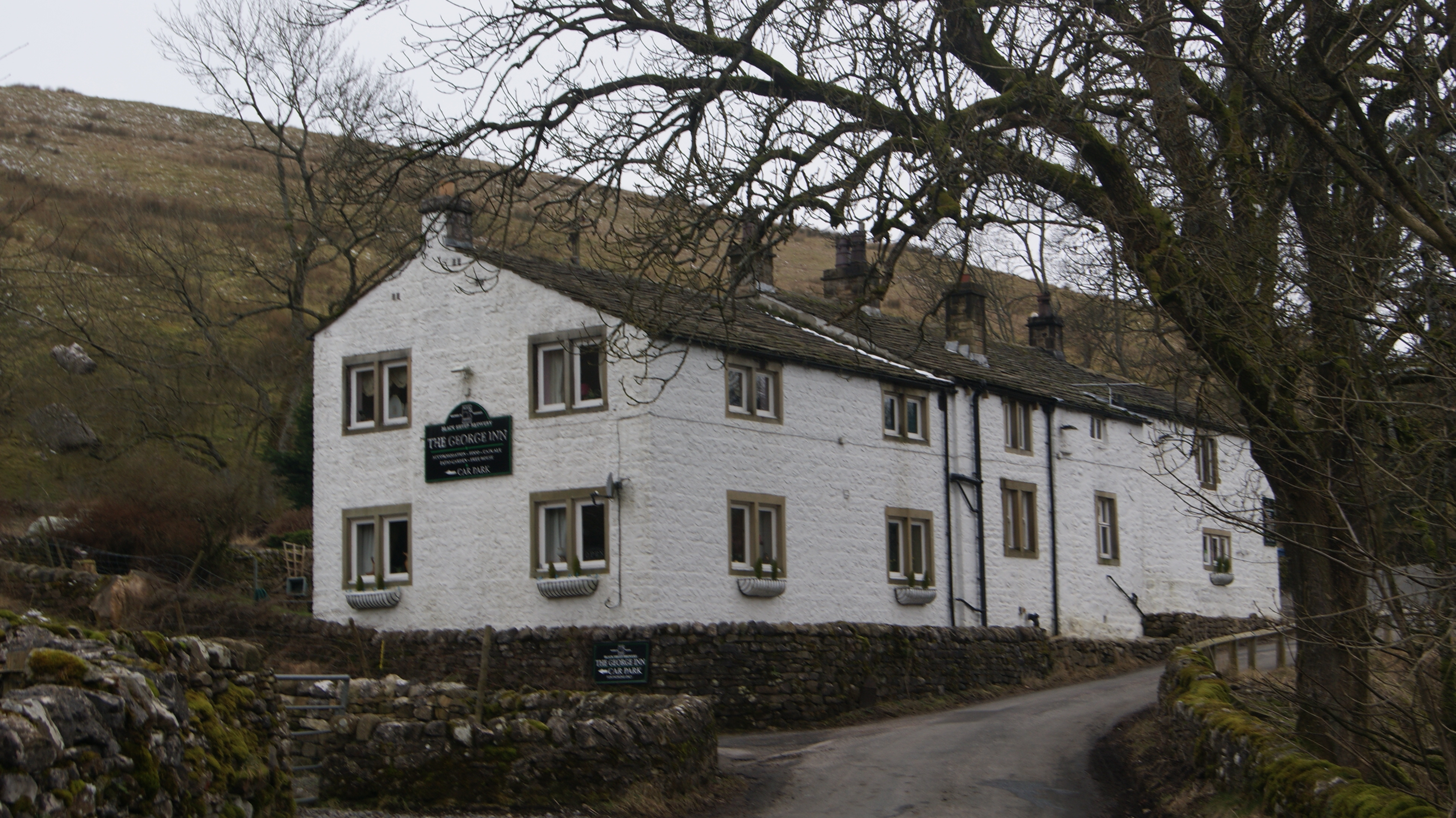
The George Inn at Hubberholme

The village was a favourite place of writer and playwright J.B. Priestley who described it as the smallest, pleasantest place in the world. The churchyard of St Michael and All Angels' Church is the resting place of his ashes. The old inn, The George, is opposite the Church. This is notable for the lit candle that sits on the bar to indicate the pub is open and serving. The tradition dates from distinctive auctions for agricultural land or grazing that are still held in The George. The last bid to be received before the candle extinguished is the winner.

The George Pub in Hubberholme opens throughout the year (with the White Lion at Cray and the Buck Inn at Buckden the closest alternative watering holes). After the George Inn, there is no pub on the Dales Way until the Sportsman Inn at Cowgill in Cumbria. The church holds regular Sunday services, normally at 11.00 am.

== Buildings ==
There are two architecturally notable buildings in Hubberholme, St Michael and All Angels' Church and Scar House.

=== St. Michael and All Angels' Church ===
This small Norman church is open for regular services. There is a small cemetery in its grounds which contain the ashes of J.B. Priestley. Most of the church dates from the 12th century but the oak roof was completed in 1558. The church's oak pews were crafted by Kilburn's Robert Thompson, whose trademark mouse can be found in the woodwork. The tower contains two bells, both cast by John Taylor and Co of Loughborough in the early 20th century. They replaced an older bell, cast by William Oldfield in 1601, which is now on display in the church. The heavier bell can be rung full-circle. The George Inn, opposite the church, was originally the vicarage.

The church was featured in the final episode of the BBC television series All Creatures Great and Small as the venue for the wedding of Franco and Katharine Pedretti.

=== Scar House ===
Scar House is on the hill overlooking Hubberholme and is often passed by ramblers on their way to Cray. The current building is of Victorian origin but a previous house was visited by George Fox in 1652 while he was trying to convert Seekers to Quakers. At the time the house was owned by James Tennant, who was later executed in York for religious reasons. The house became the first piece of land owned by the Quakers and contains a Quaker burial ground, although there are no headstones.

== Rambling ==
Hubberholme is the midpoint of a very popular walk from Buckden via Hubberholme to Cray (lunch at the White Lion) and along the lower slopes of Buckden Pike back to Buckden – about 6 miles (9.7 km). Hubberholme also lies on the Dales Way in between Buckden and Yockenthwaite.

== Transport ==
Hubberholme lies on a narrow unclassified road connecting Buckden and Hawes. The road is often impassable in heavy snow.

There is no public transport in Hubberholme but Dales Bus operate a service to Kettlewell, Grassington and Ilkley from nearby Buckden. The cities of Leeds and Bradford can be reached by train from Ilkley railway station.

== See also ==
- Listed buildings in Buckden, North Yorkshire
