= Listed buildings in Buckden, North Yorkshire =

Buckden is a civil parish in the county of North Yorkshire, England. It contains 23 listed buildings that are recorded in the National Heritage List for England. Of these, one is listed at Grade II*, the middle of the three grades, and the others are at Grade II, the lowest grade. The parish contains the village of Buckden, and the smaller settlements of Hubberholme, Yockenthwaite, Deepdale and Oughtershaw, extending up the valley of the River Wharfe. Most of the listed buildings are houses and associated structures, farmhouses and farm buildings. The others consist of a church, a sundial in the churchyard, two public houses, a former school and chapel, a former coach house and stables, and three bridges over the river.

== Key ==
Grade	Criteria
II*	Particularly important buildings of more than special interest
II	Buildings of national importance and special interest

== Buildings ==
Name and location	Photograph	Date	Notes	Grade
Church of St Michael and All Angels, Hubberholme; 54.20013°N 2.11468°W		12th century	The church has been altered and extended through the centuries, including a restoration in 1863 by Ewan Christian. It is built in limestone with a lead-coated steel roof, and consists of a nave and a chancel under one roof, north and south aisles, a south porch, a north vestry, a west tower, and a boiler house between the tower and the north aisle. The tower has two stages, slit windows, bell openings with one and two lights, and an embattled parapet. The porch is gabled and has an outer doorway with a moulded segmental arch, and a datestone in the gable, and a round-arched inner doorway. Inside, there is a painted rood screen and loft dated 1558.	II*
Church Farmhouse; 54.20025°N 2.11327°W	—	17th century	The farmhouse is in whitewashed limestone and has a stone slate roof. There are two storeys and four bays. The openings have plain surrounds, most of the windows are sashes, and there is a re-set three-light mullioned window.	II
Dane Hill; 54.22927°N 2.20233°W	—	17th century	The house, which has been altered, is in gritstone with a stone slate roof. There are two storeys, three bays, and an outshut to the right. On the front is a porch, and most of the windows are mullioned. At the rear are two rows of projecting through-stones.	II
Mullions; 54.18937°N 2.08889°W	—	17th century	A house in limestone, with a stone slate roof, two storeys and four bays. The doorway has a moulded quoined surround, the moulding arched over an illegible date. The windows are recessed and chamfered, some with mullions.	II
Sundial; 54.20000°N 2.11463°W		17th century (probable)	The sundial is in the churchyard of the Church of St Michael and All Angels, Hubberholme to the south of the chancel. It is in gritstone, and about 1.2 metres (3 ft 11 in) high. The sundial has a circular base on a plinth, and an octagonal shaft of three blocks, the upper block splayed and with a band. The top slab has incised lines and Roman numerals, and the gnomon has an inscription and a date.	II
The Cottage and outbuilding 54.21324°N 2.16401°W		17th century	The house and attached byre are in limestone, with quoins and a stone slate roof. There are two storeys and five bays. The doorway has chamfered quoined jambs, the byre door is to the left, and the windows are recessed, chamfered and mullioned.	II
Ivy Cottage; 54.19105°N 2.08955°W	—	1655	A house, to which a porch was added in 1705, in limestone, with quoins and a stone slate roof. There are two storeys and four bays, with a two-storey porch projecting from the third bay. The doorway is in the right return, and has quoined moulded chamfered jambs, a pulvinated frieze and a moulded segmental pediment. The windows are recessed and chamfered, some are mullioned, and the others are sashes.	II
West Deepdale; 54.21343°N 2.16529°W	—	1679	A limestone house with quoins and a grey slate roof. There are two storeys, four bays, an added bay to the right, and a rear outshut. The doorway has chamfered quoined jambs and a cambered head, above which are three panels with initials and the date. In the ground floor is a three-light recessed chamfered mullioned window, a transomed window, and two 20th-century windows, and the upper floor contains sash windows in recessed chamfered surrounds.	II
Manor House; 54.19118°N 2.09183°W	—	1691	The house is in limestone, with quoins, and a stone slate roof with gable copings and shaped kneelers. There are two storeys and two bays. In the centre is a doorway with a chamfered surround, over which is an arched plaque with an initial and a date, and a flat stone hood on brackets. The windows are recessed, chamfered and mullioned, those in the ground floor with hood moulds. At the rear is a blocked doorway with a dated and initialled lintel, and a mullioned and transomed stair window.	II
East Deepdale; 54.21344°N 2.16407°W		1693	The house is in limestone with quoins and a roof of stone slate with blue slate on the porch. There are two storeys, three bays and a rear wing. In the centre is a two-storey gabled porch containing a doorway with an elaborately moulded lintel and jambs. The lintel is inscribed with initials and the date, and above it is a hood mould and a sash window. On the left return is a round-headed window with a chamfered surround, the right return contains a rectangular window, and in the outer bays are sash windows.	II
Scar House; 54.20557°N 2.12196°W		1697	The house, which probably contains earlier material, is in limestone with quoins, stone gutter brackets, and a stone slate roof with gable copings and shaped kneelers. There are two storeys and three bays. The doorway has a rusticated surround, a pulvinated frieze and a moulded cornice, over which is a round-arched plaque containing initials, a date and a flower motif, and another plaque inscribed "REBUILT". The windows are mullioned, and at the rear is a large rectangular stair window. In the left return is a doorway with a chamfered quoined surround and a cambered head.	II
Cowside House and outbuilding 54.21550°N 2.17882°W		1707	The house is in limestone on a plinth, with quoins and a stone slate roof. There are two storeys, the house has two bays, to the left is a two-bay outbuilding, and at the rear is a two-bay range. The central doorway has a chamfered surround, and the windows are recessed, chamfered and mullioned. Above the ground floor windows are hood moulds, and over the doorway is a re-set datestone. The outbuilding contains an arched doorway with a chamfered surround and a keystone, and to its left is a door with quoined jambs.	II
Buckden Bridge; 54.19149°N 2.09370°W		1709 (probable)	The bridge, which was rebuilt in the 19h century, carries Dubb's Lane over the River Wharfe. It is in limestone, and consists of a wide central segmental arch, with a smaller arch on each side. The bridge has pointed cutwaters rising to pedestrian refuges, quoins, voussoirs, and parapets with rounded coping.	II
Willbrow Cottage and barn 54.20656°N 2.14639°W	—	Early 18th century (probable)	The house and barn are in limestone and have a stone slate roof. There are two storeys, the house has three bays and a rear outshut, and the barn is to the left. The doorway has quoined jambs, and a re-set dated and initialled triangular lintel, above which is a flat stone hood on brackets. In the barn is a cart entrance and a doorway.	II
Yockenthwaite Bridge; 54.20702°N 2.14789°W		Early 18th century (probable)	The bridge, which carries a road over the River Wharfe, is in gritstone, and consists of a single high segmental arch. It has voussoirs, and rounded parapet coping.	II
The George Inn; 54.19944°N 2.11452°W		Early to mid 18th century	A vicarage, later a public house, in painted limestone with a stone slate roof. There are two storeys and five bays. The main doorway has long and short quoined jambs, and to the left is a plained doorway. The windows have flat-faced mullions.	II
Yockenthwaite Hall, outbuilding, wall and gate 54.20720°N 2.14645°W	—	Mid to late 18th century	The house is in gritstone, with quoins, a moulded eaves cornice, and a stone slate roof with gable copings. There are two storeys and four bays, and a lower two-bay outbuilding on the left. The doorway has an eared architrave, a pulvinated frieze and a modillion pediment, and the windows are casements. The outbuilding contains a doorway with a shouldered surround and inserted garage doors. In front is a gritstone garden wall with flat coping, and a wrought iron gate.	II
Buckden House; 54.18967°N 2.08947°W		Late 18th century	The house was extended in the 19th century, and later used for other purposes. It is in gritstone, with quoins, a floor band, an eaves band, stone gutter brackets, and a stone slate roof. There are three storeys and five bays, and on the front is a projecting single-storey entrance range. The original doorway in the entrance range has an eared and moulded architrave, a pulvinated frieze, a modillion cornice, and a triangular pediment. The later doorway has columns, an entablature and a cornice. The windows are mullioned, most with three lights, and contain sashes. At the rear is a round-arched transomed window with imposts and a keystone.	II
Outbuilding southwest of The George Inn; 54.19938°N 2.11481°W	—	Early 19th century (probable)	A coach house and stables, later used for other purposes, in limestone with a stone slate roof. In the centre is a two-storey bay with a pyramidal roof and the stump of a ball finial, flanked by single storey bays with lofts. The central doorway has a four-centred arch with voussoirs, and a dated keystone, above which is a circular pitching hole flanked by slit vents. The outer bays contain doorways and windows.	II
Top Farmhouse; 54.20775°N 2.14614°W		Early 19th century	The farmhouse is in gritstone with quoins and a stone slate roof. There are two storeys and three bays, and a lower bay to the left. The central doorway has a plain surround and a fanlight.	II
The Buck Inn; 54.19049°N 2.08993°W		Early to mid 19th century	The public house is in gritstone, with long and short chamfered quoins and a grey slate roof. There are two storeys and three bays. The central doorway has a plain surround and a cornice on console brackets, and the windows are sashes.	II
Former school and chapel 54.22893°N 2.20008°W		1856	A school and chapel, probably designed by John Ruskin, later converted into a private house. It is in limestone and gritstone, with moulded stone gutters on plain brackets, and coped gables with shaped kneelers and cross finials. There is a single storey and three bays. The entrance in the east end has a massive round arch of two orders with imposts and a hood mould, and a doorway with a shouldered arch and decorated hinges. The arch is flanked by columns, and has chamfered voussoirs in contrasting colours, and a tympanum containing an inscription, a symbol and the date. On the south front are three round-headed windows with colonnettes, and to the right is a bellcote with a corbelled cover. In the east wall is a three light window, and the east and west walls contain marble plaques.	II
Hubberholme Bridge; 54.19963°N 2.11468°W		Mid to late 19th century	The bridge carries Stubbing Lane over the River Wharfe. It is in gritstone, and consists of a single arch. The bridge has radiating voussoirs, a band, and a parapet with projecting coping. The parapets end in domed bollards.	II
