= Deepdale, North Yorkshire =

Hamlet in North Yorkshire, England

Coordinates: 54.2125°N 2.1617°W

Deepdale
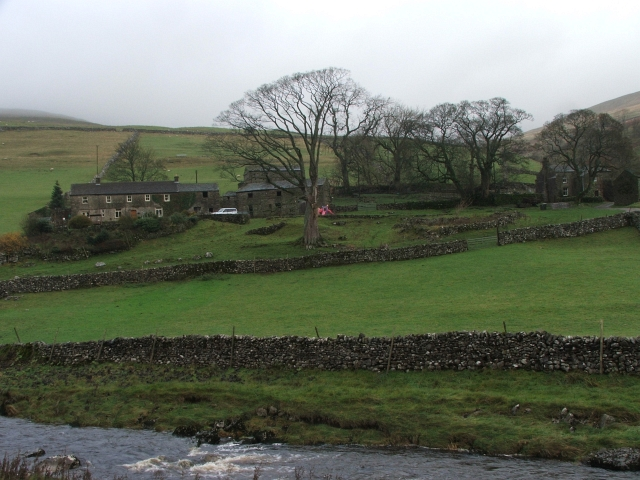
- Farm buildings in Deepdale

- Location within North Yorkshire
- OS grid reference: SD895796
- Civil parish: Buckden
- Unitary authority: North Yorkshire
- Ceremonial county: North Yorkshire
- Region: Yorkshire and the Humber
- Country: England
- Sovereign state: United Kingdom
- Post town: SKIPTON
- Postcode district: BD23
- Dialling code: 01756
- Police: North Yorkshire
- Fire: North Yorkshire
- Ambulance: Yorkshire

Deepdale is a hamlet in Langstrothdale in the Yorkshire Dales in the north of England. The hamlet is 6.5 miles (10.5 km) northwest of Kettlewell and 15 miles (24 km) north of Settle. The hamlet was originally in the wapentake of Staincliffe and has been written as Deep Dale, Deep-Dale and Deepdale.

Deepdale lies on the north bank of the River Wharfe, on the route of the Dales Way. To the west of the hamlet lies Deepdale Meadows SSSI, a selection of hayfields with rare grasses. The fields are indicative of what lowland Yorkshire Dales fields would have looked like before intensive farming methods changed the landscape.

== See also ==
- Listed buildings in Buckden, North Yorkshire
