= Langstrothdale =

Valley in North Yorkshire, England

Coordinates: 54.204°N 2.134°W

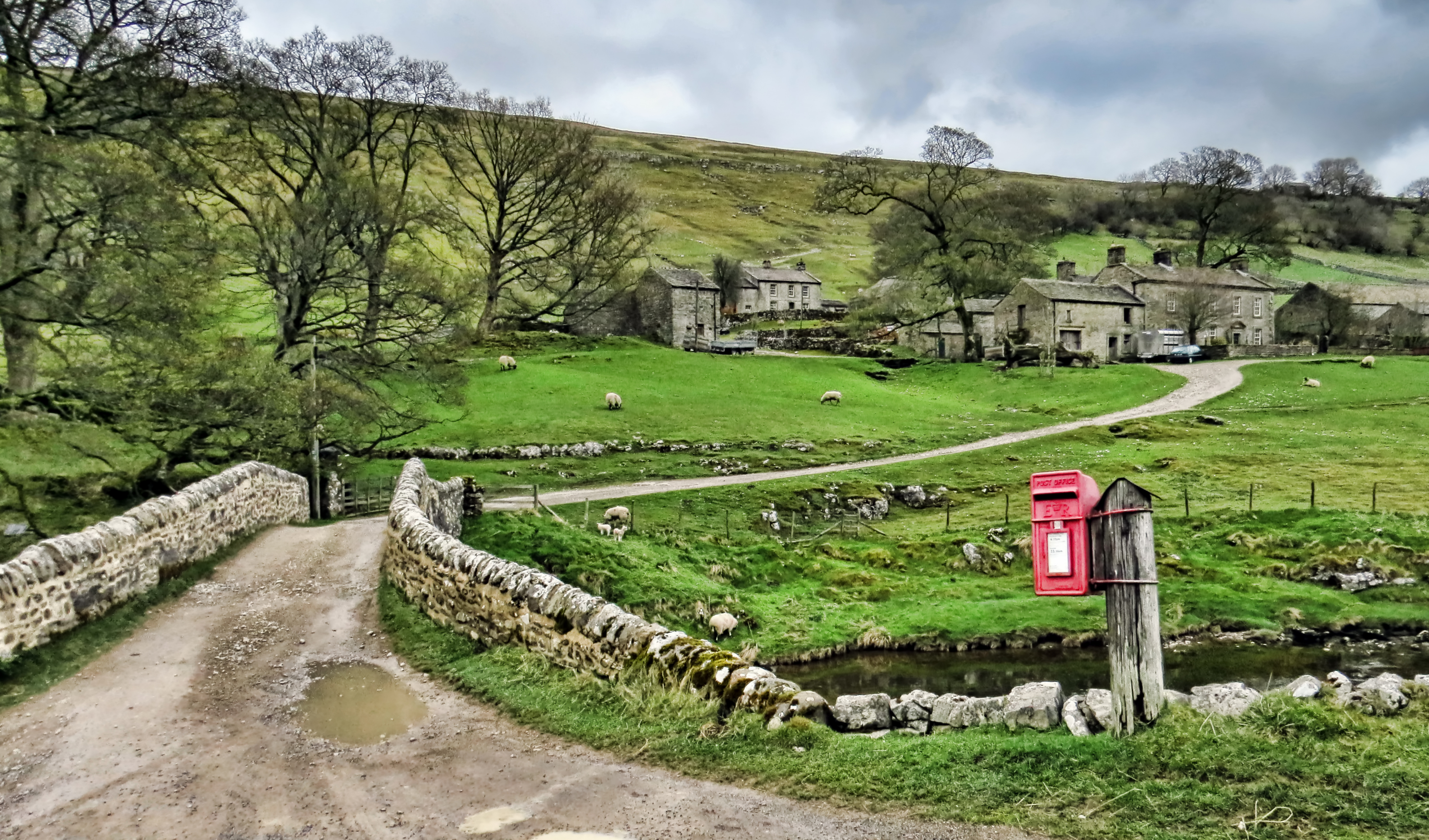
Yockenthwaite – A Yorkshire Dales hamlet in Langstrothdale

Langstrothdale is a scenic valley in the Yorkshire Dales in North Yorkshire, England. The uppermost course of the River Wharfe runs through it, but Wharfedale does not begin until the Wharfe meets Cray Gill, downstream of Hubberholme. The name Langstrothdale derives from Old English and translates as 'long marsh' or 'marshy ground'.

The dale was first colonised by Anglians in the seventh century, with Norse invaders arriving later. In Norman times, many of the isolated settlements were allowed to remain, but were prevented from expanding by an arcane ruling known as the 'Forest Law'. At that time, Langstrothdale was well forested, and the upper northern part of the dale (which is now moorland) was a royal hunting forest known as Langstrothdale Chase or as the 'Forest of Langstroth'.

The dale became part of the lands owned by the Clifford family and in 1604, due to the then Earl of Cumberland's 'extravagances', the lands were sold to pay off his debts. This allowed many Dalesfolk to purchase their own farmsteads.

In the age before mass transportation, the road through the dale was part of a packhorse route from Lancaster to Newcastle upon Tyne. Previous to this, it had been a monastic route that came over from Ribblesdale into Langstrothdale. The current road westwards through the dale is not a through route to vehicles, ceasing to be a metalled road at High Greenfield (SD830792). The other branch of the road through the dale turns northwards at Beckermonds, to go through Oughtershaw and over Fleet Moss into Sleddale. The long-distance paths, a Pennine Journey, and the Dales Way both traverse the dale.

The largest conifer forest in the Yorkshire Dales National Park, Greenfield Plantation, was created in upper Langstrothdale between 1968 and 1979. The forest (including a second adjoining plantation known as Cam), covers an area of 3,000 acres (1,200 hectares), and was made publicly accessible with 7.5 miles (12 km) of bridleways in 2022. Greenfield Plantation was designated as a red squirrel reserve in 2007, and a culling programme for grey squirrels has seen them all but eradicated from the upper dale.

== Settlements ==
- Hubberholme
- Yockenthwaite
- Deepdale
- Beckermonds
- Oughtershaw
