= Otley Bridge =

Bridge across the River Wharfe in West Yorkshire, England

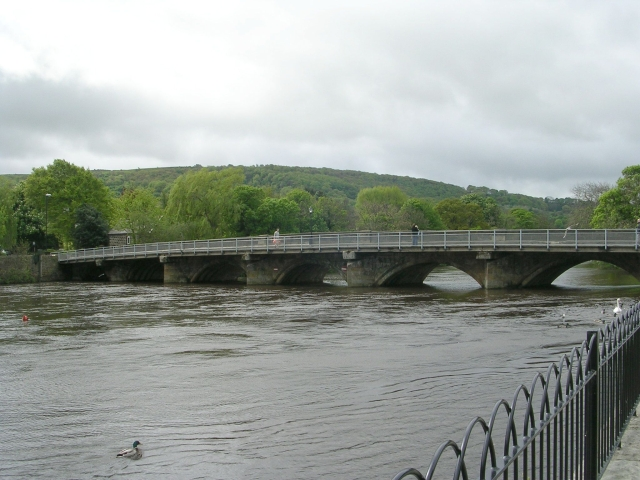
- Otley Bridge (2009)
- Coordinates: 53.9085°N 1.6951°W
- Carries: Road and Pedestrian traffic
- Crosses: River Wharfe
- Locale: Otley, West Yorkshire
- Owner: Leeds City Council

Characteristics
- Design: Stone arch bridge

History
- Construction start: 1228
- Construction end: 1229

Statistics

Scheduled monument
- Official name: Otley Bridge
- Reference no.: 1005800

Location
- Interactive map of Otley Bridge

Otley Bridge is a seven arch stone bridge that crosses the River Wharfe in Otley, England. The original bridge was completed in 1229 and has been repaired and upgraded multiple times over the years. The original structure was commissioned by the Archbishop of York in 1228 and is now a scheduled monument. In its present form the bridge carries B6451 (Bridge Street) over the River Wharfe, with two-way road traffic and a pedestrian walkway.

== History ==
In the 13th century, the site in Otley was already established as a crossing place of the River Wharfe due to shallow crossing points or fords. Upon founding the town, the then Archbishop of York Walter de Gray began taking action to expand the settlement. This included the creation of burgage plots for merchants and a market. This as well as the presence of the Archbishop's Palace at the Manor House warranted the creation of a formal river crossing at Otley, to create a more direct route to York.

=== Original construction and early repairs ===
Otley Bridge, commissioned by the Archbishop of York, was originally constructed as a five arch stone bridge, made from local masonry. The width of the bridge was designed to allow the width of a cart. The areas upstream and downstream have been subject to significant flooding historically, with the earliest record in the region being 1406 and records of damage to the bridge in 1673. The bridge was repaired in later years as it was crucial for mobility in the area.

=== 18th Century reconstruction and expansion ===
To accommodate increasing traffic and improve the condition of Otley Bridge, John Gott, Civil Engineer and Surveyor was commissioned to conduct rebuilding and widening works. During this redevelopment (1775-76), two further arches were added to the original five arch span and the western section was widened to increase traffic flow.

=== 20th century footbridge ===
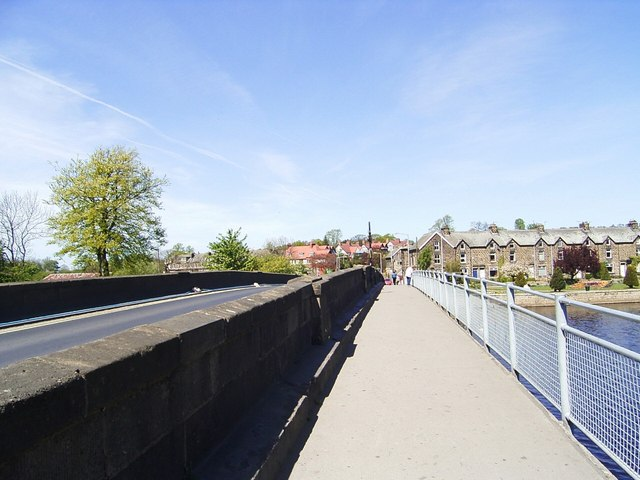
Modern footbridge attached to the historic Otley Bridge.

To enable both road vehicles and pedestrians to safely use the bridge it became necessary to add an adjoining footbridge to the structure of Otley Bridge. In 1926, a separate concrete footbridge on the eastern side of the bridge was proposed; however, this was rejected due to the Ancient Monument Status of Otley Bridge. A local architect and later the Local Authority proposed bridge widening schemes in the late 1920s and early 30s, which came to nothing. In 1937 it was proposed that the whole bridge be demolished and replaced with a modern single span structure, however this was again rejected for historic preservation reasons. Following World War Two, funds were granted to install other traffic calming measures including traffic signals. A further scheme in 1952 for a footbridge was not constructed due to high costs.

Finally in 1957, a cantilevered footpath was added to Otley Bridge for the sum of £6,200 at the time. However, this solution was later described as 'ghastly' by English Heritage.

=== Modern proposals ===
In 2006, Leeds City Council, the owner of Otley Bridge, commissioned a new proposal. The report proposed the removal of the 50s footbridge, refurbishment of the bridge and further widening to allow for two pedestrian footpaths. These plans were widely rejected due to costs and a lack of public support.

== Footbridge Replacement ==
In 2023, Leeds City Council identified defects to the bridge prompting action to replace the footbridge. While works are conducted a temporary footbridge will be installed further along the river. The temporary footbridge is planned to be in operation in spring 2025 and the new Otley footbridge will be opened by autumn 2025.

== Roosting bats ==
Daubenton's bats roost in the arches of Otley Bridge in the summer months. The visiting colony uses the river environment as a food source.
