= Common stonechat =

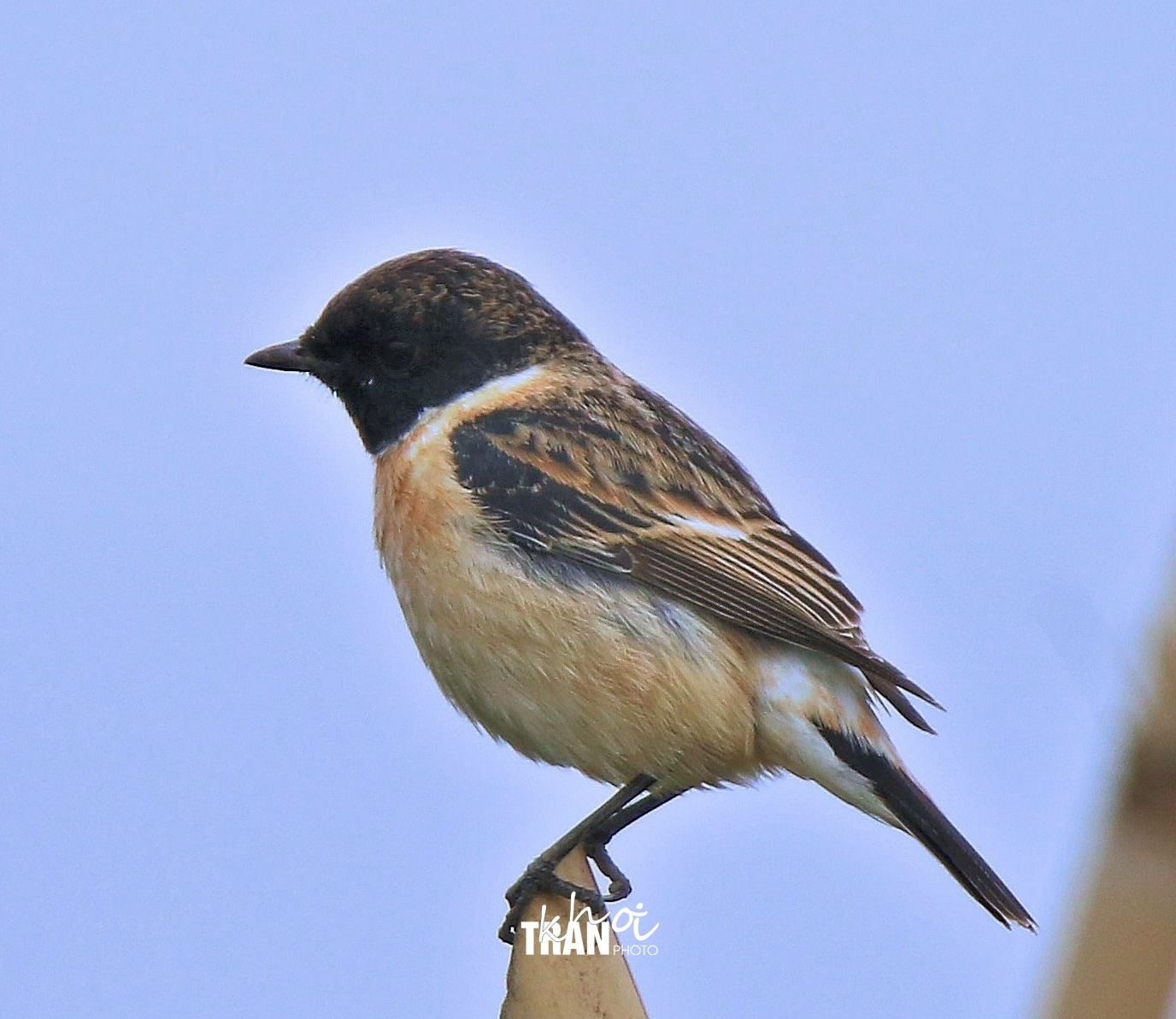
Common Stonechat

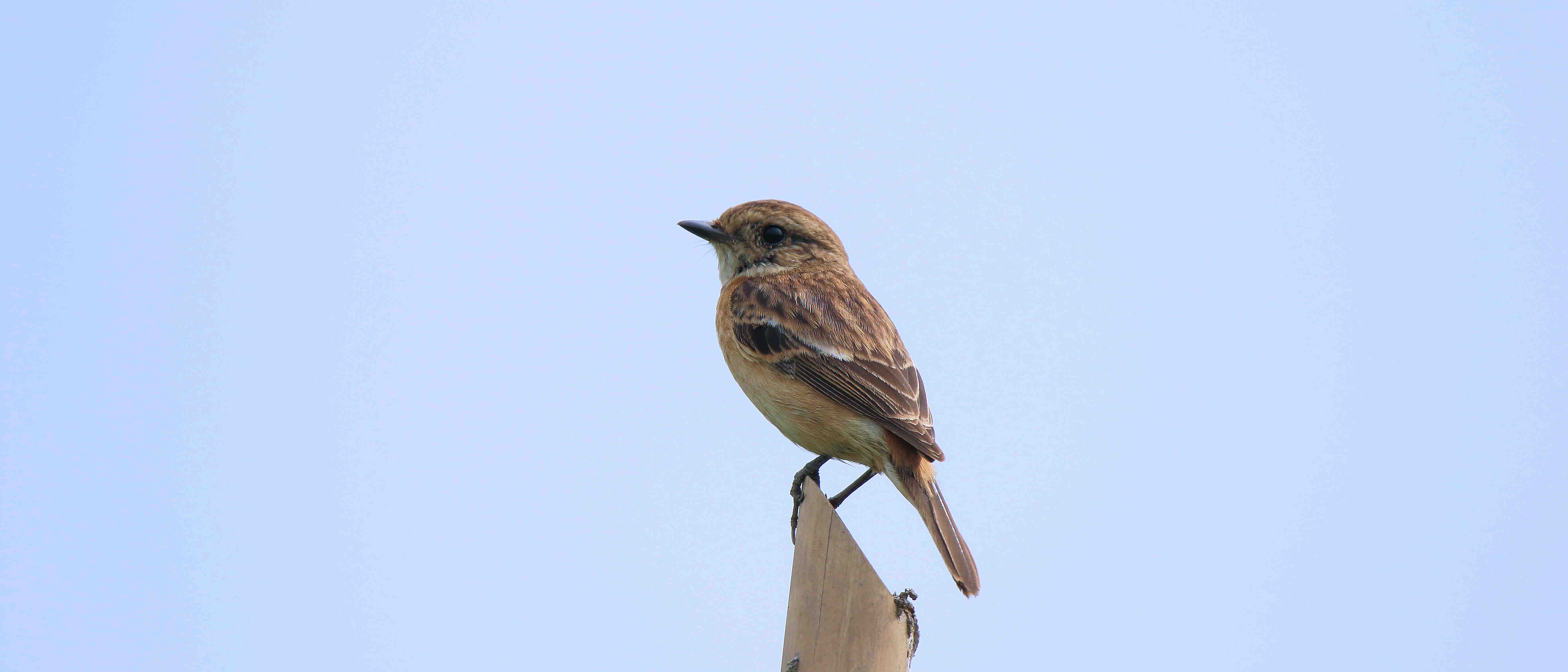
Female Common Stonechat

Distribution map of Common Stonechat in broad sense Saxicola torquatus sensu lato

Common stonechat is the name used for the Saxicola species Saxicola torquatus when this is treated in its broad sense.

It is, however, now more widely considered to be a superspecies consisting of several related but distinct species, which are outwardly fairly similar but genetically distinct and replacing each other geographically without significant hybridisation:

- African stonechat Saxicola torquatus in the strict sense
- European stonechat Saxicola rubicola
- Siberian stonechat Saxicola maurus
- Amur stonechat Saxicola stejnegeri
- Madagascar stonechat Saxicola sibilla

Three other species, not previously included within the broad view of common stonechat, have also been shown to be members of the superspecies:

- Fuerteventura chat Saxicola dacotiae
- Reunion stonechat Saxicola tectes
- White-tailed stonechat Saxicola leucurus

Species status possible, but not yet verified:

- Ethiopian stonechat Saxicola (torquatus) albofasciatus

Not all of the above are currently recognised as full species by all of the relevant taxonomical authorities, for example the British Ornithologists' Union, currently include stejnegeri as a subspecies of Saxicola maurus.
