= Dales Way =

79-mile footpath in Northern England

Coordinates: 53.9289°N 1.8324°W

- Waymark and logo
- Length: 78.5 miles (126.3 km)
- Location: Northern England
- Established: April 1969; 57 years ago
- Trailheads: Ilkley; Bowness-on-Windermere
- Use: Hiking
- Elevation gain/loss: 7,880 ft (2,402 m)
- Highest point: Cam High Road, 1,705 ft (520 m)
- Maintainer: Dales Way Association
- Website: www.dalesway.org
Trail map

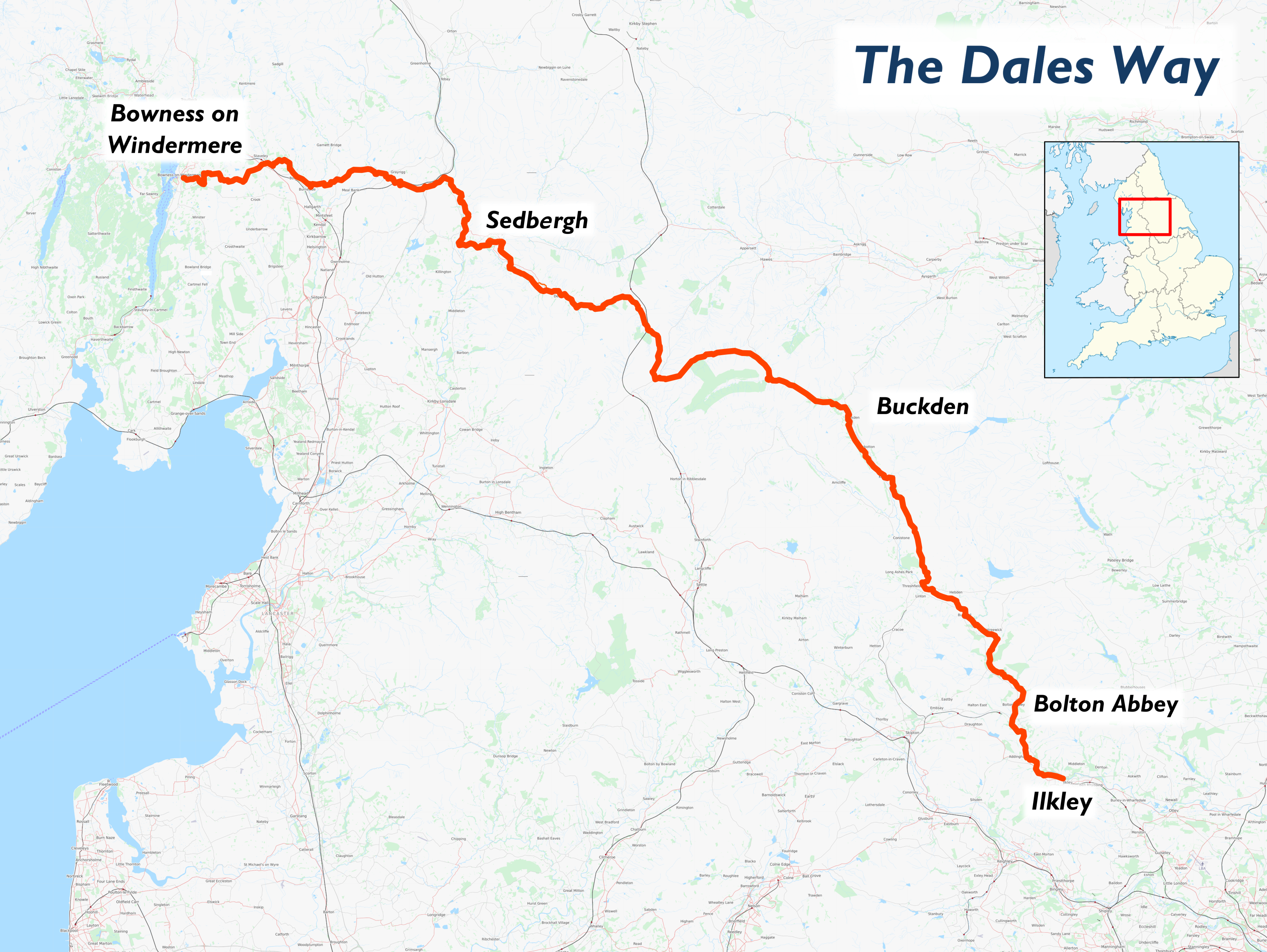
Route map

The Dales Way is an 78.5-mile (126.3 km) long-distance footpath in Northern England, from (south-east to north-west) Ilkley, West Yorkshire, to Bowness-on-Windermere, Cumbria. This walk was initially devised by the West Riding Ramblers' Association with the 'leading lights' being Colin Speakman and Tom Wilcock (Footpath Secretary). The route was announced to the public in 1968 and the first recorded crossing was by a group of Bradford Grammar School Venture Scouts in 1969.

The Dales Way passes through two National Parks: the Yorkshire Dales National Park and the Lake District National Park. The first half of the walk follows the River Wharfe upstream to the main watershed of Northern England at Ribblehead. The second half follows several river valleys (Dentdale, River Mint, River Kent) to descend to the shores of Windermere.

== Route ==
The walk, which mostly follows river valleys, is shorter and less difficult than better-known routes such as the Pennine Way and Coast to Coast Walk, and therefore makes a good training ground for these harder walks. It is feasible to complete the route in around four days, but most walkers take about a week, dividing the route into sections of 10 to 15 miles per day and taking a rest a day or two.

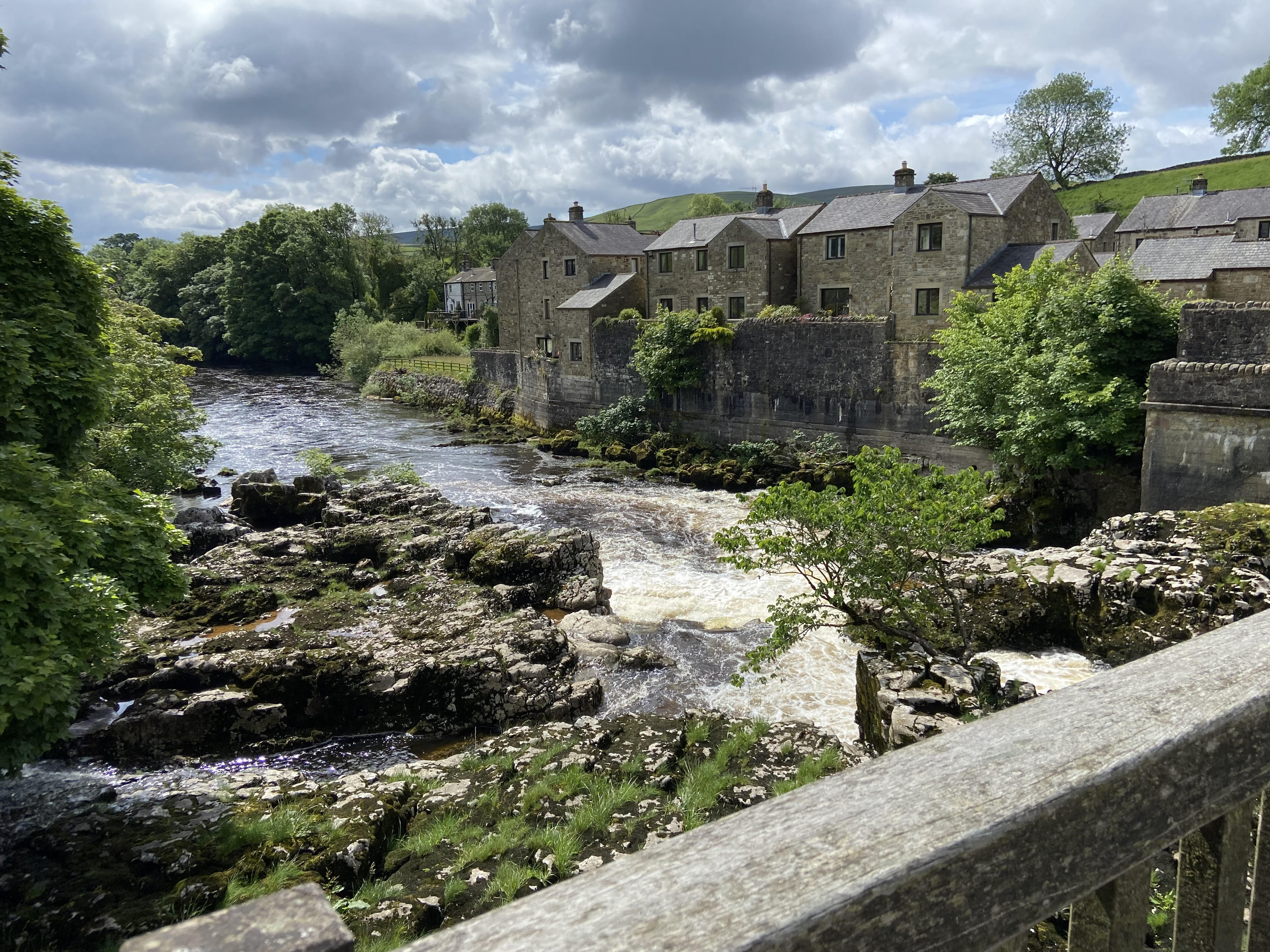
Linton Falls on the Dales Way

From Ilkley the trail closely follows the River Wharfe past Addingham, Bolton Abbey and Burnsall to Grassington. It then follows a higher level route before returning to the riverside from Kettlewell to Buckden. From there the Dales Way follows the upper reaches of the river through Langstrothdale, passing the small hamlets of Hubberholme and Yockenthwaite to Beckermonds, where the confluence of two becks forms the Wharfe. The trail ascends the valley of Oughtershaw Beck by a minor road to the hamlet of Oughtershaw.

From Oughtershaw the Dales Way ascends steeply to the watershed at Cam Fell above Cam Houses. The Dales Way descends from Cam Fell by a good track to Gearstones on the B6255 road, 1.5 miles (2.4 km) east of Ribblehead, where there is a pub and a railway station. From Cam Fell a shorter alternative route, with no facilities, follows the Pennine Bridleway to rejoin the Dales Way at Stoops Moss, 2 miles (3.2 km) north of Gearstones.

From Stoops Moss the trail descends steeply into Dentdale by a minor road, which it follows for 3 miles (4.8 km). An alternative high level route follows the Pennine Bridleway before descending past Dent railway station into Dentdale at Cowgill. The Dales Way passes through the village of Dent and then crosses a fell to reach the banks of the River Rawthey at Millthrop, just outside the town of Sedbergh.

From Sedbergh the trail follows the River Rawthey downstream, then follows the River Lune upstream through the Lune Gorge. The Dales Way eventually crosses the river by the historic Crook of Lune Bridge (the border of the former West Riding of Yorkshire), and shortly after finally leaves the Yorkshire Dales National Park.

The trail then follows field paths west. It crosses the M6 motorway and descends the valley of the River Mint. It continues west to cross the A6 road 2 miles (3.2 km) north of Kendal, and reaches the large village of Burneside on the River Kent. The Dales Way follows the River Kent north to Staveley. In its final section the trail crosses higher ground with views of the Lake District mountains to end at a dramatic viewpoint just above Bowness.

== Logistics ==
Planning an itinerary is generally easy. Public transport (including Windermere "steamers") is good at both ends of the route (railway stations at Ilkley and Windermere). The popularity of the walk (and the area generally) means that there are many choices of accommodation – for instance, many pubs along the route offer bed and breakfast.

Many walkers walk the Dales Way in sections, using public transport. Between Ilkley and Sedbergh the Dalesbus network serves the route at many points, and the Settle–Carlisle railway also assists the sectional walker. At the northern end of the route there are frequent trains on the Windermere branch line, and Stagecoach buses between Kendal, Windermere and Bowness.

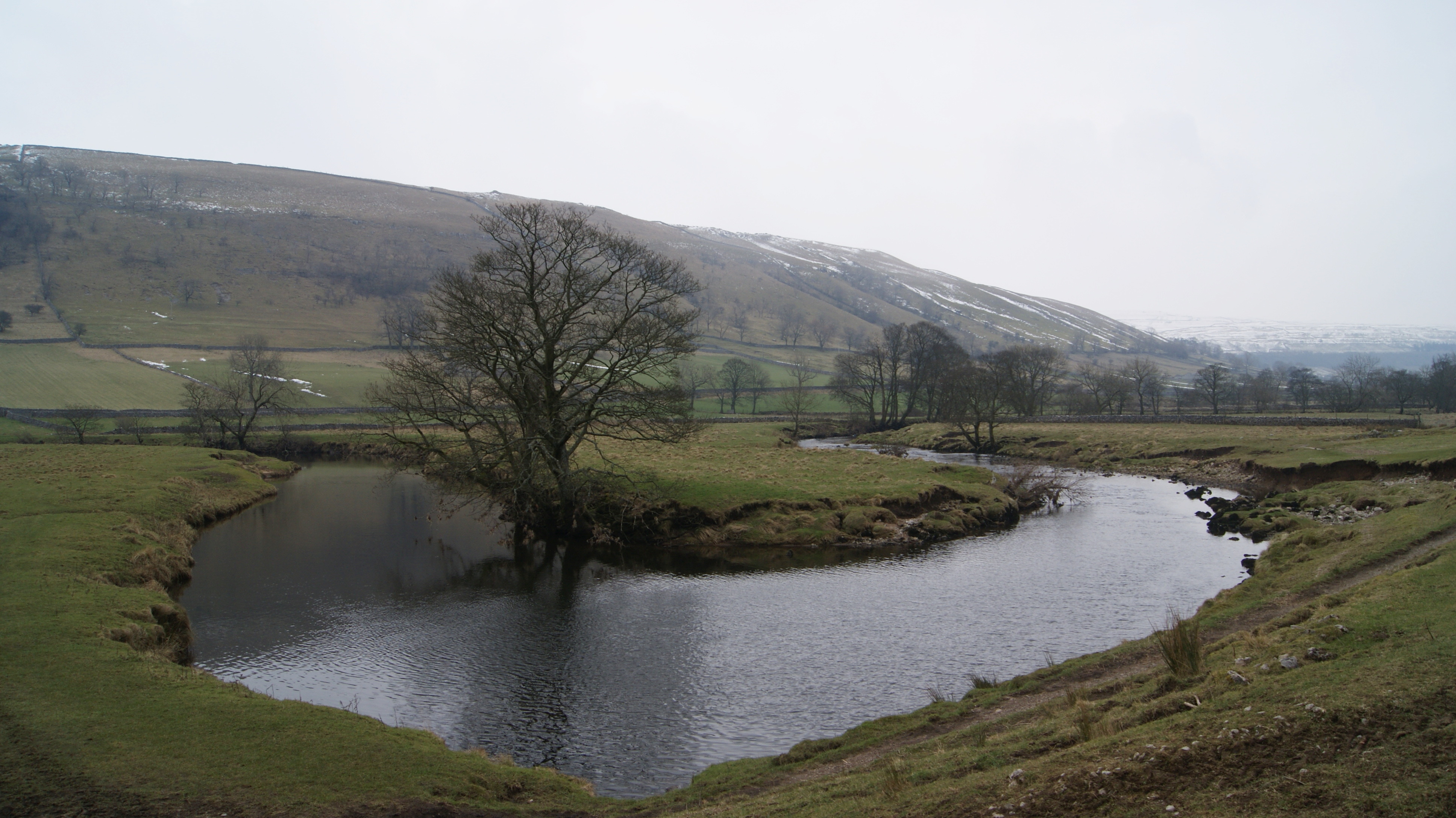
A meander on the River Wharfe between Kettlewell and Starbotton.

The largest settlements on the route are Ilkley and Bowness at either end. Grassington and Sedbergh have a range of facilities, and provisions are also available at Kettlewell, Dent, Burneside and Staveley. The larger town of Kendal is not far from the route.

=== Warnings ===
The most difficult section is over the watershed from Buckden to Gearstones. This section has the greatest ascent and descent, and passes through remote country with limited accommodation and no other facilities. The distance from Buckden to the next public transport at Ribblehead is 13.5 miles (21.7 km), and it is 16.5 miles (26.6 km) from Buckden to the first accommodation in Dentdale, near Cowgill.

For much of its length the Dales Way follows riverside paths in upland areas. Paths may become flooded and impassable and alternative routes may need to be followed. The Dales Way Association maintains up-to-date information on flooding and other hazards on its website and publishes suggested route alternatives.

== Connecting trails ==
From its initial conception the Dales Way was planned with link routes to Ilkley from three urban centres in the West Riding of Yorkshire: Leeds, Bradford and Harrogate. The Leeds Link runs for 17 miles (27 km) from Woodhouse Moor along the Meanwood Valley Trail and over Otley Chevin and Ilkley Moor to Ilkley. The Bradford Link is 12.5 miles (20.1 km) long from Bradford Cathedral via Shipley Glen and Ilkley Moor to Ilkley. The Harrogate Link is 16.5 miles (26.6 km) long, running from the Valley Gardens in Harrogate by Haverah Park and the Washburn Valley to Ilkley.

At Ilkley the Dales Way connects with the Ebor Way to York and Helmsley (where it connects with the Cleveland Way). On its course through Wharfedale, Lady Anne's Way runs in conjunction with the Dales Way. At Cam Fell between Langstrothdale and Ribblehead the Dales Way briefly coincides with the Pennine Way and the Pennine Bridleway. At Ribblehead the trail connects with the Ribble Way. Just before it reaches the end at Bowness-on-Windermere the route connects with the Windermere Way.

The Dales High Way is a high level route which runs parallel to the Dales Way between Ilkley Moor and Dent and on to Sedbergh.
