= Beckermonds =

Hamlet in North Yorkshire, England

Coordinates: 54.21838°N 2.19586°W

- Location within North Yorkshire
- OS grid reference: SD873803
- Civil parish: Buckden
- Unitary authority: North Yorkshire
- Ceremonial county: North Yorkshire
- Region: Yorkshire and the Humber
- Country: England
- Sovereign state: United Kingdom
- Post town: SKIPTON
- Postcode district: BD23
- Police: North Yorkshire
- Fire: North Yorkshire
- Ambulance: Yorkshire

Beckermonds is a small hamlet in the county of North Yorkshire, England. The hamlet lies at the western end of Langstrothdale, at the confluence of Green Field Beck and Oughtershaw Beck, which join to form the start of the River Wharfe.

The toponym, first recorded in 1241 as Beckermotes, is from the Old Norse bekkjar mót, meaning "the meeting of the streams". The intrusive n was added later under the influence of Old French mont, "hill".

The hamlet consists of five dwellings. Population is six. Two of the cottages are run as holiday lets which, when fully occupied, add twelve to this figure.

Until 1974 it was part of the West Riding of Yorkshire. From 1974 to 2023 it was part of the Craven District, it is now administered by the unitary North Yorkshire Council.

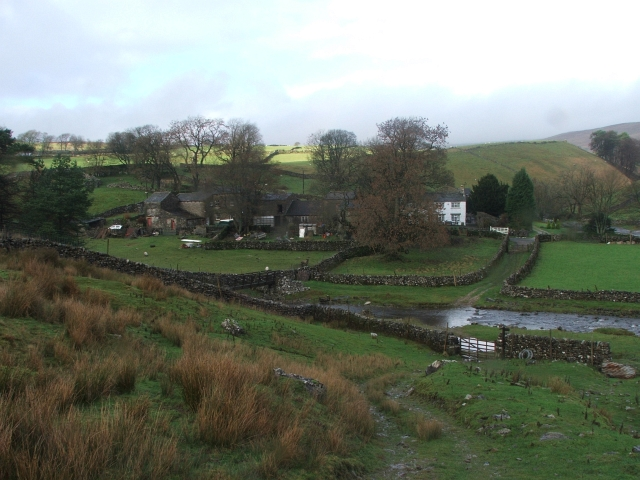
View of Beckermonds
