= Pennine Journey =

247-mile footpath in northern England

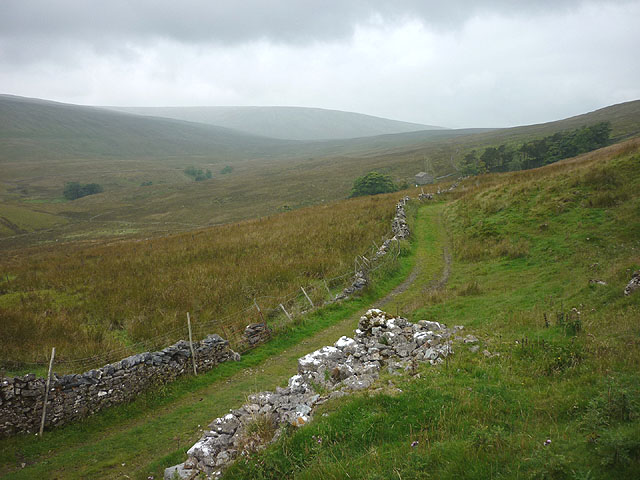
- Track on Grisedale Brow
- Length: 247 miles (398 km)
- Location: North Yorkshire; County Durham; Northumberland; Cumbria
- Established: 2004
- Trailheads: Settle, North Yorkshire
- Use: Hiking
- Season: All year
- Hazards: Severe weather
- Website: Pennine Journey

Pennine Journey is a 247-mile (398 km) circular trail that starts and ends in Settle, North Yorkshire, England. The route is based on a walk taken by Alfred Wainwright in 1938 and described by him in a book published in 1986. From Settle, the route heads north through North Yorkshire, County Durham and Northumberland to Hadrian's Wall, then extending along the wall for 21 miles (34 km), before turning south through Cumbria to head back to the starting point.

== Route ==
The route begins (and ends) in Settle, North Yorkshire, heading north along the eastern edge of the Pennines, over Penyghent where the trail meets the Pennine Way. The path continues past Askrigg to Tan Hill (where it enters the North Pennines AONB), Bowes and Tees High Force to Hexham. After Hexham it turns westwards along 21 miles (34 km) of Hadrian's Wall, before heading south at Greenhead to Alston, Appleby, Kirkby Stephen, and Garsdale. It then turns westwards through Grisedale and across the northern edge of Baugh Fell to Sedbergh, before heading south over Whernside and Ingleborough (with a dog-leg to Ingleton), and returning to Settle. The walk is divided into eighteen stages, with some short lengths of just over 7.25 miles (11.67 km) (Settle to Horton-in-Ribblesdale), and the longest being just shy of 18 miles (29 km) (Sedbergh to Ingleton).

Several Ordnance Survey maps are needed to complete the route (OL2: Yorkshire Dales southern and western areas, OL19: Howgill Fells & Upper Eden Valley, OL30: Yorkshire Dales northern and central areas, OL31: North Pennines, OL41: Forest of Bowland & Ribblesdal, OL43: Hadrian's Wall, and 307: Consett & Derwent Reservoir).

One of those who developed the route in 2004 stated that it had two advantages over the Pennine Way: it is a circular route, and takes in all three of the Yorkshire peaks, as opposed to just one on the Pennine Way.

Pennine Journey stages
Day	Section	Distance	Cumulative distance	Ascent
1	Settle to Horton-in-Ribblesdale	7.25 miles (11.67 km)	7.25 miles (11.67 km)	1,824 feet (556 m)
2	Horton-in-Ribblesdale to Buckden	12.75 miles (20.52 km)	20 miles (32 km)	2,218 feet (676 m)
3	Buckden to Gunnerside	17.5 miles (28.2 km)	37.5 miles (60.4 km)	2,966 feet (904 m)
4	Gunnerside to Bowes	17.5 miles (28.2 km)	55 miles (89 km)	2,146 feet (654 m)
5	Bowes to Middleton-in-Teesdale	12.5 miles (20.1 km)	67.5 miles (108.6 km)	1,581 feet (482 m)
6	Middleton-in-Teesdale to Westgate	15.75 miles (25.35 km)	83.25 miles (133.98 km)	2,306 feet (703 m)
7	Westgate to Blanchland	10.75 miles (17.30 km)	94 miles (151 km)	1,522 feet (464 m)
8	Blanchland to Hexham	11.75 miles (18.91 km)	105.75 miles (170.19 km)	1,230 feet (370 m)
9	Hexham to Housesteads	15.5 miles (24.9 km)	121.25 miles (195.13 km)	2,175 feet (663 m)
10	Housesteads to Greenhead	9.75 miles (15.69 km)	131 miles (211 km)	1,526 feet (465 m)
11	Greenhead to Alston	17 miles (27 km)	148 miles (238 km)	2,451 feet (747 m)
12	Alston to Milburn	17.75 miles (28.57 km)	164.75 miles (265.14 km)	2,500 feet (760 m)
13	Milburn to Appleby-in-Westmorland	8.25 miles (13.28 km)	173 miles (278 km)	771 feet (235 m)
14	Appleby-in-Westmorland to Kirkby Stephen	16 miles (26 km)	189 miles (304 km)	1,585 feet (483 m)
15	Kirkby Stephen to Garsdale	12.25 miles (19.71 km)	201.25 miles (323.88 km)	1,909 feet (582 m)
16	Garsdale to Sedbergh	13.75 miles (22.13 km)	215 miles (346 km)	1,949 feet (594 m)
17	Sedbergh to Ingleton	17.75 miles (28.57 km)	232.75 miles (374.57 km)	3,133 feet (955 m)
18	Ingleton to Settle	14.25 miles (22.93 km)	247 miles (398 km)	3,081 feet (939 m)

== History ==
The route was first traversed by Alfred Wainwright in 1938, though the modern version differs somewhat from the route Wainwright took, with most of the modern-day walk being off-road. Wainwright had travelled from Blackburn to Settle to undertake the walk in 1938 as a way of coping with the looming Second World War.

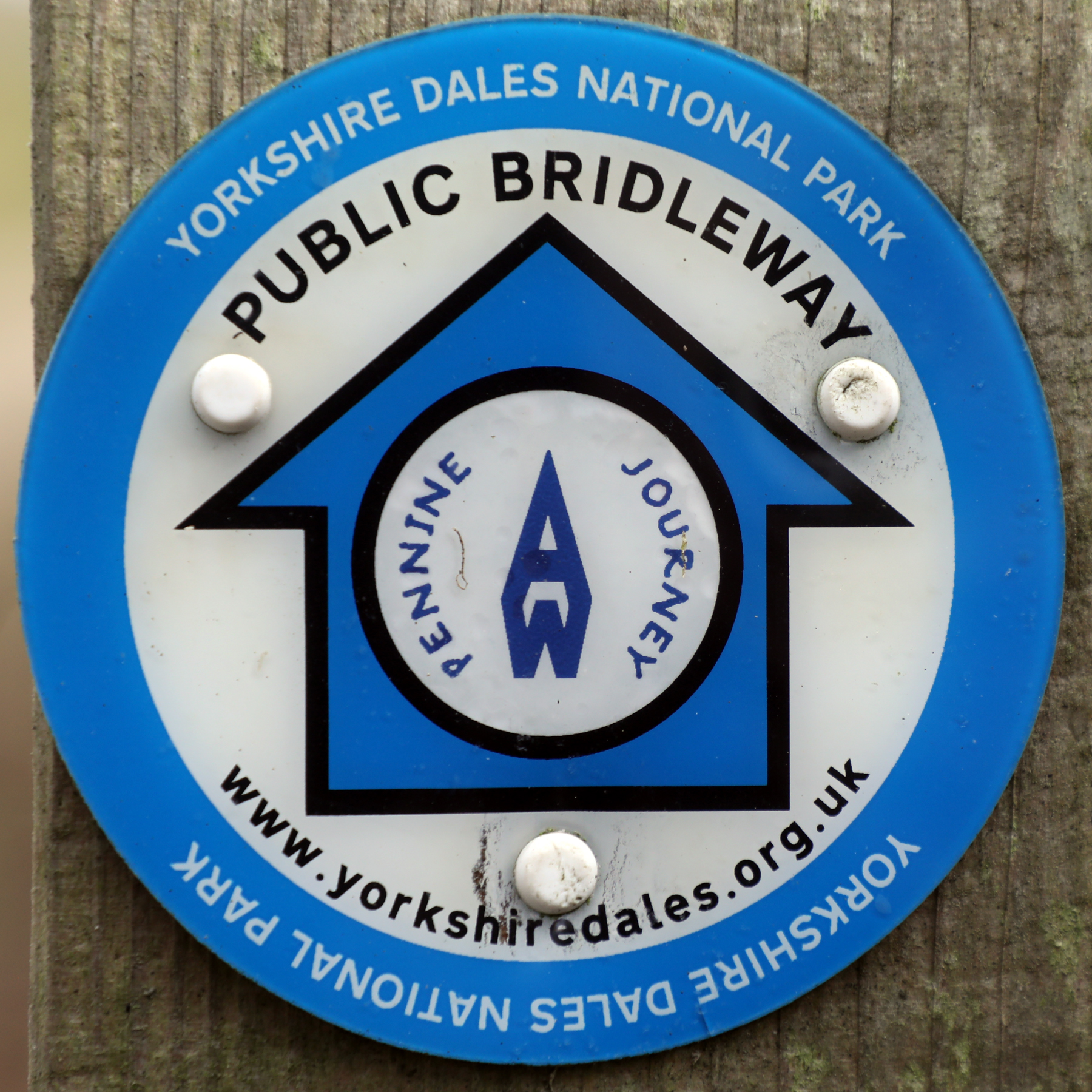
Pennine Journey waymarker

Well now, what Adolf Hitler said and did in September 1938 gave me and many others disquieting pains in the stomach. He frightened us. He made us feel sick. For he couldn't enlarge his boundaries without trampling on our friends....These then, were the days of crisis...

He meticulously detailed his route, which encourages the modern-day hiker to take the walk in an anticlockwise direction.

In 1998, two walkers developed the route, and persuaded the Wainwright Society to adopt it in 2004. In 2016, it was marked on Ordnance Survey maps for the first time. In 2020, the Wainwright Society launched a campaign to have the path recognised as a National Trail, which would mean that it would be promoted by Natural England. There are hopes that the trail could be designated by September 2028, the 90th anniversary of when Wainwright himself started the walk.

== Waymarking ==
The waymarker for the trail is either a blue or yellow arrow with a circle inset within it. Inside the circle are the letters A and W with the A on top and the W below both in blue. The A and W are Alfred Wainwright's initials.
