= Yockenthwaite =

Hamlet in North Yorkshire, England

Coordinates: 54.20665°N 2.14714°W

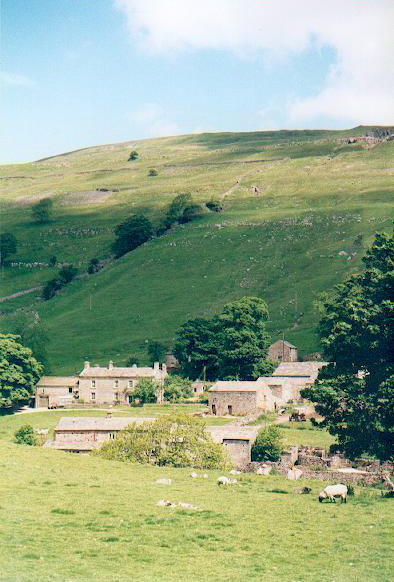
- Yockenthwaite

- Location within North Yorkshire
- OS grid reference: SD905790
- Civil parish: Buckden
- Unitary authority: North Yorkshire
- Ceremonial county: North Yorkshire
- Region: Yorkshire and the Humber
- Country: England
- Sovereign state: United Kingdom
- Police: North Yorkshire
- Fire: North Yorkshire
- Ambulance: Yorkshire
- UK Parliament: Skipton and Ripon

Yockenthwaite is a hamlet in the county of North Yorkshire, England. It lies in the Langstrothdale valley in the Yorkshire Dales National Park. Yockenthwaite is 20 miles (32 km) north of Skipton and 8 miles (13 km) south of Hawes. The name of the hamlet is said to derive from Eoghan's clearing in a wood.

Yockenthwaite lies on the north bank of the River Wharfe. It is better known than may be expected because a children's television character from The Rottentrolls takes its name from the hamlet.

The hamlet is connected to the road that winds up and down Langstroth dale by a grade II listed bridge from the early 18th century. This is the only route into and out of the hamlet by road.

Yockenthwaite Hall is a farmhouse dating from the 18th century. It is a Grade II listed building. Yockenthwaite Bridge is also a Grade II listed building.

Until 1974 it was part of the West Riding of Yorkshire. From 1974 to 2023 it was part of the Craven District, it is now administered by the unitary North Yorkshire Council.

== Yockenthwaite stone circle ==
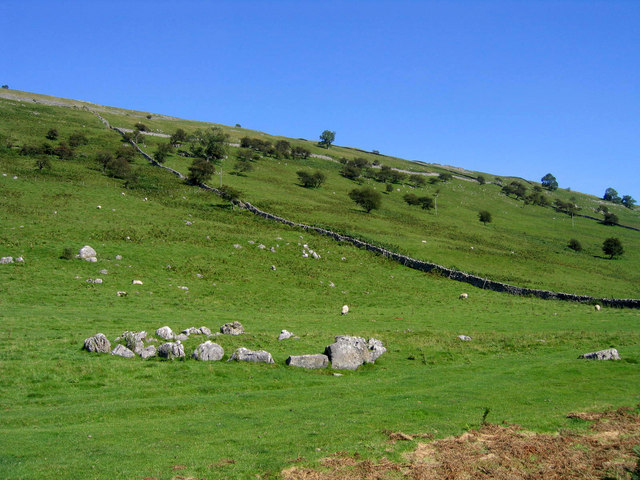
Yockenthwaite Stone Circle

Just to the west of the village by Yockenthwaite Cave, are some ancient stones arranged in a circle. The stones, which are now a scheduled monument, are 25 feet (7.6 m) in diameter and believed to be Bronze Age in origin. The overall size and layout of the stones gave rise to the nickname of the Giant's Grave. Some of the stones have been taken and re-used for drystone walls and buildings.

Speight refers to the site as a "druid's circle" and whilst it has been described as a stone circle, it is believed to be a ring cairn. Whilst 23 stones remain extant, there are spaces for three to four more stones in the circle, which have been removed.

== See also ==
- Listed buildings in Buckden, North Yorkshire
