= Wharfedale =

Valley in Yorkshire, England

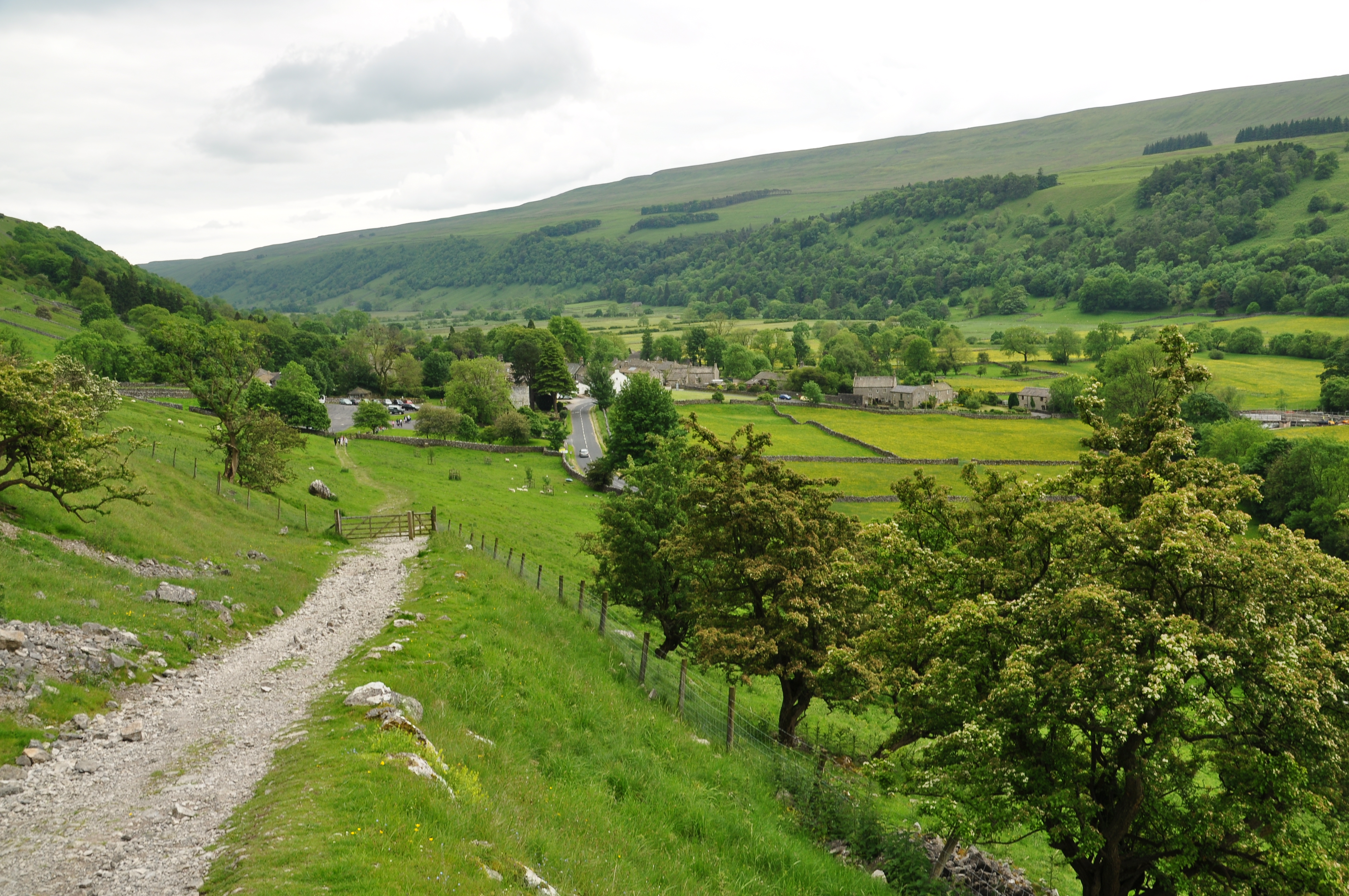
- Wharfedale near Buckden
- Length: 50 mi (80 km)

Geography
- Location: Yorkshire, England
- District: North and West Yorkshire
- Coordinates: 53.88333°N 1.45°W
- River: River Wharfe
- Interactive map of Wharfedale

Wharfedale (/ˈhwɔːrfdeɪl/ WHORF-dayl) is one of the Yorkshire Dales. It is situated at source in North Yorkshire and then flows into West Yorkshire and forms the upper valley of the River Wharfe. Towns and villages in Wharfedale (downstream, from west to east) include Buckden, (Note: 54.191°N 2.091°W) Kettlewell, Conistone, Grassington, Hebden, Bolton Abbey, Addingham, Ilkley, Burley-in-Wharfedale, Otley, Pool-in-Wharfedale, Arthington, Collingham and Wetherby. (Note: 53.928°N 1.386°W) Beyond Wetherby, the valley opens out and becomes part of the Vale of York.

The section from the river's source to around Addingham is known as Upper Wharfedale. It lies in North Yorkshire and the Yorkshire Dales National Park. The first 15 miles (24 km) or so is known as Langstrothdale, including the settlements of Beckermonds, Yockenthwaite and Hubberholme, famous for its church, the resting place of the writer J. B. Priestley. As it turns southwards, the Wharfe then runs through a green and lush valley, with limestone outcrops, such as Kilnsey Crag, and woodland, generally quite unusual in the Dales.

Below Addingham, the dale broadens and turns to the east. This section is shared between North Yorkshire and West Yorkshire and includes the towns of Ilkley, Otley and Wetherby. The northern side of Lower Wharfedale, opposite Ilkley, Burley-in-Wharfedale and Otley, is in the Nidderdale Area of Outstanding Natural Beauty.

The Yorkshire Dales Rivers Trust has a remit to conserve the ecological condition of Wharfedale, Wensleydale, Swaledale and Nidderdale catchments from their headwaters to the Humber Estuary.

== History ==
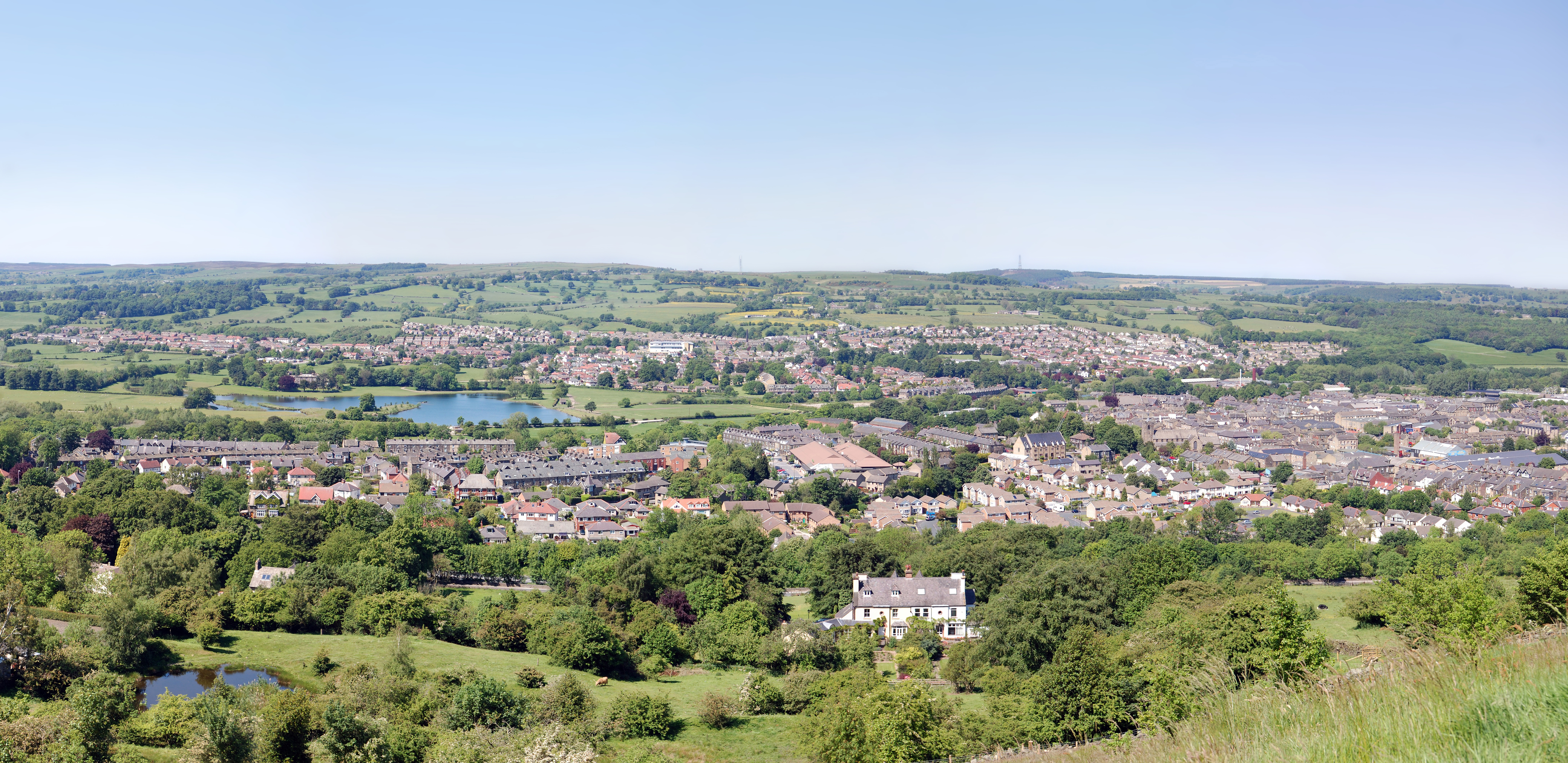
Lower Wharfedale from above Otley

The Wharfedale valley was cut into the shape we know today during the last ice age (the Devensian Glaciation). The valley was transformed into its classic U-shaped state between 18,000 and 12,000 years ago by the Wharfedale Glacier, though this was cutting through a channel that had already had a river draining water away to the east through what is now Wharfedale, and also to the north through what is now Bishopdale and then Wensleydale.

Evidence of human settlement has been found dating back to Neolithic times and the valley has plenty of artefacts relating to the Celtic, Roman and Anglo-Saxon periods. The Romans built a road over Stake Moss into what is now the village of Bainbridge in Wensleydale.

The Anglo-Saxon influence remains in modern times, with most settlements in Upper Wharfedale having Anglo-Saxon derived names.

The name of the valley is derived from the principal river that flows through it: the Wharfe, which comes from the Old English Weorf or Old Norse Hverfr, with both taken as meaning winding river. The River Wharfe starts at the confluence (at the hamlet of Beckermonds) of the Oughtershaw Beck and the Green Field Beck, each of which originates at the Pennine watershed, some 4 miles (6 km) north-east of Ribblehead. The valley roughly follows a south-easterly direction, providing a border between West Yorkshire (on the south side) and North Yorkshire.

Between Oughtershaw Moss and Wetherby, the valley runs for 50 miles (80 km). The uppermost part of the valley is known as Langstrothdale. Below Beckermonds the river is known as the River Wharfe. Wetherby is traditionally seen as the foot of Wharfedale, even though the river continues on through the Vale of York.

The valley has been used largely for agriculture, and is now criss-crossed with stone walls and stone barns that evidence its use down the centuries.

== Geology ==
The geology of the valley is split, with Upper Wharfedale consisting of carboniferous limestone of the Yoredale series. In the lower part of Wharfedale, around Ilkley and Otley, the underlying stone is mostly millstone grit, which can be seen best at the Cow and Calf rocks on the south side of the valley on Ilkley Moor. The Bramley Almanac for 1931 lists 'Earthquake in Wharfedale' for 15 December 1859.

== Wharfedale Ward ==
As an electoral subdivision Wharfedale is a ward in the north east of the City of Bradford metropolitan borough. It consists of the settlements of Burley-in-Wharfedale, Burley Woodhead and Menston along with surrounding moorland. The population of the ward taken at the 2011 Census was 11,836.

== Deanery of South Craven and Wharfedale ==
In 2017, in consideration of regional geography, the Church of England changed its subdivisions and re-grouped the Deanery of Wharfedale with that of South Craven, in order that the similar regions can work together more effectively.

== Wharfedale in culture ==
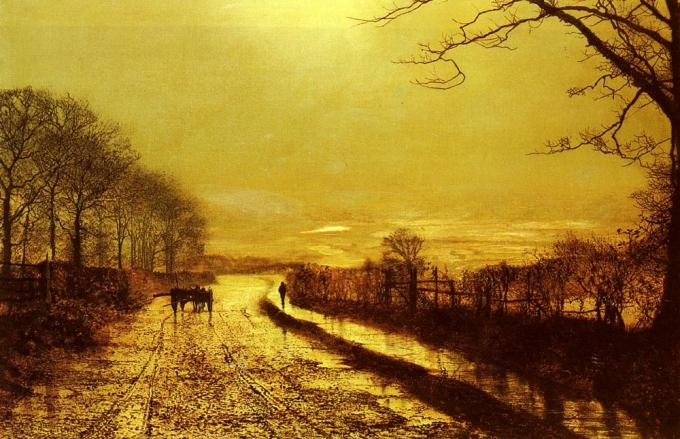
John Atkinson Grimshaw – Wharfedale 1872

One of the most renowned painters of the Victorian era, John Atkinson Grimshaw, portrayed the area in his piece, "Moonlight, Wharfedale" (1871 – oil on card 17 1/2 by 13 1/2 inches [44 cm × 34 cm]). He is known as one of the best and most accomplished nightscape and townscape artists of all time, and this painting is a prime example of his mastery. J. M. W. Turner also visited and painted scenes around Otley and Ilkley. Turner was commissioned to paint Kilnsey Crag, which he created as an oil painting in 1816.

The valley was featured in episode three of the BBC Two series, The Yorkshire Dales.
