= Halton Gill =

Hamlet and civil parish in North Yorkshire, England

Coordinates: 54°11′05″N 2°11′05″W

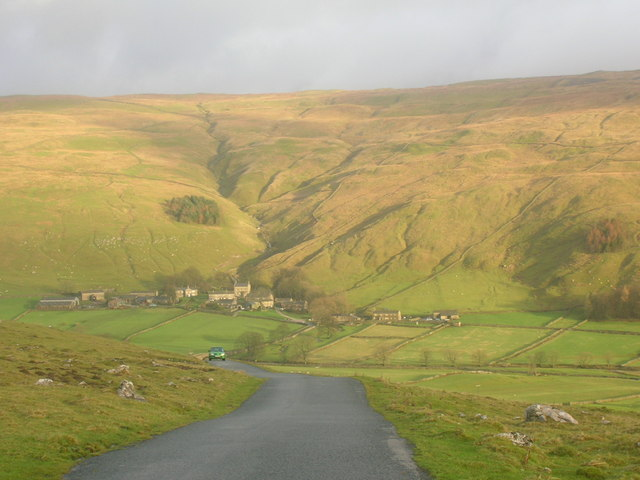
- Approaching Halton Gill from Pen-y-ghent

- Location within North Yorkshire
- Population: 60
- OS grid reference: SD880764
- Civil parish: Halton Gill
- Unitary authority: North Yorkshire
- Ceremonial county: North Yorkshire
- Region: Yorkshire and the Humber
- Country: England
- Sovereign state: United Kingdom
- Post town: SKIPTON
- Postcode district: BD23
- Police: North Yorkshire
- Fire: North Yorkshire
- Ambulance: Yorkshire
- UK Parliament: Skipton and Ripon

Halton Gill is a hamlet and civil parish in Littondale in the Yorkshire Dales in North Yorkshire, England. It is situated 2 miles (3.2 km) up Littondale from Litton. A minor road leads south west to Silverdale and Stainforth in Ribblesdale.

The name of the hamlet was recorded in 1457 as Haltonghyll. The name derives from a combination of Old English and Old Norse and means the nook of land (or ravine) with a small valley by a farmstead and a stream.

The civil parish includes the hamlets of Foxup and Hesleden. To the south the parish rises to the summits of Plover Hill and Pen-y-Ghent. The population of the civil parish was estimated at 60 in 2012.

From Halton Gill there is a bridleway over the Horse Head Pass to the north east to Yockenthwaite in Langstrothdale. This path was used by the priest from Hubberholme to reach the small chapel in Halton Gill. To the west paths lead to the summit of Pen-y-ghent via Plover Hill.

The 2010 Sainsbury's Christmas advert with celebrity chef, Jamie Oliver, was filmed in Halton Gill. Also filmed in the same year, but not released until 2012, was the film The Woman in Black, which used Halton Gill for filming as the fictional village of Crythin Gifford.

Halton Gill was historically a township in the ancient parish of Arncliffe, part of Staincliffe Wapentake in the West Riding of Yorkshire. Halton Gill became a separate civil parish in 1866. St John the Baptist's Church, Halton Gill was built in the Mediaeval period, while the current building dates from 1636. The adjacent school closed in 1958, and the church in the late 1970s, following which both were converted into a house.

The parish was transferred to the new county of North Yorkshire in 1974. From 1974 to 2023 it was part of the Craven District, it is now administered by the unitary North Yorkshire Council.

== See also ==
- Listed buildings in Halton Gill
