= Scoska Wood =

National Nature Reserve in North Yorkshire, England

- IUCN category IV (habitat/species management area)
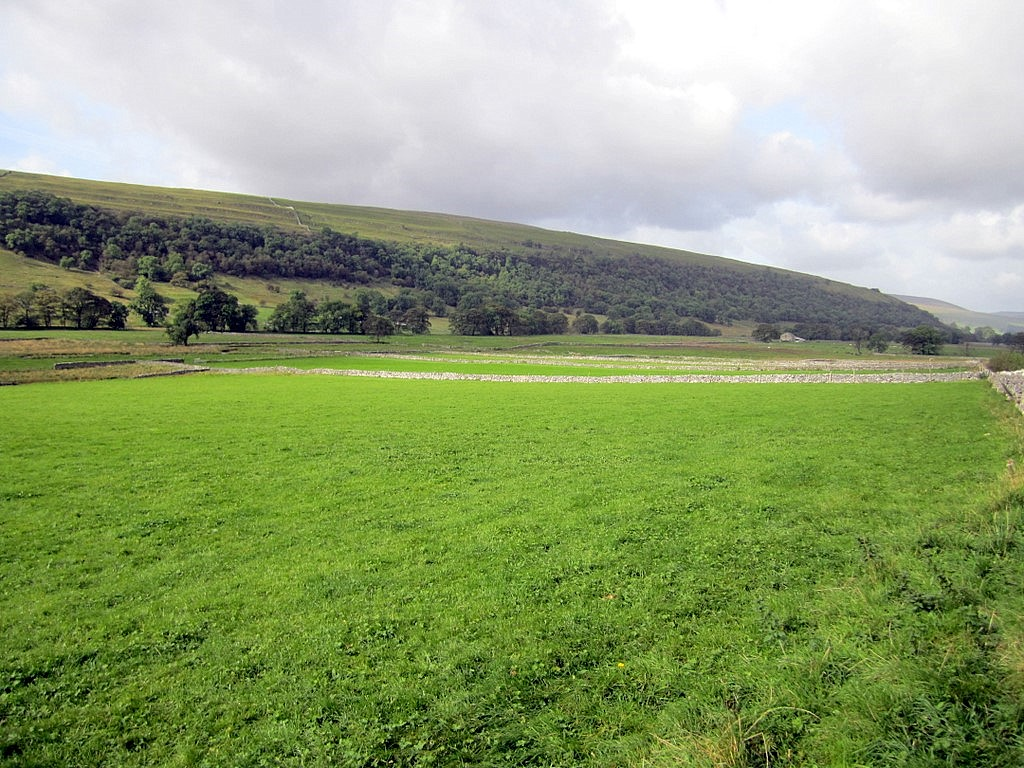
- Littondale looking north west; Scoska Wood is the slim band of trees on the valley side

- Location within North Yorkshire
- Location: Arncliffe, Littondale, North Yorkshire
- Nearest town: Grassington
- Coordinates: 54.151°N 2.137°W
- Area: 10.92 acres (4.42 ha)
- Average elevation: 1,038 feet (316.3 m)
- Max. elevation: 1,210 feet (370 m)
- Min. elevation: 820 feet (250 m)
- Designated: 1975 (SSSI); 1992 (IUCN Category IV)
- Named for: Scoska Moor

Scoska Wood is an IUCN Category IV – habitat or species management area, a British national nature reserve (NNR), and a Site of Special Scientific Interest (SSSI) in Littondale, North Yorkshire, England. It is a managed ancient woodland, known for its ash trees, grasses and moths. It was designated as an SSSI in 1975, and was awarded its IUCN status in 1992.

== History ==
Scoska Wood, along with many other woodlands in Wharfedale and Littondale, is classified as ancient wood, being in existence since at least 1500, and has been carefully or traditionally managed. The wood sits on the south-eastern side of Littondale underneath Scoska Moor, from which it takes its name. Scoska Moor was recorded in 1768 as Scoscoe Moor, and it is thought that the second part of the word (ska), derives from the Old Norse Skogr; meaning wood. The underlying rock is carboniferous limestone, and the wood consists mainly of ash trees which "cling" to the steep valley side, with the wood and meadowsides traditionally managed to encourage herb-rich grasslands. Other trees in the wood include larch, spruce and birch.

The SSSI area extends from the grassland of the valley floor up to and along the steep sides of Scoska Moor. As such, it ranges in height from 820 feet (250 m) to 1,210 feet (370 m), with an average height of 1,038 feet (316.3 m).

First designated as an SSSI in 1975, the boundaries of the protected area were revised in 1986. The citation for Scoska Wood SSI is

The name Scoska Wood is applied to a site comprising both woodland and pasture situated on the northeast facing slope of Littondale between Litton and Arncliffe. The underlying Carboniferous Limestone has a major influence on the flora. Woodland clings to the limestone scars and upper slopes, and grades into herb-rich neutral or calcareous pasture below; at which boundary a number of springs emerge, giving rise to flush communities.

In 1992, the wood was designated as a IUCN Category IV area. The IUCN website lists Category IV areas needing "...a management approach used in areas that have already undergone substantial modification, necessitating protection of remaining fragments, with or without intervention".

== Access ==
The local bus service from Skipton through Upper Wharfedale does not serve Littondale direct, but does pass the valley mouth, some 3.7 miles (6 km) south of Scoska Wood, where passengers can alight and walk up the valley. A public footpath traverses the eastern edge of the wood where it meets the valley floor of Littondale. This path passes through the grassland area of the Skoska Wood SSSI, but does not go through the woodland. However, in February 2014, new access rights were granted into the wood from the adjacent path.

== Species ==
The wood is one of two locations in Wharfedale for the barred tooth-striped moth, which was only first observed in Yorkshire in 1959. The mountain whorl snail has been observed in two different locations in the wood in 2003 and 2006. Besides its ash trees, Scoska Wood is an ideal place for baneberry and limestone grasslands, which allow growth of blue moor-grass, fairy flax and salad burnet. In 2012, a willow hybrid tree was discovered in the wood. The tree is believed to be a cross between a dark-leaved willow and a tea-leaved willow. The presence of herb paris testifies to the old nature of the wood as it only grows in woodlands like Scoska and nearby Hawkswick Wood.
