= List of crossings of the River Ribble =

This is a list of crossings of the River Ribble in Northern England.

Key to heritage status
Status	Criteria
II*	Grade II* listed. Particularly important bridge of more than special interest
II	Grade II listed. Bridge of national importance and special interest

Crossing	Date	Coordinates	Heritage status	Locality	Notes	Image
Ribblehead Viaduct	1875	54.2104°N 2.3702°W	II*	Ribblehead	Settle–Carlisle line Crosses head of valley, not strictly the river itself	Ingleton_Ribblehead_Viaduct
Footbridge		54.1805°N 2.3206°W	-	Selside		Crossing the River Ribble (geograph 6616181)
Pennine Bridleway Bridge		54.1729°N 2.3136°W	-	Selside	Pennine Bridleway	Over the River Ribble (geograph 6864642)
New Inn Bridge	Late 18th Cent	54.1497°N 2.2964°W	II	Horton in Ribblesdale	B6479	New_Inn_Bridge,_Horton_in_Ribblesdale_-_geograph.org.uk_-_1807840
Footbridge		54.1495°N 2.2964°W	-	Horton in Ribblesdale		Footbridge at Horton in Ribblesdale - geograph.org.uk - 431037
Footbridge		54.137°N 2.2989°W	-	Crag Hill Farm		Footbridge over the River Ribble - geograph.org.uk - 1176013
Footbridge		54.1267°N 2.2915°W	-	Studfold		Footbridge over the River Ribble - geograph.org.uk - 5470938
Railway Bridge		54.1234°N 2.2909°W	-		Settle–Carlisle line	Railway_Bridge_north_of_Helwith_Bridge_-_geograph.org.uk_-_3575885
Helwith Bridge	1875	54.1214°N 2.2902°W	II	Helwith Bridge		Helwith_Bridge,_Yorkshire_Dales_National_Park_-_geograph.org.uk_-_92005
Farm Access Bridge		54.1168°N 2.29°W	-	Helwith Bridge		
Railway Bridge		54.1124°N 2.2867°W	-		Settle–Carlisle line	The_rail_bridge_over_the_River_Ribble_-_geograph.org.uk_-_3572301
Sheriff Brow Viaduct		54.1096°N 2.2844°W	-		Settle–Carlisle line	Train_near_Stainforth_-_geograph.org.uk_-_123072
Knight Stainforth Bridge	Late 17th Cent	54.1008°N 2.2801°W	II	Stainforth		Stainforth_Packhorse_Bridge_and_the_River_Ribble_-_geograph.org.uk_-_433333
Holmehead Bridge		54.0843°N 2.2806°W	-		Locks Cottages Access	Footbridge_over_the_River_Ribble_at_Holmehead_-_geograph.org.uk_-_5762541
Settle Bridge	17th Cent	54.0724°N 2.2818°W	II*	Settle	B6480	Settle_Bridge_Geograph-3568620-by-John-Slater
Settle Footbridge		54.0724°N 2.282°W	-	Settle		Two_bridges_over_the_Ribble,_Settle_-_geograph.org.uk_-_5186617
Giggleswick Memorial Bridge		54.0707°N 2.2856°W	-	Settle		Giggleswick_Memorial_Bridge_-_geograph.org.uk_-_5422802
Penny Bridge		54.0653°N 2.2855°W	-	Settle		
A65 Bridge	1988	54.055°N 2.2926°W	-	Settle	A65	Road_and_rail_bridges_over_the_Ribble_-_geograph.org.uk_-_4904584
Railway Bridge		54.0547°N 2.2927°W	-	Settle	Leeds–Morecambe line	Road_and_rail_bridges_over_the_Ribble_-_geograph.org.uk_-_4904584
Cow Bridge	Late 18th Cent	54.0085°N 2.2649°W	II		B6478	Cow_Bridge_viewed_from_Flat_Lane_-_geograph.org.uk_-_357482
Halton Bridge	Mid 18th Cent	53.9924°N 2.2275°W	II			Halton Bridge - geograph.org.uk - 5092047
Paythorne Bridge	17th Cent	53.9572°N 2.2589°W	II	Paythorne		Paythorne_Bridge_-_geograph.org.uk_-_927834
Gisburn Bridge	18th Cent	53.9424°N 2.2729°W	II	Gisburn		Gisburn_Bridge_-_geograph.org.uk_-_8002018
Sawley Bridge	c.1800	53.9151°N 2.3442°W	II	Sawley		Sawley_Bridge_-_geograph.org.uk_-_5133047
Grindleton Bridge		53.9001°N 2.3652°W	-	Grindleton		Grindleton Bridge (geograph 7567005)
West Bradford Bridge	c. 1800	53.891°N 2.3897°W	II	West Bradford		Bradford Bridge - geograph.org.uk - 2462316
Brungerley Bridge		53.8811°N 2.3991°W	-	Clitheroe	B6478	Brungerley Bridge, River Ribble, Clitheroe - geograph.org.uk - 5767523
Footbridge		53.8728°N 2.4142°W	-	Clitheroe		New_footbridge_over_the_River_Ribble,_west_of_Clitheroe_-_geograph.org.uk_-_1572968
Edisford Bridge	Late Medieval	53.8684°N 2.4176°W	II	Clitheroe	B6243	Edisford_Bridge_-_geograph.org.uk_-_3796405
Aqueduct		53.8503°N 2.4214°W	-	Whalley	Haweswater Aqueduct	Aqueduct_over_the_River_Ribble_-_geograph.org.uk_-_242100
Mitton Bridge	Early 19th Cent	53.844°N 2.4334°W	II	Little Mitton	B6246	Mitton_Bridge
Aqueduct		53.8309°N 2.4697°W	-			Ribble_Aqueduct_-_geograph.org.uk_-_1048629
New Dinckley Footbridge		53.8245°N 2.4785°W	-		Replaced earlier suspension bridge	New_Dinkley_Footbridge_-_geograph.org.uk_-_5907842
Ribchester Bridge	1789	53.8159°N 2.5143°W	II	Ribchester	B6245	Ribchester_Bridge_-_geograph.org.uk_-_4459936
Thirlmere Aqueduct	1891-2	53.7785°N 2.6108°W	-	Samlesbury	Thirlmere Aqueduct	Thirlmere Aqueduct across the River Ribble (geograph 8250354)
Samlesbury Bridge		53.7658°N 2.6362°W	-	Samlesbury	M6 motorway Main and slip road bridges	
Brockholes Bridge		53.765°N 2.6439°W	-	Preston	A59	
Walton Bridge	1781	53.7528°N 2.6795°W	II	Preston	A6	
Old Tram Bridge		53.7519°N 2.6966°W	-	Avenham Park, Preston	Former Lancaster Canal Tramroad. Pedestrian/cycle, closed in 2019; demolished in 2024. Rebuilt and scheduled to reopen in spring 2026.	Old Tram Bridge, Preston 232-01
Avenham Park Bridge	1849	53.7513°N 2.7025°W	-	Avenham Park / Miller Park, Preston	Former East Lancashire Railway, now pedestrian/cycle	Former railway bridge, Avenham Park, Preston (geograph 5111013 by Stephen Richards)
Preston Railway Viaduct	1838	53.7497°N 2.7062°W	II	Miller Park, Preston	West Coast Main Line	River Ribble, North Union Railway Bridge - geograph.org.uk - 4315444
Pipelines	1881	53.7486°N 2.7134°W	-	Preston	Former West Lancashire Railway. Only the pillars survive, supporting water and gas pipelines.	Pipe bridge - geograph.org.uk - 1474954
Penwortham Old Bridge	1759	53.7488°N 2.7141°W	II	Preston	Pedestrian/cycle	River Ribble, Old Penwortham Bridge - geograph.org.uk - 4315464
Penwortham New Bridge	1912	53.7538°N 2.7177°W	-	Preston	B5254	Penwortham Bridge - geograph.org.uk - 3904032
Guild Way Bridge	c.1984	53.7566°N 2.7209°W	-	Preston	A59	Guildway Bridge, Preston - geograph.org.uk - 4336860
