= Hesleden, North Yorkshire =

Hamlet in North Yorkshire, England

Coordinates: 54.170°N 2.169°W

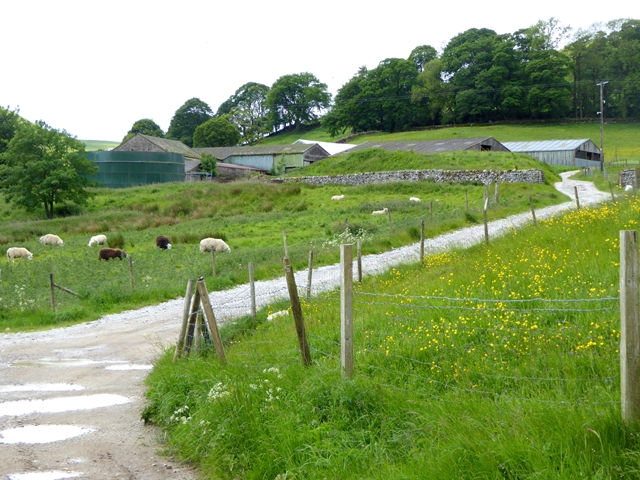
Nether Hesleden

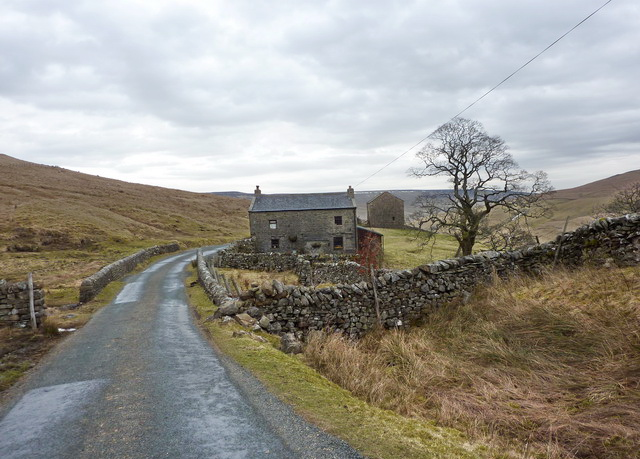
Upper Hesleden

Hesleden is a hamlet in Littondale in the Yorkshire Dales in England. It lies within the civil parish of Halton Gill in the county of North Yorkshire. Nether Hesleden is 1.1 miles (1.8 km) west of Litton, and Upper Hesleden is a further 1.4 miles (2.3 km) west, on the road from Halton Gill to Stainforth.

Until 1974 it was part of the West Riding of Yorkshire. From 1974 to 2023 it was part of the Craven District, it is now administered by the unitary North Yorkshire Council.

The name is first recorded (as Eseldene) in a charter of Fountains Abbey in about 1206. The name means "hazel valley", from the Old English hæsel and denu.
