= Silverdale, North Yorkshire =

Valley in the Yorkshire Dales, England

Coordinates: 54°08′11.7″N 2°14′37.3″W

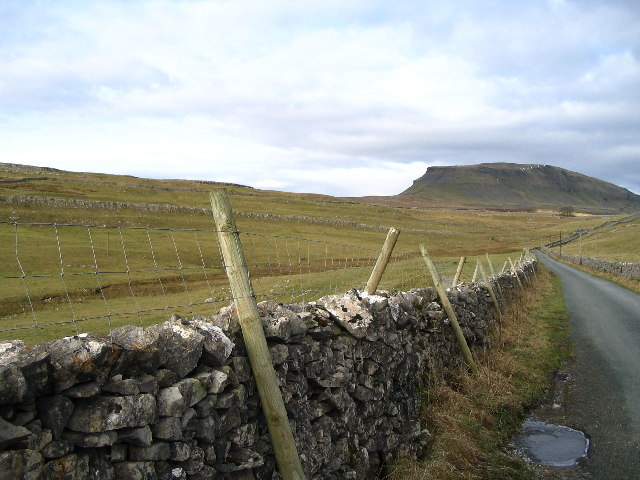
Looking up Silverdale to Pen-y-ghent

Silverdale is a minor dale in the Yorkshire Dales in North Yorkshire, England. It is a side dale of Ribblesdale, and lies west of Fountains Fell. The dale head is just south of Pen-y-ghent. The Pennine Way crosses the head of the dale.

A minor road runs through the dale from Stainforth to Halton Gill. 4 miles (6.4 km) along the road from Stainforth is the site of Neolithic burial ground known as Giants Graves.
