= Plover Hill =

Mountain in England

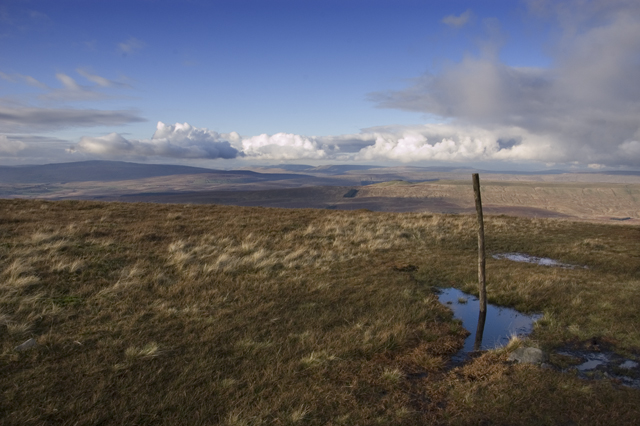

Highest point
- Elevation: 680 m (2,230 ft)
- Prominence: 59 m (194 ft)
- Parent peak: Pen-y-ghent
- Listing: Hewitt, Nuttall
- Coordinates: 54°10′21″N 2°13′58″W

Geography
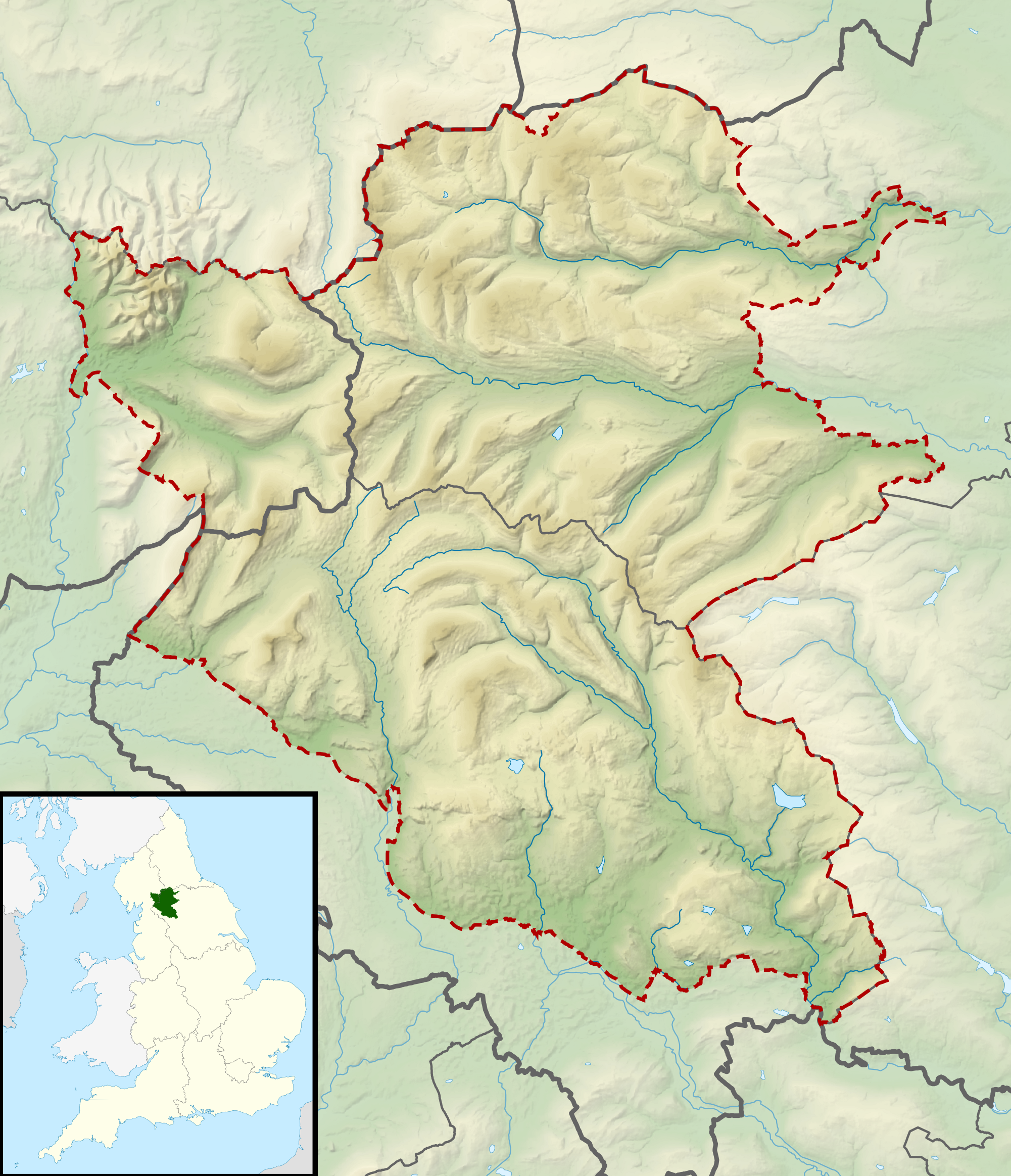
- Location within Yorkshire Dales
- Location: North Yorkshire, England
- Parent range: Yorkshire Dales
- OS grid: SD849752
- Topo map: OS Explorer OL2

Plover Hill is an area of moorland lying to the north of Pen-y-ghent in the Yorkshire Dales and connected to it by an unbroken area of high ground. Whilst the whole area is now "open access land", the main right-of-way footpaths come directly from the north off Foxup Road and directly from the south from the summit of Pen-y-ghent.

Plover Hill rises between two side valleys of Littondale: the valley of Hesleden Beck to the south and that of Foxup Beck to the north. It lies within the civil parish of Halton Gill.
