= Foxup =

Hamlet in North Yorkshire, England

Coordinates: 54.1860°N 2.2025°W

- Location within North Yorkshire
- Population: 17
- OS grid reference: SD868767
- Civil parish: Halton Gill
- Unitary authority: North Yorkshire
- Ceremonial county: North Yorkshire
- Region: Yorkshire and the Humber
- Country: England
- Sovereign state: United Kingdom
- Post town: SKIPTON
- Postcode district: BD23
- Dialling code: 01756
- Police: North Yorkshire
- Fire: North Yorkshire
- Ambulance: Yorkshire
- UK Parliament: Skipton & Ripon

Foxup is a hamlet in the Yorkshire Dales in the county of North Yorkshire, England. The hamlet is near Halton Gill and Litton and is 13 miles (21 km) north west of Grassington. Foxup is in the civil parish of Halton Gill.

The source of the River Skirfare starts here at the confluence of Foxup Beck and Cosh Beck. The bridge over Foxup Beck in the hamlet is 17th century and was listed Grade II in 1958.

The village marks the end of the main road through Littondale. There are a number of Public Footpaths and Bridleways in and around the village. The area is a mixture of sheep and beef farming. Dairy farming is harder than in comparison to other locations further down the valley because of the limitations on grass types and transportation of dairy produce out of the area.

The name Foxup is of Old English origin, meaning "fox valley", from fox and hop "small enclosed valley", apparently in contrast to the adjacent valley of Cosh Beck, known as Harrop, meaning "hare valley".

Until 1974 it was part of the West Riding of Yorkshire. From 1974 to 2023 it was part of the Craven District, it is now administered by the unitary North Yorkshire Council.

== Images ==
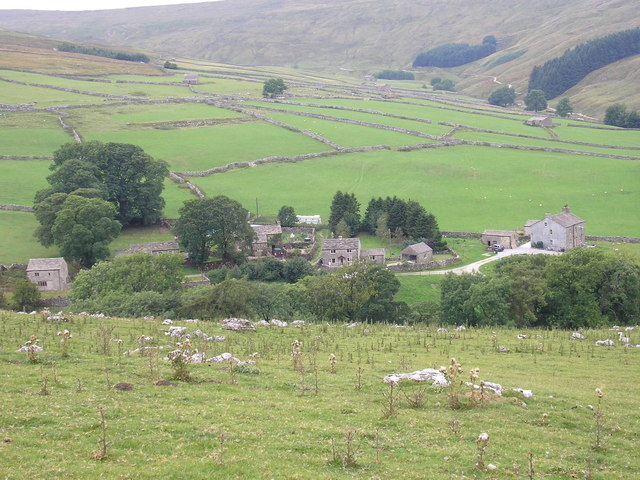
Foxup seen from Low Bergh

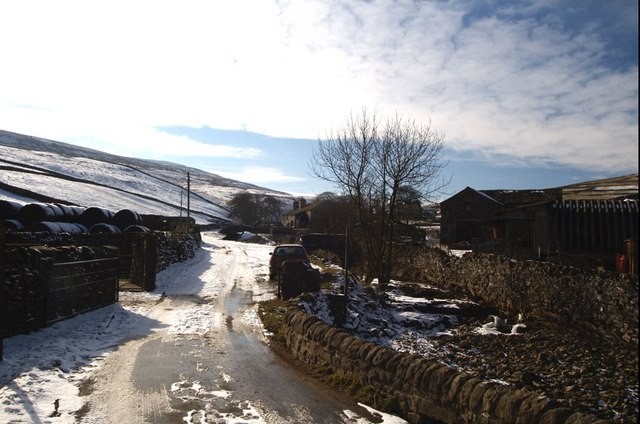
Foxup

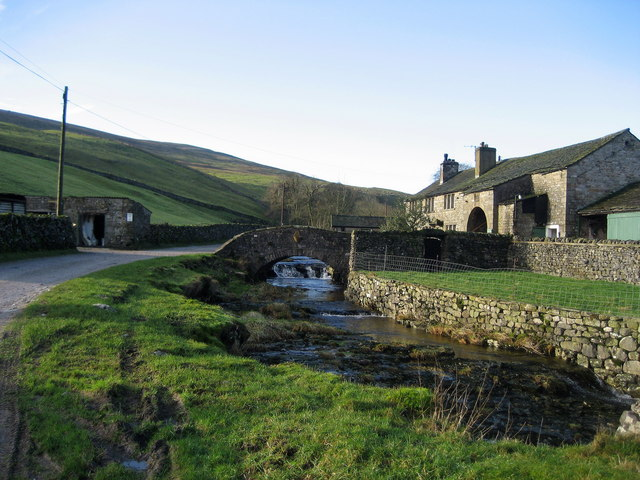
Foxup Beck
