= Listed buildings in Litton, North Yorkshire =

Litton is a civil parish in the county of North Yorkshire, England. It contains ten listed buildings that are recorded in the National Heritage List for England. All the listed buildings are designated at Grade II, the lowest of the three grades, which is applied to "buildings of national importance and special interest". The parish contains the village of Litton and the surrounding countryside, and the listed buildings consist of houses and farmhouses, a barn and a bridge.

== Buildings ==
Name and location	Photograph	Date	Notes
East Garth; 54.16079°N 2.14803°W	—	Early 17th century	A house and outbuilding in limestone with a stone slate roof. There are two storeys, and the house and the outbuilding each has one bay. The house has a doorway with chamfered jambs, a triangular head, a chamfered lintel and a hood mould. The windows are mullioned. The outbuilding contains a board door, and at the rear are mullioned windows, with some mullions missing.
Sawyers Garth; 54.16224°N 2.13818°W	—	Mid to late 17th century	The house, which has been altered and extended, is in limestone, with quoins, gutter brackets, and a stone slate roof with a moulded kneeler and gable coping on the left. There are two storeys, and on the front is a two-storey gabled porch, with three bays to its left and two to its right. The porch contains a doorway with a chamfered quoined jambs, and a lintel containing a recessed panel with scalloped edges and initials and a date in relief. To the right is a blocked doorway, its lintel having a triangular recess with initials and a date. The windows are mixed, some are mullioned, and others are sashes.
Elbeck Farmhouse and Cottage; 54.16286°N 2.14830°W	—	1704	The house is in limestone with a stone slate roof. There are two storeys and three bays. In the centre is a two-storey gabled porch containing a doorway with chamfered quoined jambs, and a lintel with a stepped chamfer, and initials and the date in relief. To its right is a recessed two-light mullioned window, and over the doorway and window is a continuous hood mould. Elsewhere, there are mullioned windows, with some mullions missing, and some windows have hood moulds.
New Bridge; 54.16362°N 2.15708°W		Early 18th century (possible)	The bridge carries a track over the River Skirfare, and is in stone. It consists of a single segmental arch, it is slightly hump-backed, and has rounded parapet coping.
Armistad Farmhouse; 54.16345°N 2.14751°W	—	1734	The farmhouse is in stone, with quoins, stone gutter brackets, and a stone slate roof with shaped kneelers and moulded gable copings. There are two storeys an attic and a cellar, and four bays. The doorway has a plain surround, an entablature and a moulded cornice, and above it is an initialled and dated stone plaque. The windows on the front are sashes, and at the rear are a stair window, mullioned windows, and a mullioned and transomed cellar window.
Barn west of Armistad Farmhouse; 54.16343°N 2.14779°W	—	c. 1734	The barn is in limestone, with quoins, and a stone slate roof with shaped kneelers and gable copings. There are about four bays, and it contains a cart entrance with a round outer arch, doorways and windows. On the right return is a flight of external steps with flat-coped side walls leading to a door with quoined jambs. Under the steps is a dog kennel, and in the gable are three rows of pigeon holes.
Croft House; 54.16336°N 2.14589°W	—	Mid 18th century	The house is in stone, with quoins, and a stone slate roof with shaped kneelers and gable copings. There are two storeys and three bays. The doorway has a cornice on consoles, and the windows are mullioned. Also on the front is a blocked doorway that has a lintel with two recessed panels, one dated and the other initialled.
The Green; 54.16313°N 2.14788°W	—	Mid to late 18th century	The house is in stone, with quoins, and a stone slate roof with shaped kneelers and gable copings. There are two storeys and two bays. The central doorway and the windows have plain surrounds.
Litton Hall; 54.16314°N 2.14538°W	—	Late 18th century	The house is in limestone, with quoins, stone gutter brackets, and a stone slate roof with moulded kneelers and gable copings. There are two storeys and three bays. The central doorway has a plain surround, a fanlight, and a cornice, and the windows are sashes in plain surrounds.
West Farmhouse; 54.16257°N 2.14246°W	—	Early to mid 19th century	The house is in stone, with projecting long and short quoins, and a hipped slate roof. There are two storeys and fronts of three and two bays. The central doorway has a fanlight, and a cornice on consoles. The ground floor windows are tripartite, and in the upper floor are sash windows.
