= Hawkswick =

Hamlet and civil parish in North Yorkshire, England

Coordinates: 54.130920°N 2.070910°W

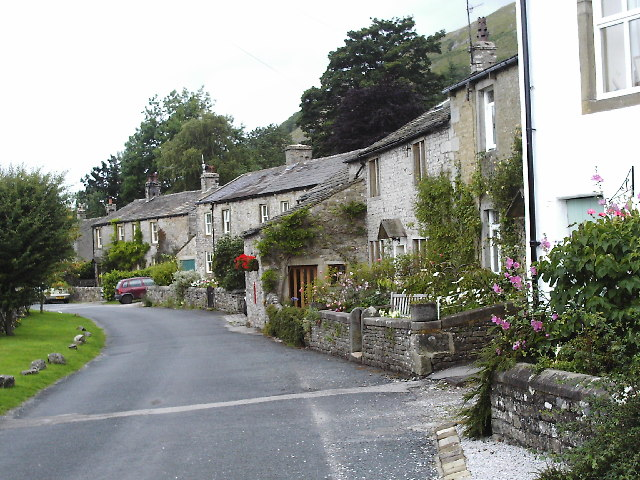
- Hawkswick

- Location within North Yorkshire
- Population: 70
- OS grid reference: SD 954 705
- Civil parish: Hawkswick
- Unitary authority: North Yorkshire
- Ceremonial county: North Yorkshire
- Region: Yorkshire and the Humber
- Country: England
- Sovereign state: United Kingdom
- Post town: SKIPTON
- Postcode district: BD23
- Police: North Yorkshire
- Fire: North Yorkshire
- Ambulance: Yorkshire

Hawkswick is a hamlet and civil parish in the county of North Yorkshire, England. Situated in the Yorkshire Dales, it lies in Littondale on the River Skirfare.

The population of the civil parish was estimated at 70 in 2012. There is a caravan park adjacent to the hamlet, south of the River Skirfare.

Hawkswick was historically a township in the ancient parish of Arncliffe, part of Staincliffe Wapentake in the West Riding of Yorkshire. Hawkswick became a separate civil parish in 1866. The parish was transferred to the new county of North Yorkshire in 1974. From 1974 to 2023 it was part of the Craven District, it is now administered by the unitary North Yorkshire Council.

== See also ==
- Listed buildings in Hawkswick
