= St John the Baptist's Church, Halton Gill =

Former church in Yorkshire, England

Coordinates: 54°11′05″N 2°11′07″W

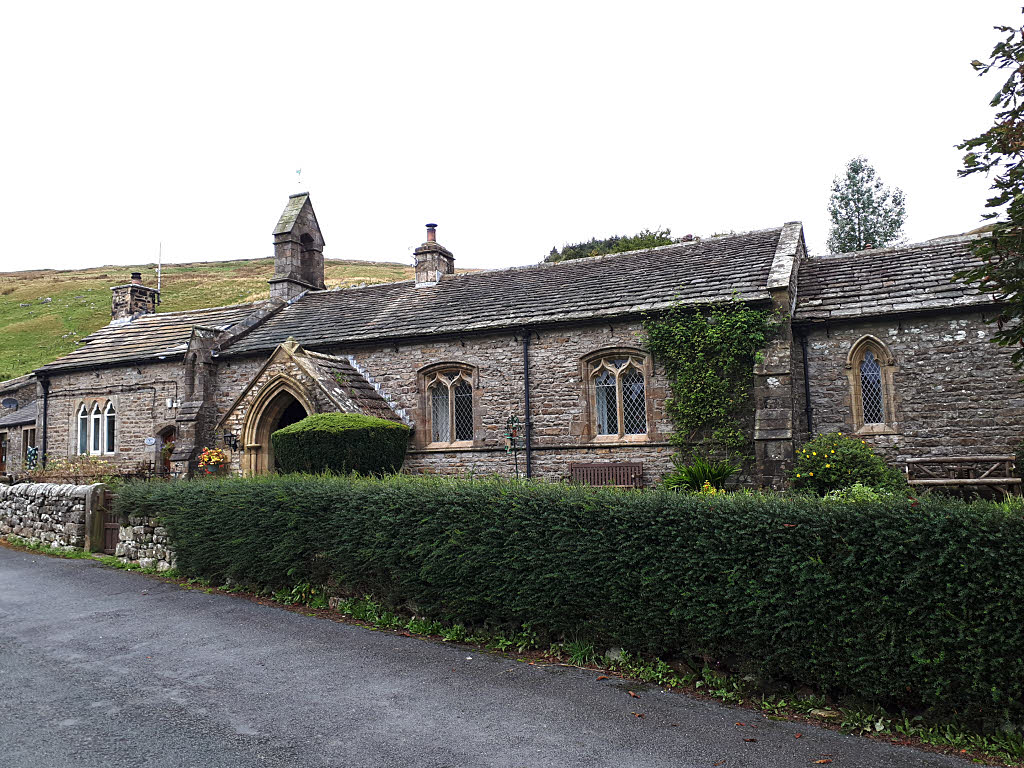
The church, in 2019

St John the Baptist's Church is a redundant church in Halton Gill, a village in North Yorkshire, in England. It has been converted into a house.

There appears to have been a church in Halton Gill by the late Mediaeval period; it was first recorded in 1577. William Fawcett left money to rebuild the church with an adjacent vicarage, and an endowment for a full-time priest provided that they also teach children during the week. The work was completed in 1626, at which time, it was a chapel of ease to St Oswald's Church, Arncliffe. A gallery was added in the 18th century. In 1848, the church was described as "a neat edifice in the later English style". The church was largely rebuilt in 1848, with only the north and west walls retained, while the vicarage was converted into a schoolroom. A dedicated schoolteacher was employed, and the church was ministered to by the priest from Arncliffe. The building was restored in 1891, with work including new foundations for the north wall, a new roof for the schoolroom, and redecoration of the church. The school closed in 1958, the same year in which the building was grade II listed. The church was redundant by 1979, and the whole building was then converted into a house.

The building is constructed of stone, with quoins, and stone slate roofs with coped gables. The former schoolhouse has one storey and one bay, and contains a doorway with a quoined surround, above which is an initialled plaque, and a window with three trefoiled lights. The former church to the right consists of a two-bay nave, a south porch, and a lower single-bay chancel, and at the west end is a bellcote.

== See also ==
- Listed buildings in Halton Gill
