= St Peter's Church, Stainforth =

Coordinates: 54.1018°N 2.2758°W

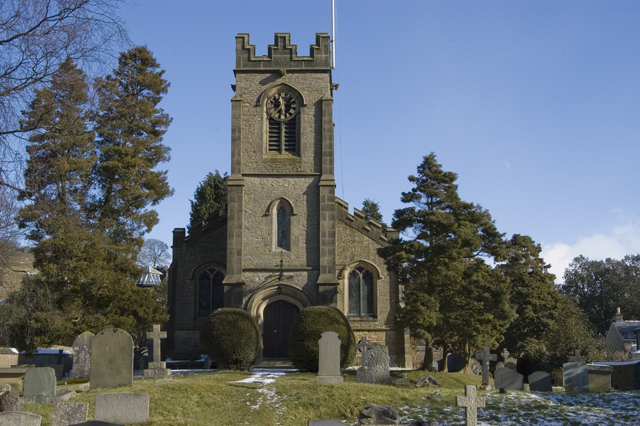
- St Peter's Church, Stainforth, from the west

- Location in North Yorkshire
- OS grid reference: SD 821,674
- Location: Stainforth, North Yorkshire
- Country: England
- Denomination: Anglican
- Website: St Peter, Stainforth

History
- Status: Parish church
- Dedication: Saint Peter
- Consecrated: 29 September 1842

Architecture
- Functional status: Active
- Heritage designation: Grade II
- Designated: 13 September 1988
- Architect: Edmund Sharpe
- Architectural type: Church
- Style: Gothic Revival
- Groundbreaking: 1839
- Completed: 1873

Specifications
- Materials: Stone, slate roofs

Administration
- Province: York
- Diocese: Leeds
- Archdeaconry: Craven
- Deanery: Bowland
- Parish: St Peter Stainforth

Clergy
- Vicar: Roger Graham Wood

St Peter's Church is in the village of Stainforth, North Yorkshire, England. It is an active Anglican parish church in the deanery of Bowland, the archdeaconry of Craven, and the Diocese of Leeds. Its benefice is united with those of St Oswald, Horton-in-Ribblesdale and St John the Evangelist, Langcliffe. The church is recorded in the National Heritage List for England as a designated Grade II listed building.

== History ==
Before this church was built, Stainforth was part of the parish of St Alkelda, Giggleswick. The church was built at the instigation of three sisters from a local gentry family, the Dawsons. It was constructed between 1839 and 1842 to a design by the Lancaster architect Edmund Sharpe. The church was consecrated by Rev Charles Longley, the Bishop of Ripon on 29 September 1842. It was "thoroughly improved" in 1873.

== Architecture ==
St Peter's is constructed in squared rubble stone with ashlar dressings and slate roofs. Its plan consists of a four-bay nave, a porch at the southeast, a lower single-bay chancel with a northeast vestry, and a west tower. The architectural style is "impeccably" Perpendicular. The tower is in three stages that are separated by string courses, and it has buttresses at the corners. The top string course is embellished with three carved heads. On the west side of the tower is a doorway, above which is a single-light window with a cinquefoil head. On each side of the top stage is a two-light bell opening with slate louvres and cinquefoil heads. The tower is surmounted by an embattled parapet with gargoyles. There are clock faces on the west and east sides. Along the wall of the nave, the bays are separated by buttresses, each of which contains a three-light window. The chancel has a four-light east window and an embattled parapet. The vestry has a chimney disguised as a turret. The stained glass in the east window and some of the other windows is by William Wailes. Above the east window is the heraldic shield of the Dawson family. The two-manual organ was made by Nicholson. There is a ring of three bells, all cast in 1842 by Thomas Mears II at Whitechapel Bell Foundry, but these are no longer ringable.

== See also ==
- Listed buildings in Stainforth, North Yorkshire
- List of architectural works by Edmund Sharpe
