= Listed buildings in Hawkswick =

Hawkswick is a civil parish in the county of North Yorkshire, England. It contains eight listed buildings that are recorded in the National Heritage List for England. All the listed buildings are designated at Grade II, the lowest of the three grades, which is applied to "buildings of national importance and special interest". The parish contains the village of Hawkswick and the surrounding area. All the listed buildings are in or near the village, and consist of houses and associated structures, farmhouses and farm buildings, and a bridge.

== Buildings ==
Name and location	Photograph	Date	Notes
Croft House; 54.13172°N 2.07153°W	—	17th century	The house is rendered and has a stone slate roof. There are two storeys and three bays. On the front are two doorways, one with a gabled hood, and the windows are recessed with chamfered mullions. Over the ground floor windows are hood moulds.
Strand House; 54.13105°N 2.06961°W	—	17th century	The house is in limestone with quoins and a stone slate roof. There are two storeys and three bays. The doorway has a pitched stone hood, and the ground floor windows have three lights and flat-faced mullions. In the upper floor is a two-light window in a recessed chamfered surround, and to the right are two inserted sash windows.
Hawkswick Bridge; 54.13005°N 2.06927°W	—	Early 18th century (probable)	The bridge carries Out Gang Lane over the River Skirfare. It is in limestone, and consists of a single wide arch with voussoirs and grooved rounded parapet coping.
Redmire Farmhouse; 54.13065°N 2.06931°W	—	Mid 18th century (probable)	The farmhouse is rendered, and has a stone slate roof, two storeys and two bays. In the centre is a gabled porch, and the windows have three lights with flat-faced mullions.
Borrings Cottage, barn and outbuilding 54.13140°N 2.07052°W		Late 18th century (probable)	The buildings are in limestone with a stone slate roof. The house has two storeys and two bays. The central doorway has a plain surround and a pitched hood, and the windows have flat-faced mullions. To the left is a projecting outbuilding containing a doorway, a square window and a letter box. Further to the left is a barn with a segmental-arch cart entrance and a square loading door above.
Thackholme; 54.13044°N 2.06874°W	—	1788	The house is in limestone, with quoins, and a stone slate roof with shaped kneelers and gable copings. There are two storeys and four bays. The windows on the front have three stepped lights and flat-faced mullions. In the right return is a doorway with an initialled and dated lintel, and at the rear is a rectangular stair window.
Hazelhead Farmhouse, gate piers and garden wall 54.13175°N 2.07194°W	—	1839	The farmhouse is in limestone, with corner pilaster strips, sill bands, moulded stone gutter brackets, and a stone slate roof with gable copings. There are two storeys, a double depth plan and three bays. The central doorway has a cornice and an initialled date plaque, and the windows are sashes in architraves. At the rear is a large round-arched stair window. The garden wall has a plinth and ridged coping, it is about 80 centimetres (31 in) high, curved and about 15 metres (49 ft) long. The piers are square, about 2 metres (6 ft 7 in) high, and each has a moulded cornice and a square acorn finial.
Coach house and stables, Hazelhead Farmhouse; 54.13156°N 2.07234°W		1840	The coach house and stables are in limestone, with rusticated quoins, paired stone gutter brackets, and a stone slate roof with shaped kneelers and gable copings. There are two storeys and three bays. The coach entrance has a rusticated segmental arch, it is flanked by doorways, and in the upper floor are square windows.
