= The Falcon Inn, Arncliffe =

Public house in North Yorkshire

The Falcon Inn
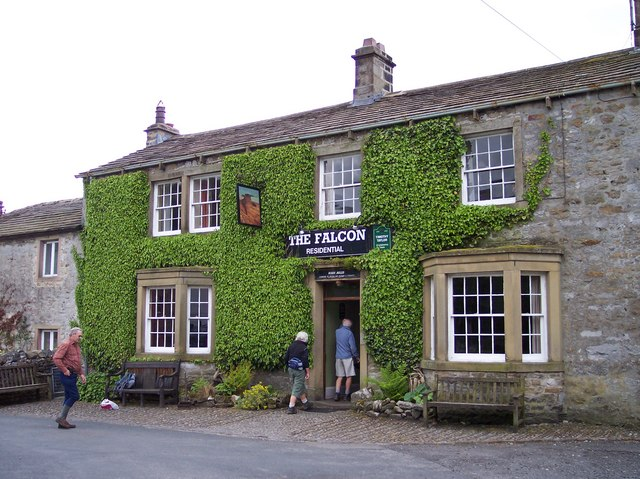
- The pub in 2009
- Interactive map of the The Falcon Inn area

General information
- Type: Public house
- Location: Monk's Road, Arncliffe, North Yorkshire, England
- Coordinates: 54.142°N 2.107°W
- Year built: 18th century (probable)
- Renovated: Early to mid-19th century (refenestrated)

Design and construction
- Designations

Listed Building – Grade II
- Official name: The Falcon public house
- Designated: 20 February 1958
- Reference no.: 1132203

The Falcon Inn is a historic public house on Monk's Road in Arncliffe, North Yorkshire, England.

The pub is thought to have been built in the 18th century, and its windows were altered in the early to mid-19th century. It was altered internally in the 1950s, when the back corridor and smoke room were merged, and a bar counter introduced, with the kitchen ceasing to act as a public room. A rear extension was added, to cater to hikers, which was rebuilt in 1975. It was Grade II listed in 1958. It is listed on the National Inventory of Historic Pub Interiors as a one-star pub.

The pub was the first to be used for external shots of The Woolpack, the pub on the soap opera Emmerdale. Some pub regulars worked as extras on the series. It also appears in the 2020 series of All Creatures Great and Small. It has been owned by the Miller family since 1874, and is unusual in serving beer directly from a jug.

The stone building has quoins and a stone slate roof. There are two storeys and three bays. The doorway has a fanlight, and a cornice on console brackets. This is flanked by canted bay windows, and the windows in the upper floor are sashes, paired on the left side.

== See also ==
- Listed buildings in Arncliffe, North Yorkshire
