= Listed buildings in Stainforth, North Yorkshire =

Stainforth is a civil parish in the county of North Yorkshire, England. It contains 24 listed buildings that are recorded in the National Heritage List for England. All the listed buildings are designated at Grade II, the lowest of the three grades, which is applied to "buildings of national importance and special interest". The parish contains the villages of Stainforth and Little Stainforth, and the surrounding countryside. Most of the listed buildings are houses, cottages and associated structures, and the others include farmhouses, a church, two bridges and four boundary stones.

== Buildings ==
Name and location	Photograph	Date	Notes
Dinsdales Cottage; 54.10037°N 2.28676°W	—	1649	A farmhouse in stone with a stone slate roof, two storeys and three bays. The doorway has a chamfered surround and a Tudor arched dated and initialled lintel. One window is a sash, and the others are casements. They have chamfered surrounds, the surrounds of those in the right bay are also moulded.
Knights Stainforth Farmhouse; 54.10096°N 2.28535°W		17th century	The farmhouse is in stone and has a stone slate roof with stone ridge coping. There are two storeys and three bays, the middle bay recessed. The doorway has a moulded surround and a hood mould, and above it is a sundial with a gnomon. The windows are mullioned, some with hood moulds, and they contain casements or sashes. Inside there is an inglenook fireplace.
Knights Stainforth Hall and Knights Cottage; 54.10039°N 2.28486°W		1672	A manor house, later divided into a house and a cottage, in stone with a stone slate roof. There are three storeys and an L-shaped plan. The front range has seven bays and moulded eaves modillions. The central doorway has a moulded surround and a large lintel, and above it is a sundial dated 1724. The windows in the lower two floors are cross windows with hood moulds, and on the top floor are two-light mullioned windows. The left return has six bays, the outer two at each end gabled. At the rear is a doorway with a chamfered surround and a pointed head.
Kern Knotts Cottage; 54.10224°N 2.27234°W	—	1684	The house is in stone with a stone slate roof, two storeys and three bays. The central doorway has a moulded surround, and a decorated initialled and dated lintel. The windows contain casements, some are mullioned and some mullions are missing.
Riston House and former stables 54.10139°N 2.27344°W	—	1684	The house and former stables, later converted into a house, are in stone with stone slate roofs, and two storeys. The house has three bays, and a central doorway with a moulded surround and a re-set decorated initialled and dated lintel. The windows are sashes with chamfered surrounds. The former stable to the right is lower with two bays. It contains a doorway with a chamfered surround and a basket-arched head, and the windows are mullioned with hood moulds. On the right bay are external steps leading to a doorway.
Burnside Farmhouse; 54.10210°N 2.27420°W	—	1697	The farmhouse is in stone, with a moulded cornice and a slate roof. There are two storeys and one bay, and the gable end faces the street. The doorway on the right has a moulded surround and a massive decorated and dated lintel. On the upper floor is a single-light window with a chamfered surround, and at the rear is a mullioned window.
Knight Stainforth Bridge; 54.10078°N 2.28011°W		c. 1700 (probable)	The bridge carries Dog Hill Brow over the River Ribble. It is in stone, and consists of a single segmental arch. The bridge is narrow, and has parapet walls.
Sherwood House Farmhouse; 54.11352°N 2.28653°W	—	1703	The farmhouse is in stone with a stone slate roof, two storeys and four bays. The doorway in the third bay has a plain surround and a gabled hood. To the right is a window, above which is a dated and initialled former doorhead in a triangular panel. The windows are mullioned and contain casements. Inside, there is a massive inglenook fireplace.
Stainforth Bridge; 54.10133°N 2.27438°W		Early 18th century (probable)	The bridge carries Main Road over Stainforth Beck, and was later widened. It is in stone, and consists of a single arch with a coped parapet.
Sherwood House Farm Cottage; 54.11334°N 2.28636°W	—	18th century	The cottage is in stone with a stone slate roof. There are two storeys, two bays, and a rear outshut under a catslide roof. In the centre is a porch and a plain doorway, and to the right is a blocked doorway. The windows are mullioned, and contain a mix of sashes, casements and fixed lights.
Brookhouse Farmhouse; 54.10177°N 2.27349°W	—	Late 18th century	The farmhouse is in pebbledashed stone, with shaped eaves modillions, and a Welsh slate roof with terracotta ridge coping. There are two storeys and three bays. The doorway has a moulded architrave and a cornice. The windows are mullioned, with sashes on the ground floor and casements above.
Brookside; 54.10180°N 2.27371°W	—	Late 18th century	The farmhouse is in pebbledashed stone with a stone slate roof. There are two storeys and three bays. On the front is a porch, above it is a single-light window, and the other windows are mullioned, with sashes and casements.
Town Head House; 54.10272°N 2.27374°W	—	Late 18th to early 19th century	The house is in stone on a plinth, with quoins, a modillion eaves cornice, and a slate roof with gable coping. There are two storeys, and three bays, and the gable end faces the street. The central doorway has engaged Roman Doric columns, a triglyph and metope frieze and an open pediment with a fanlight in the tympanum, and the windows are sashes. In the garden is a dated sundial base with an octagonal shaft.
Vicarage; 54.10184°N 2.27449°W	—	Late 18th to early 19th century	The vicarage is in stone, with eaves modillions and a stone slate roof. There are two storeys and three bays. The central doorway has Tuscan pilasters, a semicircular fanlight and an open pediment. It is flanked by canted bay windows, and on the upper floor are sash windows.
Boundary stone at SD8152566603; 54.09501°N 2.28400°W		Early 19th century	The boundary stone on the west side of Stainforth Lane is a slate slab about 1 metre (3 ft 3 in) in height, with a pointed top. It is divided by a vertical groove, and inscribed "GIGGLESWICK" "STAINFORTH".
Boundary stone at SD8097969455; 54.12063°N 2.29256°W	—	Early 19th century	The boundary stone 150 metres southwest of Helwith Bridge is a slate slab about 45 centimetres (18 in) in height. The upper surface is angled from top right to bottom left, and the stone is inscribed "STAINFORTH".
Boundary stone at SD8079969175; 54.11831°N 2.29495°W	—	Early 19th century	The boundary stone 150 metres west of Sunny Bank Barn is a slate slab about 35 centimetres (14 in) in height. The upper surface is angled from top right to bottom left, and the stone is inscribed "STAINFORTH" on the front and the rear.
Boundary stone at SD8322166821; 54.09706°N 2.25824°W		Early 19th century	The boundary stone 250m south of Cattrigg Force is a slate slab about 22 centimetres (8.7 in) in height. The upper surface is angled from top left to bottom right, and the stone is inscribed "LANGCLIFFE".
Ribblesdale House; 54.10252°N 2.27511°W	—	Early 19th century	The house is in stone, with eaves modillions, and a stone slate roof with gable coping on the right. There are two storeys and four bays. The doorway has a moulded surround, a rectangular fanlight, and an open pedimented hood on moulded consoles, and the windows are sashes.
Stock Hill House and Barn; 54.10254°N 2.27474°W	—	Early 19th century	The house and a barn later converted into a house, in stone with stone slate roofs. The house has two storeys and attics and three bays, shaped eaves modillions, and the gable end faces the street. On the front is a porch with a rusticated surround, chamfered jambs and a hipped roof. The windows are sashes in projecting plain surrounds, and on the attics are three gabled dormers with casements. The barn to the right is lower, with two storeys, and contains a doorway with a chamfered surround and a dated and initialled lintel, and a mullioned window.
Neals Ing Farmhouse; 54.11709°N 2.24491°W		c. 1835	The house, designed by George Webster, is in stone, and has a stone slate roof with coped gables, finials and pendants. There are two storeys and three bays, the central bay recessed, and the outer bays gabled, and flanked by single-storey bays. In the centre is a projecting porch with a Tudor arch, and a cornice and a hood mould with two shields between them. The windows are mullioned and transomed with hood moulds.
St Peter's Church; 54.10184°N 2.27588°W		1839–41	The church, designed by Edmund Sharpe, is in stone with a slate roof. and is in Perpendicular style. It consists of a ave, a southeast porch, a chancel, a northeast vestry and a west tower. The tower has three stages, string courses, stepped clasping buttresses, and a west doorway with a pointed head, a moulded architrave and a hood mould, above which is a single light. The bell openings have two lights with cinquefoil heads, on the east front is a clock face, and the parapet is embattled and has gargoyles. There are also embattled parapets on the body of the church.
Stainforth House; 54.10220°N 2.27507°W		1840s	The house, later used for other purposes, is in stone, with Tuscan quoin strips, a pilaster, projecting eaves with paired brackets, and a hipped slate roof. There are two storeys and four bays. The third bay projects slightly and contains a porch with pilasters and a Tuscan entablature. The windows are sashes with moulded surrounds. On the right return is a two-storey canted bay window, and a projecting wing , the upper floor containing a billiard room with a partly glazed hipped roof.
Taitlands, wall and gate piers 54.09721°N 2.27543°W		1840s	The house, later used for other purposes, is in stone, with a sill band, panelled angle pilasters, eaves modillions, and a hipped slate roof. There are two storeys and three bays. The middle bay projects slightly, and has a rusticated ground floor and banded rustication above. On it is a portico with four fluted Ionic columns and a cast iron balcony, and two doors with a rectangular fanlight and imitation rusticated voussoirs. The windows are sashes with moulded sills. To the right is a recessed two-storey two-bay wing. The two entrances to the grounds are flanked by gate piers with pyramidal caps, and stone walls with posts at the ends.
