= Listed buildings in Arncliffe, North Yorkshire =

Arncliffe is a civil parish in the county of North Yorkshire, England. It contains 29 listed buildings that are recorded in the National Heritage List for England. All the listed buildings are designated at Grade II, the lowest of the three grades, which is applied to "buildings of national importance and special interest". The parish contains the village of Arncliffe and the surrounding area, and all the listed buildings are in the village. Most of these are houses, cottages, farmhouses and farm buildings, and the others include a church, its former vicarage, a former mill and associated structures, two bridges, a public house, a pump housing and trough, and a telephone kiosk.

== Buildings ==
Name and location	Photograph	Date	Notes
St Oswald's Church; 54.14368°N 2.10382°W		15th century	The church has been altered and extended through the centuries. The oldest part is the tower, the body of the church was rebuilt in 1796, and alterations were made in 1841 by Anthony Salvin. The church is built in limestone with a grey slate roof, and consists of a nave, a north aisle, a south porch, a lower chancel, and a west tower. The tower has two stages, diagonal buttresses, a Perpendicular west window, a clock face on the south front, two-light bell openings with trefoil heads under a continuous hood mould, and an embattled parapet with crocketed corner pinnacles.
Old Cote; 54.14569°N 2.10875°W		1650	The house is in limestone with quoins and a stone slate roof. There are two storeys and four bays, and a later bay added on the right. On the front is a two-storey gabled porch containing a doorway with a chamfered quoined surround, and a four-centred arched head, and above it are two plaques with initials and the date. All the windows are recessed, chamfered and mullioned, those in the upper floor of the porch with three stepped lights, and those in the ground floor with hood moulds. In the left angle of the porch is a stair turret.
Green Cottage; 54.14275°N 2.10763°W	—	17th century	A stone house with quoins, and a stone slate roof with a ball finial on the gable. There are two storeys and two bays, the right bay projecting as an outshut. In the left bay is a lean-to porch, and in the left return are three-light chamfered mullioned windows, with a hood mould in the ground floor.
Post Office Cottage; 54.14216°N 2.10499°W		17th century	The house, at one time a post office, is in limestone with a stone slate roof. There are two storeys, three bays, and a projecting outshut bay on the left. On the front is a trellised porch, to its left is a two-light mullioned window, and the other windows are sashes in plain surrounds.
Rose Cottage; 54.14254°N 2.10655°W		17th century (probable)	The house and outbuilding are in stone, with quoins and a stone slate roof. There are two storeys, the house has two bays, with an added bay on the left, and a two-bay outbuilding on the right. On the house is a gabled porch, the windows are pivoting casements in chamfered surrounds, and in the left bay are garage doors. The outbuilding has been converted for residential use, and has a doorway and two-light windows.
Barn southeast of Lane Top Farmhouse; 54.14222°N 2.10527°W		1677	The barn, which was later extended, is in limestone with a stone slate roof. There are two storeys and three bays, and a later two-bay extension to the left. In the original part is a central cart entrance under a porch, and to its left is a doorway with chamfered long and short quoins, above which is a dated plaque and a square opening with a chamfered surround. In the extension are two doorways, one with quoined jambs.
Bridge over Cowside Beck; 54.14325°N 2.10817°W		17th to early 18th century	The bridge carries a road over the stream. It is in stone, and consists of a single arch that is slightly hump-backed. The bridge has a parapet with rounded stone coping.
Outbuilding west of Carr Farmhouse; 54.14195°N 2.10480°W	—	1723	The outbuilding is in stone with quoins and a stone slate roof. There are two storeys and two bays. On the left is a doorway with quoined jambs and a projecting lintel. To the right is a three-light mullioned window, above which is a loading window with a recessed chamfered surround, and between them is a square plaque with a moulded frame containing the date in raised lettering.
Green Farmhouse; 54.14281°N 2.10732°W	—	1730	The farmhouse is in stone with quoins and a stone slate roof. There are two storeys and five bays. The doorway to the left has an initialled and dated lintel, and hood of two pitched slabs. The windows have mullions, and some also have transoms.
High Green Cottage; 54.14219°N 2.10720°W	—	Early to mid 18th century	The house is in whitewashed stone and has a stone slate roof. There are two storeys and two bays, and an outshut on the right. On the front are two doorways, the right one in the outshut and recessed, and the windows are mullioned with casements.
Lane Top Farmhouse; 54.14233°N 2.10545°W	—	1736	The farmhouse is in rendered stone, and has a stone slate roof with coped gables and shaped kneelers. There are two storeys and two bays. The central doorway has an eared architrave and a segmental pediment containing initials and the date. The windows are tripartite sashes.
Lane Top Cottage; 54.14234°N 2.10573°W		18th century	The house is in stone with quoins and a stone slate roof. There are two storeys and two bays. The doorway has a plain surround and a three-light fanlight above the lintel, and the windows are sashes.
Mill Gate; 54.14297°N 2.10834°W		18th century	A mill weighing house, later a private house, it is in stone with quoins, and a stone slate roof with coped gables and shaped kneelers. There are two storeys and two bays. On the front and rear are blocked cart arches. The one on the front has a quoined surround and voussoirs, and a doorway with a fanlight has been inserted, and to the right are two-light windows.
Plane Tree Cottage; 54.14212°N 2.10485°W	—	18th century (probable)	The house is in limestone, with quoins on the right, and a grey slate roof. There are two storeys and three bays. The doorway and the windows, which date from the 20th century and are small-paned, have plain surrounds.
The Falcon Public House; 54.14203°N 2.10692°W		18th century (probable)	The public house is in stone with quoins and a stone slate roof. There are two storeys and three bays. The doorway has a fanlight, and a cornice on console brackets. This is flanked by canted bay windows, and the windows in the upper floor are sashes, paired on the left side.
The Mill; 54.14269°N 2.10870°W		18th century	A corn mill, later a cotton mill, subsequently converted for residential use, it is in rendered stone, with quoins, plain gutter brackets and a stone slate roof. There are two storeys and nine bays. The doorway and the windows, which are 20th-century two-light casements, have plain surrounds.
Arncliffe Bridge; 54.14351°N 2.10515°W		Mid to late 18th century	The bridge carries Gooselands Hill over the River Skirfare. It is in stone, and consists of three segmental arches. The pointed cutwaters rise as pilasters to the level of the parapet, there is a projecting band at the level of the road, and the parapet has slightly gabled projecting coping.
Barn southwest of Carr Farmhouse; 54.14179°N 2.10477°W	—	Mid to late 18th century (probable)	The barn is in stone with quoins and a stone slate roof. There is a single storey, four bays, a rear outshut, and an outshut on the left. In the left bay are through stones, the second bay has a porch with an entrance under an outshut roof, and on the fourth bay is a gabled extension with two low doorways.
Castle Farmhouse; 54.14180°N 2.10572°W	—	Mid to late 18th century	A stone farmhouse with a stone slate roof, two storeys and four bays. The doorway has a chamfered surround, to its right is a three-light mullioned window, and the other windows are sashes.
The Old Vicarage; 54.14317°N 2.10325°W	—	1770 (probable)	The vicarage, which was extended in 1836 and later divided into two private houses, is in stone with chamfered quoins, a sill band, and a stone slate roof. There are two storeys, three bays, and an added bay projecting on the right. The middle bay of the original part contains a round-headed window with a keystone in each floor, and the outer bays contain a Venetian window in each floor, the ground floor windows with Tuscan columns. Under the middle upper floor window is an inscribed and dated panel. At the rear are five bays and sash windows in architraves. In the right return is a door in a recessed porch with Tuscan columns, an entablature and a cornice.
Carr Farmhouse; 54.14195°N 2.10457°W	—	Late 18th century (probable)	The farmhouse is in stone with quoins, shaped gutter brackets, and a stone slate roof with coped gables and shaped kneelers. There are two storeys and three bays. The central doorway has an architrave and a cornice, and the windows are sashes with plain surrounds, most with mullions.
Low Ryelands Farmhouse; 54.14238°N 2.10586°W		Late 18th century	A house in limestone, with quoins and a stone slate roof. There are two storeys and four bays. The doorway has a plain surround and a cornice, and the windows are sashes in plain surrounds.
1 and 2 Castle Yard; 54.14191°N 2.10626°W	—	Late 18th to early 19th century	A pair of stone houses with a stone slate roof, two storeys and five bays. On the front are two doorways, the windows are sashes, and all the openings have plain surrounds.
Elm House; 54.14174°N 2.10525°W		Early 19th century	The house is in stone with raised quoins and a stone slate roof with gable copings. There are two storeys and three bays. The central doorway has a pitched slab hood on stone brackets, and the windows are sashes with slightly projecting surrounds.
The Mill House; 54.14281°N 2.10836°W	—	Early to mid 19th century	An office and stores, later a house, it is in stone with quoins and a stone slate roof. There are two storeys and six bays. The main doorway has a plain surround, a fanlight and a cornice, there is a smaller doorway, and most of the windows are sashes with plain surrounds.
Prospect House; 54.14245°N 2.10721°W	—	Mid 19th century	The house is in gritstone, with long and short quoins, a sill band, gutter brackets and a stone slate roof. There are two storeys and three bays. The central doorway has a plain surround and a cornice, and the windows are sashes with plain surrounds.
Pump housing and trough 54.14216°N 2.10608°W		Mid to late 19th century	The pump housing is in gritstone blocks, it is about 2 metres (6 ft 7 in) high, and has recesses for the handle and spout, both of which are missing. The cover stone is gabled, and has roll moulding, and trefoil recesses in the gable ends. The trough is in solid gritstone, and has an overflow channel on the north side.
High Ryelands; 54.14251°N 2.10617°W	—	1871	A house and outbuilding in stone, with moulded gutter brackets, stone slate roofs, and two storeys, The house has three bays, a central doorway with a segmental-arched head, imposts, a cornice and an internal porch. The windows are sashes, those in the ground floor tripartite. The lower outbuilding, recessed on the right, has two bays, and it contains a segmental carriage arch with a dated keystone, to the left is a doorway with a quoined surround, and the windows are small.
Telephone kiosk 54.14215°N 2.10512°W		1935	The K6 type telephone kiosk in front of the former post office was designed by Giles Gilbert Scott. Constructed in cast iron with a square plan and a dome, it has three unperforated crowns in the top panels.
