= Littondale =

Dale in the former Craven District of North Yorkshire, England

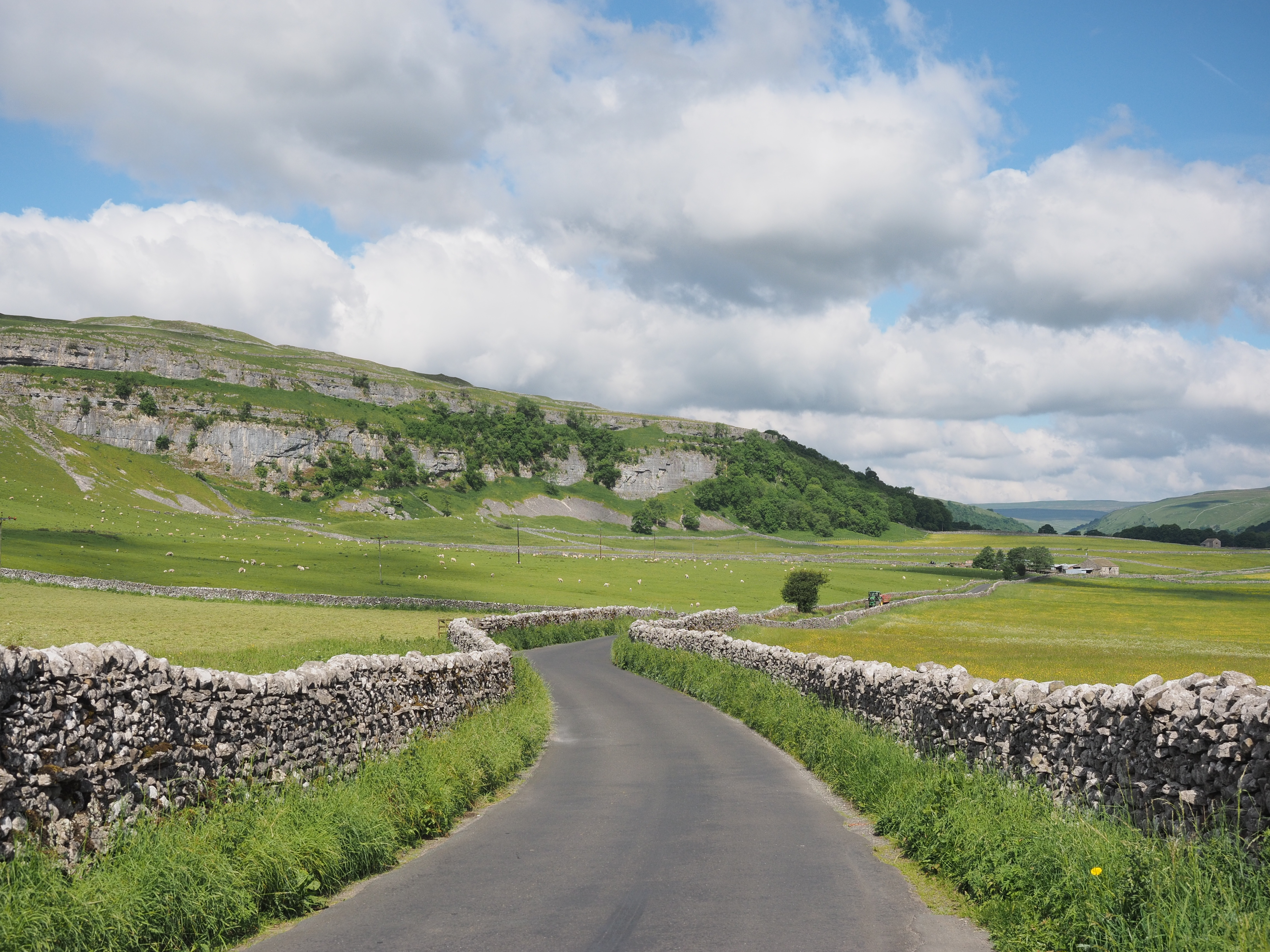
Littondale, toward Arncliffe

Littondale is a dale in the non-metropolitan county of North Yorkshire, England. It comprises the main settlements of Hawkswick, Arncliffe, Litton, Foxup and Halton Gill, and farmhouses that date from the 17th century. The main waterway in the dale is the River Skirfare which is fed by many small gills and becks.

The dale, first recorded by name as Littundale in 1198, is one of the few dales named from its main settlement rather than its river (Wensleydale is the best known example). Historically the dale was also known as Amerdale. The village of Arncliffe was the original setting for the TV series Emmerdale, which is believed to take its name from Amerdale.

== Geography ==
Littondale is a side dale to the west of Wharfedale and follows the River Skirfare. The nature of the dale and its characteristic smooth form was the result of many ice ages, especially the one 20,000 years ago. As the glacier for that age receded it left retreat moraine, an example of which can be found at Skirfare Bridge. Like neighbouring Wharfedale, Littondale comprises mainly Great Scar Limestone and Yoredale rock. The dale has a number of shake holes and sink-holes that lead to cave systems such as at Boreham Cave. At the head of the dale is Pen-y-ghent, one of the Yorkshire Three Peaks.

A narrow road leads up the dale from the B6160 near Kilnsey as far as Foxup. Two minor roads lead out of the dale to the south and west, one from Arncliffe to Malham and one from Halton Gill past Pen-y-Ghent to Stainforth in Ribblesdale. Littondale is home to Scoska Wood National Nature Reserve.

== History ==
Littondale is rich in Bronze Age and Iron Age settlements, and has been a sheltered fertile valley for 5,000 years or more. Anglian cultivation terraces (lynchets) can be seen in the valley. After the Conquest, the Normans turned it into a hunting chase before the land was granted to the monks of Fountains Abbey in the 13th century, and became extensively used for sheep farming.

All of Littondale was historically in the ancient parish of Arncliffe in the West Riding of Yorkshire. In 1866 it was divided into the civil parishes of Hawkswick, Arncliffe, Litton and Halton Gill, and in 1974 became part of the new county of North Yorkshire. From 1974 to 2023 it was part of the Craven District, it is now administered by the unitary North Yorkshire Council.

== Settlements ==
Hawkswick is the first settlement reached travelling from the B6160. The name is derived from the Middle English Hauk meaning someone who trained Hawks and wick, meaning dairy farm.

Arncliffe is the second, and largest, settlement reached travelling from the B6160, lies at the confluence of Cowside Beck and the River Skirfare. The name derives from the Old English, earna-clif, meaning eagles cliff. It is now a conservation area and is centred on its village green and has one public house. The church was built in the 16th and 18th centuries to replace the stone 11th century building, which probably superseded a wooden Anglo-Saxon church.

Litton is the third settlement reached travelling from the B6160. The name has the meaning village on a roaring stream.

Halton Gill is the fourth settlement reached travelling from the B6160. The name is derived from the Anglo-Saxon haugh meaning Valley and tun meaning farm. Gill is a derivation of the Olde Norse 'gil', meaning ravine, therefore the whole name means valley farm by the ravine.

Foxup is the last settlement reached travelling from the B6160. The name means fox valley.

== Governance ==
Littondale lies within the Mid Craven electoral division of North Yorkshire County Council. The county councillor in 2020 is Gill Quinn of the Conservative Party.

Littondale lies within the Craven District Council ward of Upper Wharfedale and as of 2020 is represented by Sue Metcalfe of the Conservative Party.

There are four civil parishes in Littondale. Arncliffe has a parish council. Hawkswick, Litton and Halton Gill have parish meetings but no parish councils.

== Gallery ==
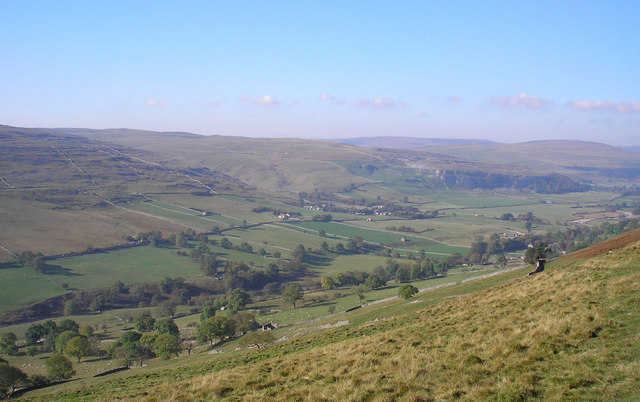
Littondale. Seen from above Hawkswick on the path from Kettlewell.

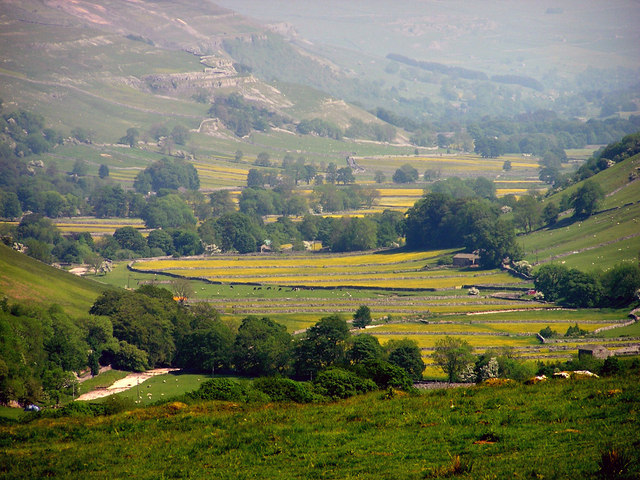
View down Littondale

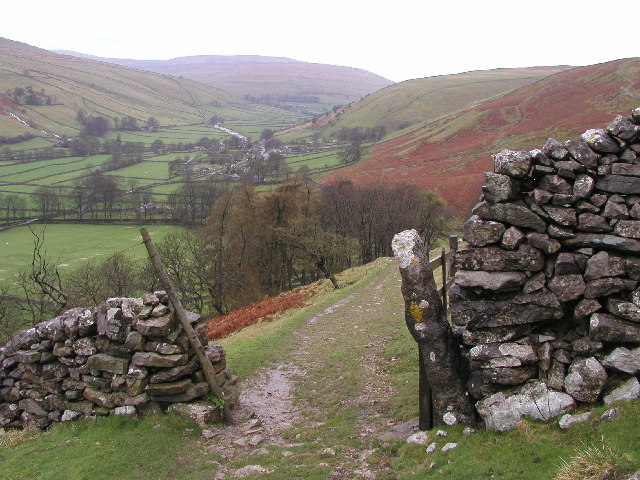
View up Littondale. Looking north-westwards from footpath corner at MR: SD916739.

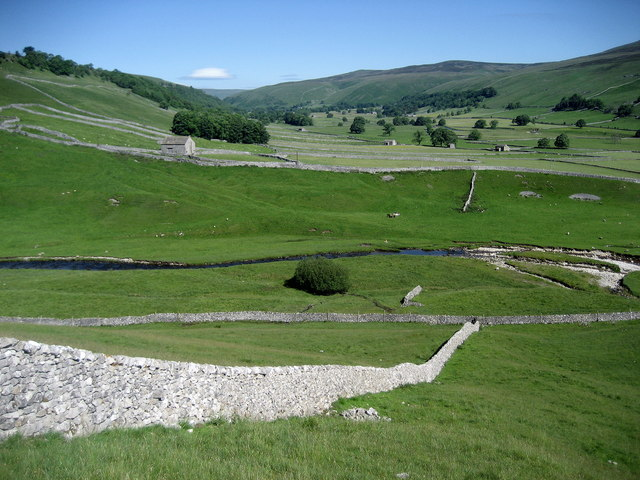
View up Littondale. Looking up dale from the Monks Road in a north-westerly direction.

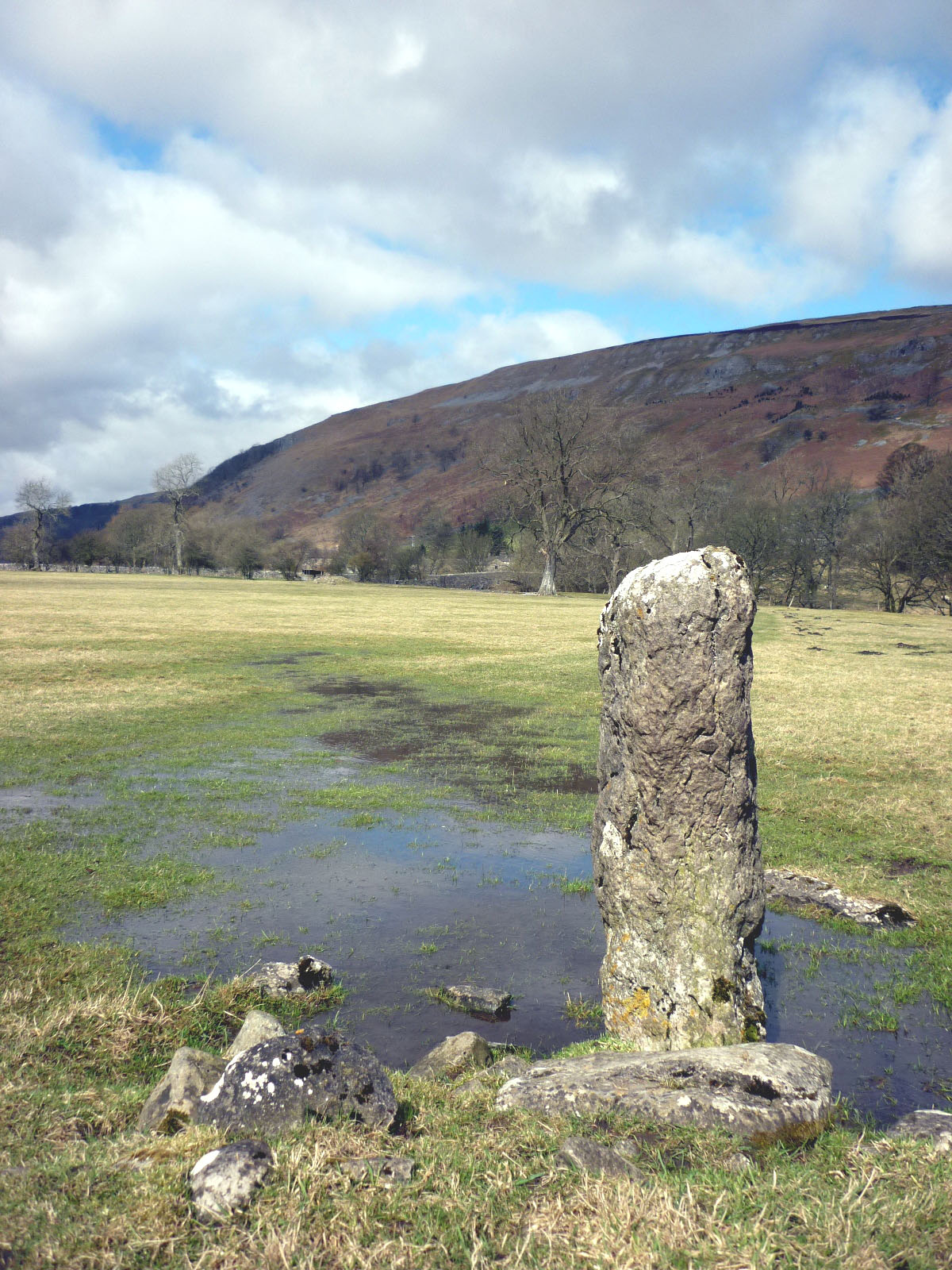
Stone pillar, Littondale near Hawkswick Bridge.

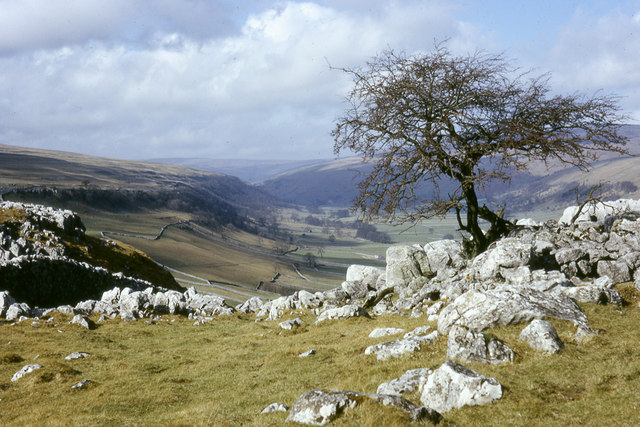
Littondale (North Yorkshire). View from near the Hawkswick to Malham footpath.

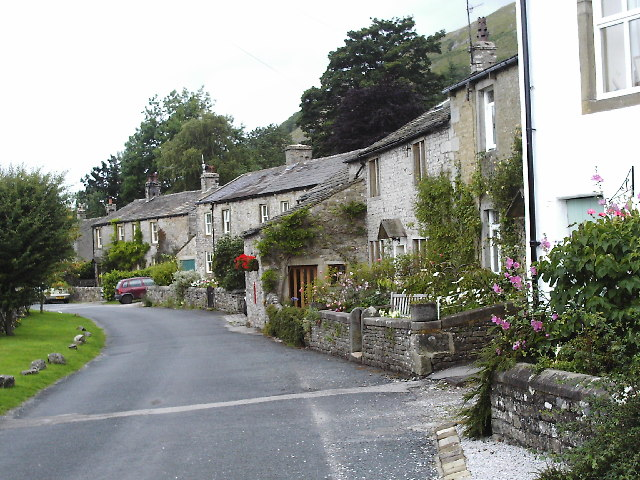
Hawkswick

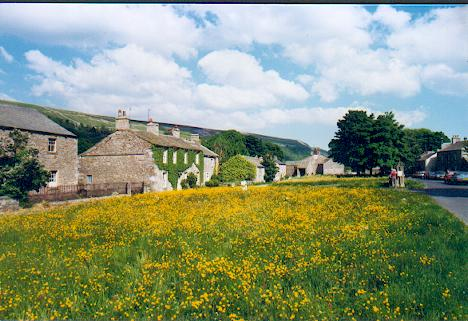
Arncliffe

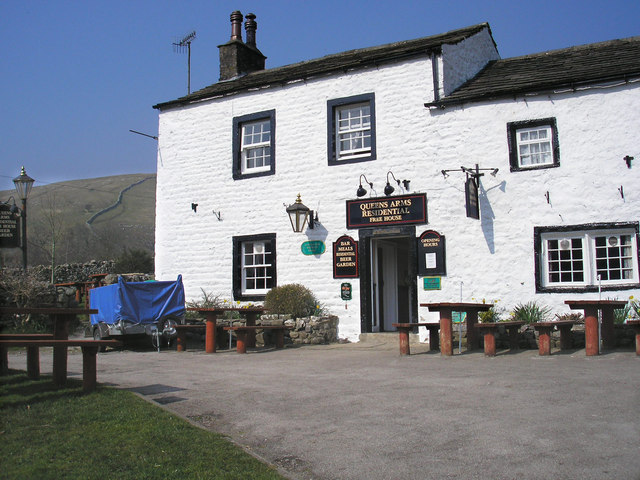
The Queen's Arms, Litton

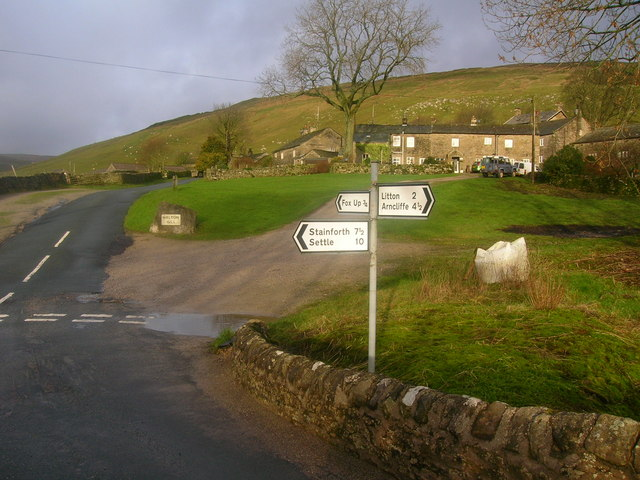
Halton Gill

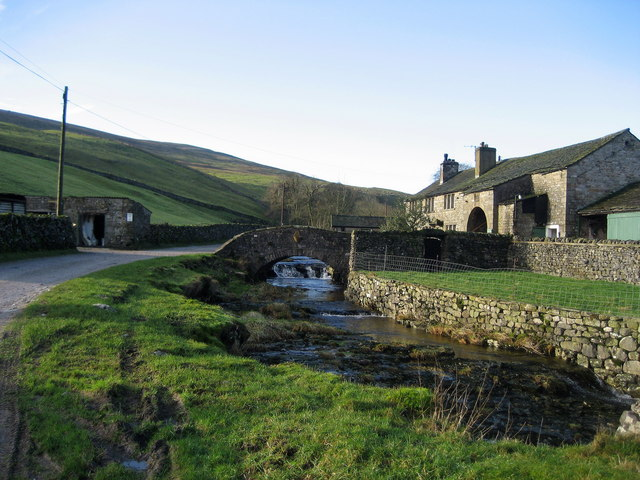
Foxup
