= Listed buildings in Halton Gill =

Halton Gill is a civil parish in the county of North Yorkshire, England. It contains 13 listed buildings that are recorded in the National Heritage List for England. All the listed buildings are designated at Grade II, the lowest of the three grades, which is applied to "buildings of national importance and special interest". The parish contains the village of Halton Gill and the surrounding countryside and moorland. Most of the listed buildings consist of houses, cottages, farmhouses and farm buildings, and the others include a schoolhouse and a church converted into a house, a bridge, two boundary stones, and a telephone kiosk.

== Buildings ==
Name and location	Photograph	Date	Notes
Former schoolhouse and church 54.18477°N 2.185300°W		1626	The oldest part is the schoolhouse, the attached church was largely rebuilt in 1848, and the building has been converted into a house. It is in stone, with quoins, and stone slate roofs with coped gables. The former schoolhouse has one storey and one bay, and contains a doorway with a quoined surround, above which is an initialled plaque, and a window with three trefoiled lights. The former church to the right consists of a two-bay nave, a south porch, and a lower single-bay chancel, and at the west end is a bellcote.
Low House; 54.18440°N 2.18466°W	—	1626	The house is in stone with quoins and a stone slate roof. There are two storeys and two bays, and an added bay to the left. The doorway to the right has a chamfered surround, and above it is a stone plaque with a recessed dated and initialled panel. In the earlier part are mullioned windows, and both parts contain square windows.
Manor House; 54.18499°N 2.18502°W	—	1641	The house is in stone, with quoins, stone gutter brackets, and a stone slate roof with shaped kneelers and coped gables. There are two storeys, a main range of four bays, and a parallel two-bay range at the rear. On the front is a projecting porch bay containing a doorway with a pointed arch and a hood mould, above which is a re-set datestone. The windows are chamfered and mullioned with hood moulds. At the rear is a central doorway with a plain surround, and a sash window.
Wrathmire Farmhouse; 54.18472°N 2.18464°W		17th century	A house and a cottage, later combined, in gritstone with quoins and a stone slate roof. There are two storeys, three bays, and an added cottage bay to the right. On the front is a doorway with chamfered quoined jambs and a plain lintel. The windows are recessed, chamfered and mullioned, and the ground floor openings are under a continuous stepped hood mould. In the cottage bay is a doorway with a quoined surround.
Outbuilding northwest of Manor House; 54.18516°N 2.18553°W	—	1652	A farmhouse later extended and converted into an outbuilding, it is in gritstone with quoins and a stone slate roof. There are two storeys, two original bays, an added bay to the left, and two bays to the right. In the original part is a blocked doorway converted into a window, with chamfered quoined jambs, and a cambered lintel with inscribed and dated recessed panels, and mullioned windows. The left bay contains a cambered arch with quoined jambs, and in the right two bays are a stable door and a carriage entrance.
Bargh House; 54.18429°N 2.18386°W	—	1658	A farmhouse that was extended probably in the 19th century, in limestone with quoins, stone gutter brackets and a stone slate roof. There are two storeys, two bays, and a two-bay extension to the right. In the original part is a later porch, and a doorway with a chamfered quoined surround and a large dated and initialled lintel. The windows are recessed, chamfered and mullioned with hood moulds.
Outbuilding at High Foxup; 54.18609°N 2.20232°W	—	1673	The house, later used for other purposes, is in gritstone with a stone slate roof. There is one storey and an attic, and three bays. The central projecting porch has a blocked doorway in the right return, with quoined jambs, and a large lintel with a recessed initialled and dated panel, and there are two inserted doorways. The windows are recessed, chamfered and mullioned, with some mullions missing. At the rear is a semicircular stair turret containing a pierced stone circular window, and three narrow chamfered windows..
Foxup Bridge; 54.18620°N 2.19826°W		Late 17th century (probable)	The bridge carries a track over Foxup Beck. It is in gritstone, and consists of a single slightly hump-backed arch. The parapet was rebuilt in 1987.
Nether Heselden; 54.16723°N 2.17441°W	—	1703	A farmhouse in gritstone, with quoins, and a stone slate roof with shaped kneelers and coped gables. There are two storeys and four bays. The main doorway has plain jambs, an entablature and a moulded cornice, and to the left is a service door., Above the main doorway is a dated and initialled plaque. In the right return is a doorway with chamfered quoined jambs, and a lintel with two inscribed plaques. To the left of the main doorway is a four-light mullioned window, and at the rear are more mullioned windows and a narrow stair window; the other windows are later replacements.
Angram Farmhouse; 54.18460°N 2.18426°W	—	Mid 18th century	A farmhouse and barn in gritstone, with quoins, and a stone slate roof with gable copings and kneelers. There are two storeys, and the house has two bays. The central doorway has straight jamb stones and a large lintel, and the windows are mullioned. The barn has two bays, and contains a cart entrance with a cambered arch, quoined jambs and windows.
Boundary stone (northwest); 54.14229°N 2.25384°W		Late 18th to early 19th century	The parish boundary stone consists of a slate slab about 50 centimetres (20 in) high and 40 centimetres (16 in) wide. It has a basket arched top, and is inscribed "ARNCLIFFE".
Boundary stone (west); 54.14219°N 2.25391°W		Early 19th century	The parish boundary stone consists of a slate slab about 65 centimetres (26 in) high. The upper surface is angled from top right to bottom left, and it is inscribed "STAINFORTH".
Telephone kiosk 54.18452°N 2.18508°W		1935	The K6 type telephone kiosk was designed by Giles Gilbert Scott. Constructed in cast iron with a square plan and a dome, it has three unperforated crowns in the top panels.
