= Stainforth Force =

Waterfall in North Yorkshire, England

Stainforth Force Stainforth Foss Ribble Falls
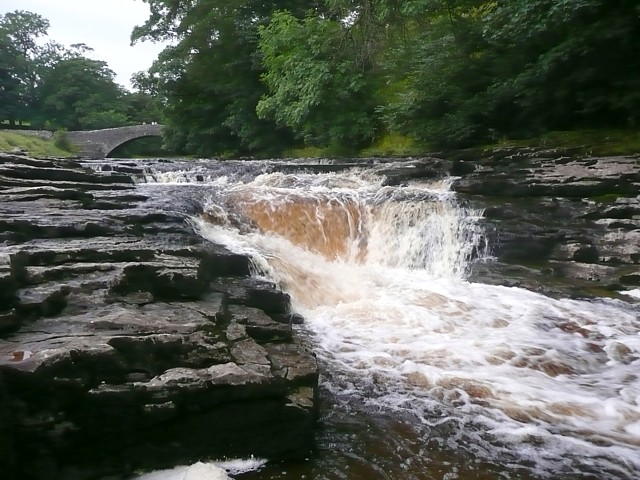
- Stainforth Force
- Interactive map of Stainforth Force; Stainforth Foss; Ribble Falls
- Location: Stainforth, North Yorkshire, England
- Coordinates: 54.100°N 2.279°W
- Type: Cascade
- Total height: 2.5 metres (8 ft 2 in)
- Watercourse: River Ribble

Stainforth Force (also known as Stainforth Foss and Ribble Falls), is a 2.5-metre (8 ft 2 in) high cascade waterfall on the River Ribble at Stainforth, 3 miles (5 km) north of Settle in North Yorkshire, England. The waterfall is a popular tourist attraction in autumn when Atlantic salmon are migrating up the river.

== Description ==
Stainforth Force is a small cascade waterfall located near to the village of Stainforth, about 50 yards (46 m) south of Stainforth Bridge, and some 3 miles (5 km) north of Settle, in North Yorkshire. The partially eroded rock that the water travels over here is the Chapel House Limestone, which has been exposed by a small anticline. However, to make the way for migrating salmon easier, the Yorkshire Dales National Park carved the rock "..in an inconspicuous way.."

In autumn the spot is a popular tourist attraction on account of the Atlantic salmon leaping up the falls to reach the spawning grounds upriver. The plunge pool below the last fall, described as being "..a dark, [and] sinister-looking pool..", is popular with wild swimmers, and the site is also a popular stopping point on the Ribble Way. The site was also said to have been a favoured location of Edward Elgar, who visited his friend Dr Buck who was living in Settle at the time. A picture of Elgar standing on the bridge is said to have been up on Elgar's wall at his house.

== See also ==
- List of waterfalls
- List of waterfalls in England
