= Arncliffe, North Yorkshire =

Village and civil parish in North Yorkshire, England

Coordinates: 54°08′32″N 2°06′23″W

Arncliffe
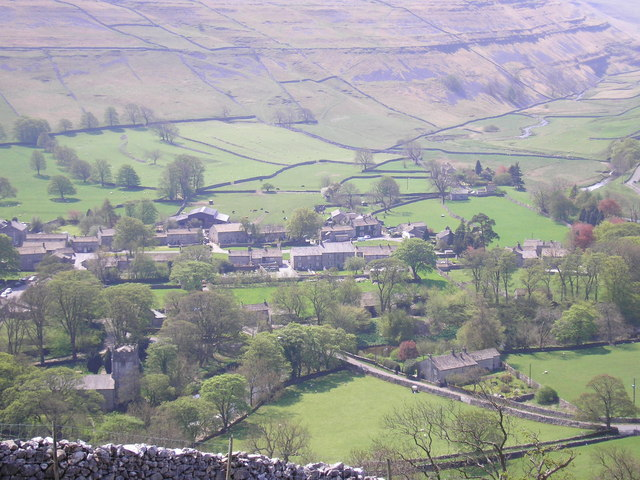
- Arncliffe and Littondale from the north

- Location within North Yorkshire
- Population: 80 (NYCC estimate) 2018
- OS grid reference: SD931718
- Unitary authority: North Yorkshire
- Ceremonial county: North Yorkshire
- Region: Yorkshire and the Humber
- Country: England
- Sovereign state: United Kingdom
- Post town: SKIPTON
- Postcode district: BD23
- Dialling code: 01756
- Police: North Yorkshire
- Fire: North Yorkshire
- Ambulance: Yorkshire
- UK Parliament: Skipton and Ripon

Arncliffe is a small village and civil parish in Littondale, one of the Yorkshire Dales in the county of North Yorkshire, England. Littondale is a small valley beside Upper Wharfedale, 3 miles (4.8 km) beyond Kilnsey and its famous crag. The population of the civil parish was estimated at 80 in 2015.

== Overview ==
Situated on a gravel delta above the flood-plain of the River Skirfare, Arncliffe's houses, cottages, and other buildings face a large green, and green hillsides etched with limestone scars. A barn to the north of the green is a good example of the local style, with an unusual entrance, and a datestone of 1677.

Behind the village buildings are several small crofts, nearly one to each house, and beyond these, limestone walls climb the surrounding hills separating higher fields. St Oswald's Church lies close to the river a little north of the village, and the road up the dale crosses the river past Bridge End where Charles Kingsley stayed, and Old Cotes, built in 1650, whose gabled porch has a 3-light window somewhat characteristic of late 17th century houses in this area of the dales. A narrow, winding road climbs steeply southwards from the village, across the fells towards Malham. Paths also go towards Kettlewell and Starbotton.

Arncliffe was the original setting for the fictional village of Beckindale in the ITV soap opera Emmerdale Farm, from its inception in 1972 until moving to Esholt in 1976. Some scenes for the 2020 TV series All Creatures Great and Small were filmed in Arncliffe. The village pub, The Falcon Inn, has appeared in both shows.

The village is the birthplace of nuclear scientist and Up Series participant Nicholas Hitchon.

== History ==
Arncliffe was first mentioned in the Domesday Book of 1086. The toponym is of Old English origin, meaning "eagles' cliff" (from earn "eagle").

The ancient parish of Arncliffe was part of Staincliffe Wapentake in the West Riding of Yorkshire. The parish also included the townships of Hawkswick, Litton, Halton Gill and Buckden. All these places became separate civil parishes in 1866.

From 1974 to 2023 it was part of the Craven District, it is now administered by the unitary North Yorkshire Council.

== See also ==
- Listed buildings in Arncliffe, North Yorkshire
