= St Oswald's Church, Arncliffe =

Church in Arncliffe, North Yorkshire, England

Coordinates: 54°08′37″N 2°06′14″W

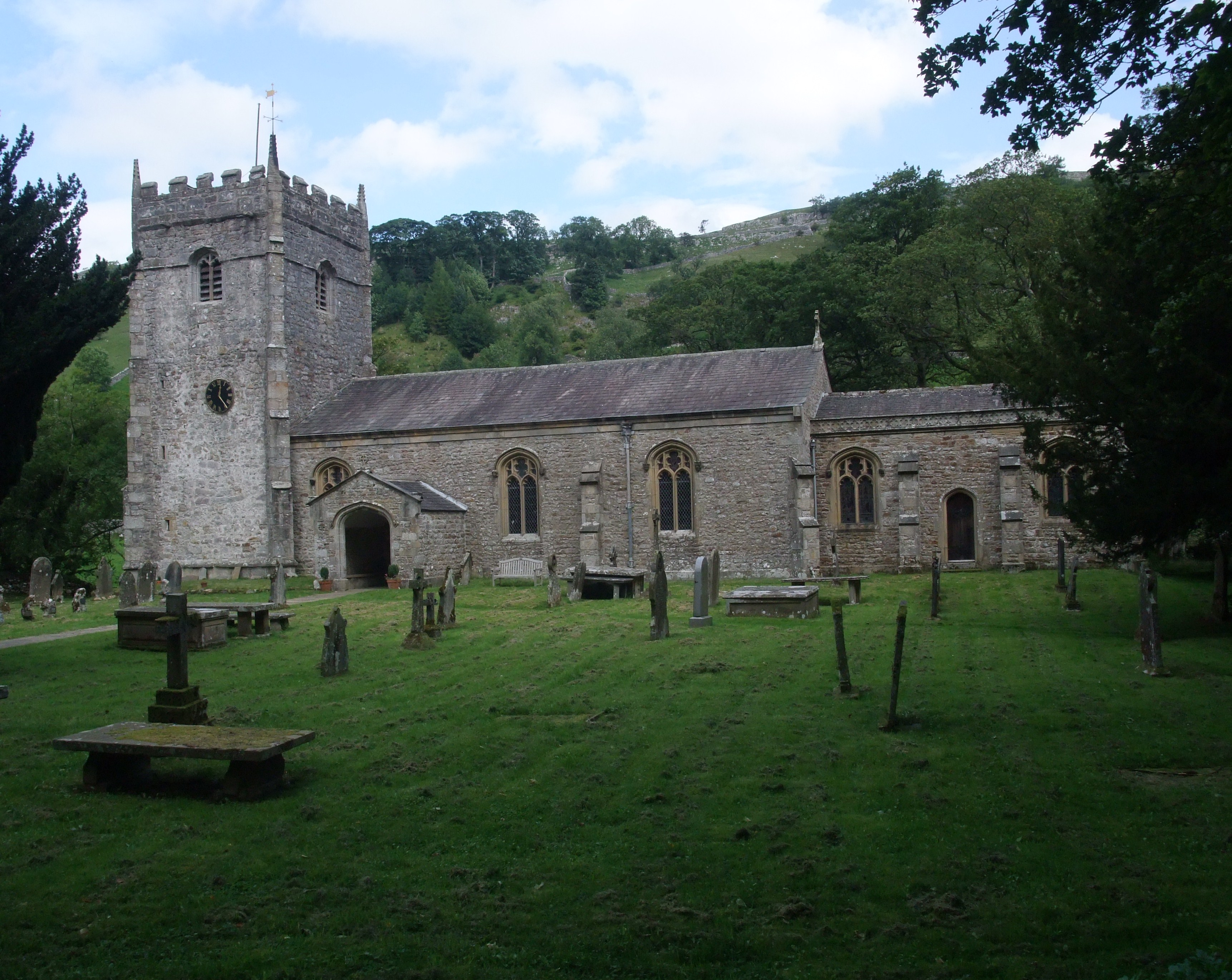
The church, in 2010

St Oswald's Church is the parish church of Arncliffe, North Yorkshire, in England.

The oldest part of the church is the tower, which was constructed in the 15th century. The remainder of the church was demolished and rebuilt in 1805. The church was restored in 1841, and the chancel was rebuilt in 1843, all this work being by Anthony Salvin. In 1958, the church was Grade II listed.

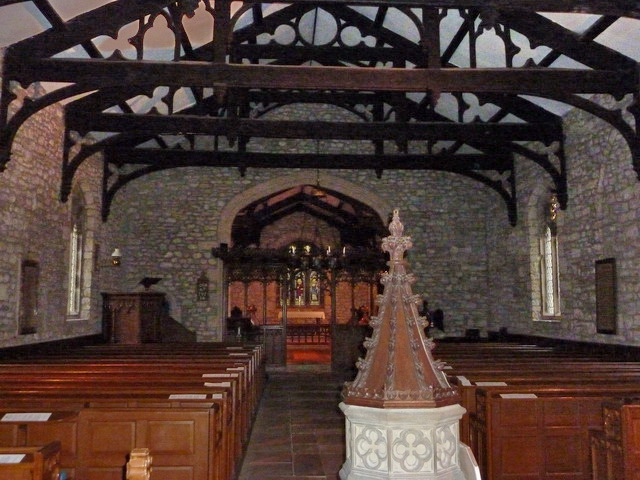
View from the nave into the chancel

The church is built of limestone, with a slate roof. It has a three-bay nave and a lower two-bay chancel, a north aisle, and a south porch. The tower is at the west end and has two stages, with diagonal buttresses. It has a three-light west window, a clock on the south side, two-light windows to the belfry, and battlements with corner finials. The east window of the chancel also has three lights, and stained glass made by William Wailes. There is a queen post roof.

== See also ==
- Listed buildings in Arncliffe, North Yorkshire
