= Stainforth Bridge =

Packhorse bridge in North Yorkshire, England

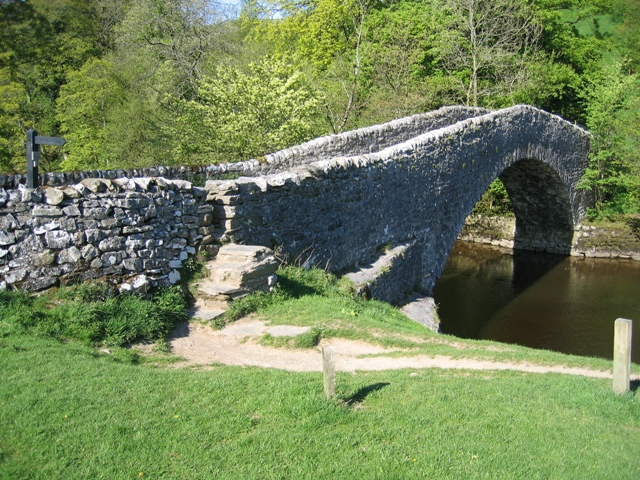
- Stainforth Bridge
- Coordinates: 54.100°N 2.280°W
- OS grid reference: SD818672
- Crosses: River Ribble
- Locale: Stainforth, North Yorkshire, England
- Other name(s): Stainforth Packhorse Bridge; Knight Stainforth Bridge

Characteristics
- Total length: 57 feet (17.4 m)
- Width: 7 feet 2 inches (2.18 m) (Note: At its widest point)
- Height: 5.3 metres (17 ft) (Note: The height is measured from the centre of the arch above normal water level.)
- No. of spans: 1

History
- Opened: c. 1675

Location
- Interactive map of Stainforth Bridge

Stainforth Bridge, (also known as Stainforth packhorse bridge and Knight Stainforth bridge) is a 17th century, arched packhorse bridge over the River Ribble in Stainforth, North Yorkshire, England. The bridge was formerly on the main packhorse road between York and Lancaster, which has been superseded by later roads. It was in private ownership until the 1930s, when it was taken on by the National Trust. It is now a grade II listed structure and provides access to Stainforth Force, which is just below the bridge.

== History ==
The bridge was built by Samuel Watson c. 1675, (Note: Various dates have been given for the building of the bridge; 1670, 1675, late 17th century. The hall was built in 1670 and the bridge a few years afterwards, so the dates have been confused.) a local Quaker who owned Knight Stainforth Hall, a Jacobean house which was nearby. Previous to this, the site was a ford which was impassable during times of flood, and a local legend suggests that the crossing was used by the Romans. The bridge carries a minor road, Dog Hill Brow, over the river connecting Knight and Little Stainforth. Besides being a Medieval road linking York and Lancaster, and a monastic route taken by monks between their houses in Yorkshire and the Lake District, the route was also a packhorse road connecting Clapham with Malham. A covenant was drawn up in the year of the bridge's building stating that people on foot, or with carts and cattle, had "free passage between the towns of Knight Stainforth and Stainforth Under Bargh." The bridge was built by using tradesmen from Stainforth-under-Bargh (now the main village of Stainforth), and in return, the people of Stainforth were afforded full usage rights, as the bridge was also a necessity locally.

Both of the bridge abutments are set into solid rock and the bridge itself is 17.4 metres (57 ft) long and 5.3 metres (17 ft) at its highest point above the normal water level. At its widest point, it reaches 7 feet 2 inches (2.18 m). The limestone that the bridge is built on, is part of the Kilnsey Limestone, which is younger than the Chapel House limestone underneath Stainforth Force, which is only 100 yards (91 m) below the bridge.

On 23 September 1931, the bridge went from private ownership into the National Trust, helped by an endowment by the previous owners. Doubts had been expressed about the structure after heavy motor vehicles had been using it, causing the bridge to be weakened. It was thought that the National Trust could enforce restrictions on heavy goods vehicles more effectively than private owners.

The bridge was registered in 1988 by Historic England as a Grade II listed structure under the name of Knight Stainforth Bridge.

== See also ==
- Listed buildings in Stainforth, North Yorkshire
