= River Skirfare =

River in North Yorkshire, England

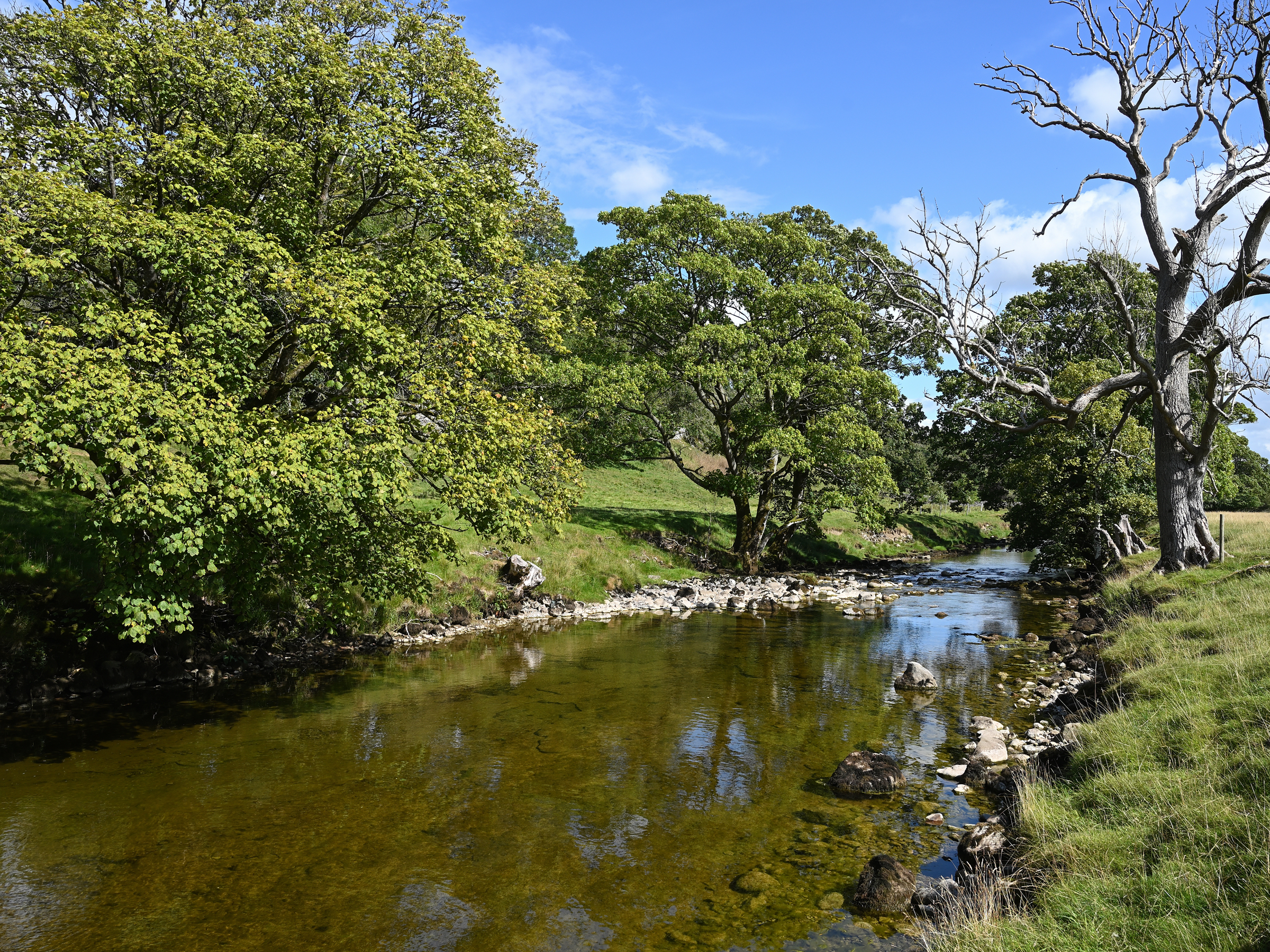
- River Skirfare at Hawkswick

Location
- Country: England

Physical characteristics
- Source
  - location: Confluence of Foxup Beck and Cosh Beck
  - coordinates: 54.186503°N 2.197014°W
  - elevation: 1,470 ft (450 m)
- Mouth
  - location: River Wharfe
  - coordinates: 54.119264°N 2.035975°W
  - elevation: 636 ft (194 m)
- Length: 15.24 km (9.47 mi)

Basin features
- EA waterbody IDs: GB104027069250; GB104027069230; GB104027064180

River Skirfare is a small river in North Yorkshire, England, that flows through Littondale and ends where it joins the larger River Wharfe. The source is the confluence of Foxup Beck and Cosh Beck at the hamlet of Foxup. The confluence with the Wharfe is called the Amerdale Dub.

The name is of Old Norse origin, from skírr "bright" or "clear" and far "river-course".

== Course ==
The source of the river is the confluence of Foxup Beck and Cosh Beck at the hamlet of Foxup, some 1,470 feet (450 m) above sea level. To the east bank lays Hawkswick Moor and on the west bank lays Darnbrook Fell, Hawkswick Clowder and Pen-y-ghent Fell. The river meanders consistently south-east for approximately 9.5 miles (15.3 km) to the confluence with the River Wharfe.

The river drains a catchment area of 20.27 square miles (52.51 km^{2}). The upper reach of the river above the hamlet of Litton is known to dry up in the summer months with the water flowing underground. It is known that there are huge caverns underneath Littondale where the water sinks, but it reappears south of Arncliffe. Outside of summer, the normal range of the water can be up to 1 foot 11 inches (0.58 m), however, the highest level recorded is of 9 feet 2 inches (2.79 m), at Skirfare Bridge on 20 February 2022. The water seeping underground is what Marie Hartley and Joan Ingilby state is the reason that saved the valley of Littondale from becoming a huge reservoir. Leeds council considered taking the waters from the river in the 1850s, which they labelled as the "Skirfare Scheme."

== Flora and fauna ==
Trout and bullhead are known to be in the river and its tributaries. Trout use many of the smaller side streams as nurseries for their fry. Signal crayfish are known to have inhabited the Upper Wharfe and the Skirfare riverine system. Imported signal crayfish were kept in a trout farm on the Wharfe in 1983, and it is thought they have got into the river system from there. Historically, the lady's slipper orchid used to grow along the banks of the River Skirfare (examples were noted in the 1930s), however, they now only grow in one site in the Yorkshire Dales.

== Literary connections ==
The valley of Littondale was also previously known as Amerdale, and in his poem The White Doe of Rylstone, Wordsworth refers to the "..deep fork at Amerdale..". In the Water-Babies by Charles Kingsley, Littondale and the Skirfare are referred to as Vendale.

== Lists ==
=== Tributaries ===
From the source of the river:

- Halton Gill Beck
- Newshot Gill
- Hesleden Beck
- Potts Beck
- Fosse Beck
- Cowside Beck
- Cote Gill
- Sleets Gill Beck
- Moss Beck

=== Settlements ===
From the source of the river:

(valley called Littondale)

- Foxup
- Halton Gill
- Hesleden
- Litton
- Arncliffe
- Arncliffe Cote
- Hawkswick

=== Crossings ===
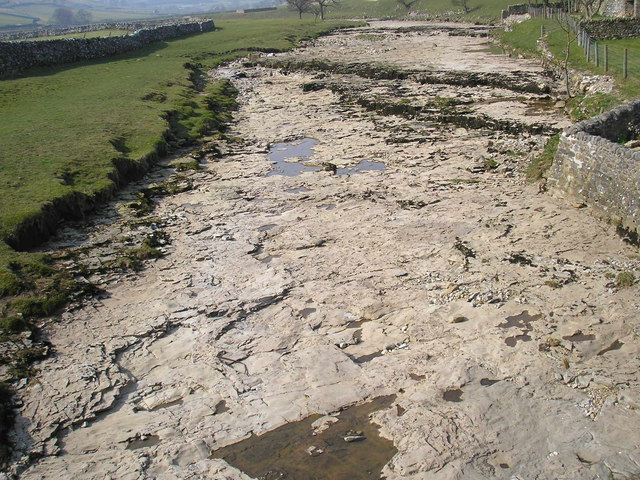
River Skirfare in a dry state

From the source of the river:

- Foxup Bridge
- Halton Gill Bridge
- Unnamed bridge to Nether Hesleden
- Fording point
- New Bridge on farm track
- Footbridge near Litton
- Fording point south of Litton
- Arncliffe Bridge
- Footbridge north of Hawkswick
- Hawkswick Bridge
- Skirfare Bridge on B6160

== Gallery ==
Along the River Skirfare
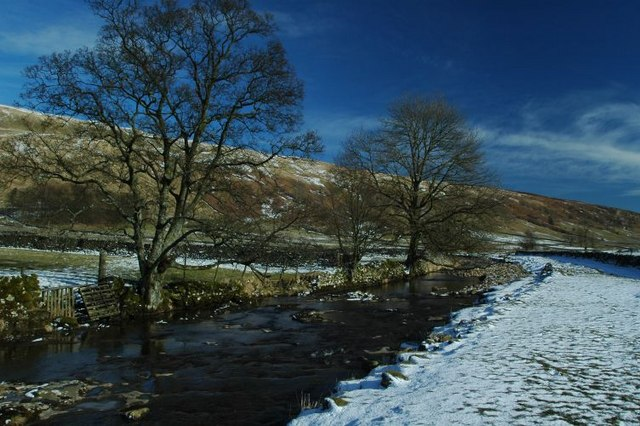
River Skirfare passing through Halton Gill

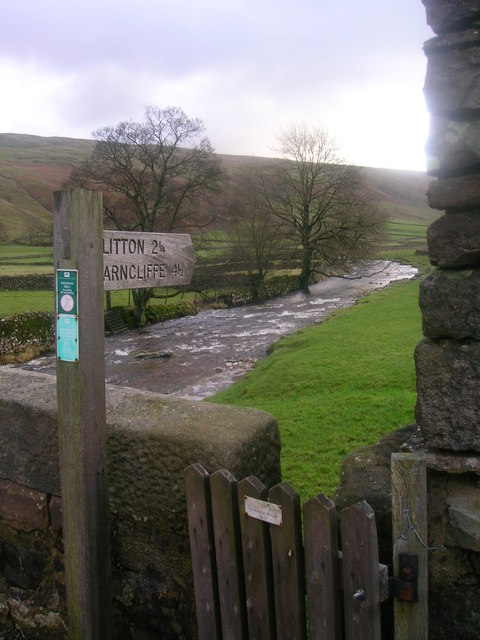
Litton walking sign on Halton Gill Bridge

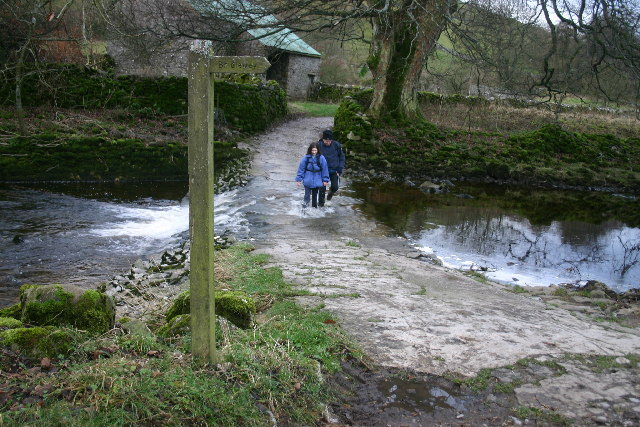
Ford, River Skirfare near Litton

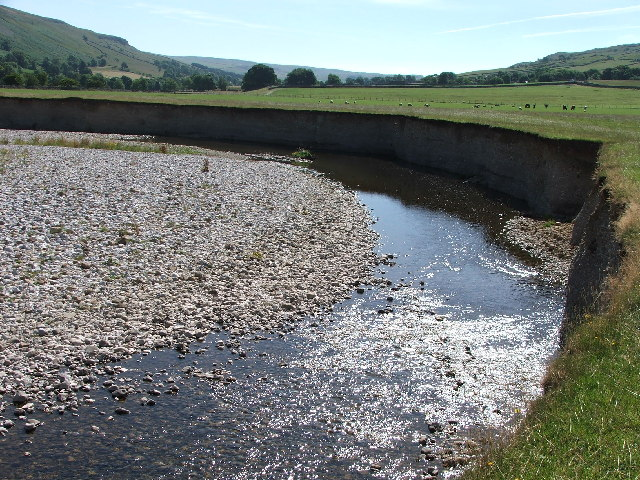
River erosion near Arncliffe, Littondale, Yorkshire Dales

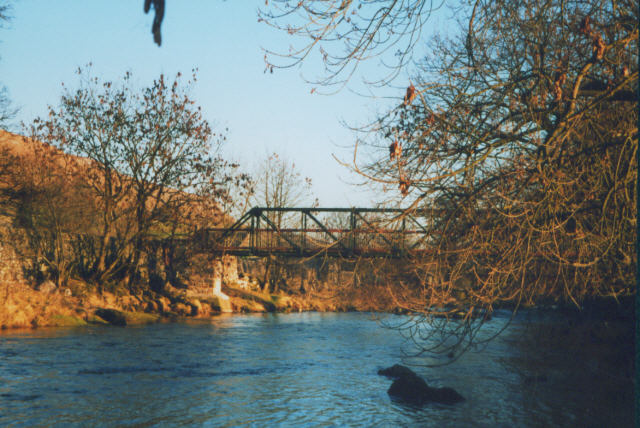
Footbridge on Old Gang Lane, Hawkswick

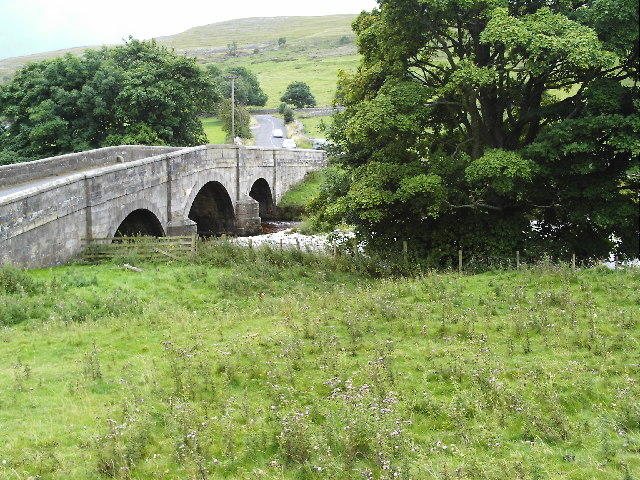
Skirfare Bridge near confluence with River Wharfe
