= Pen-y-ghent =

Mountain in the Yorkshire Dales, England

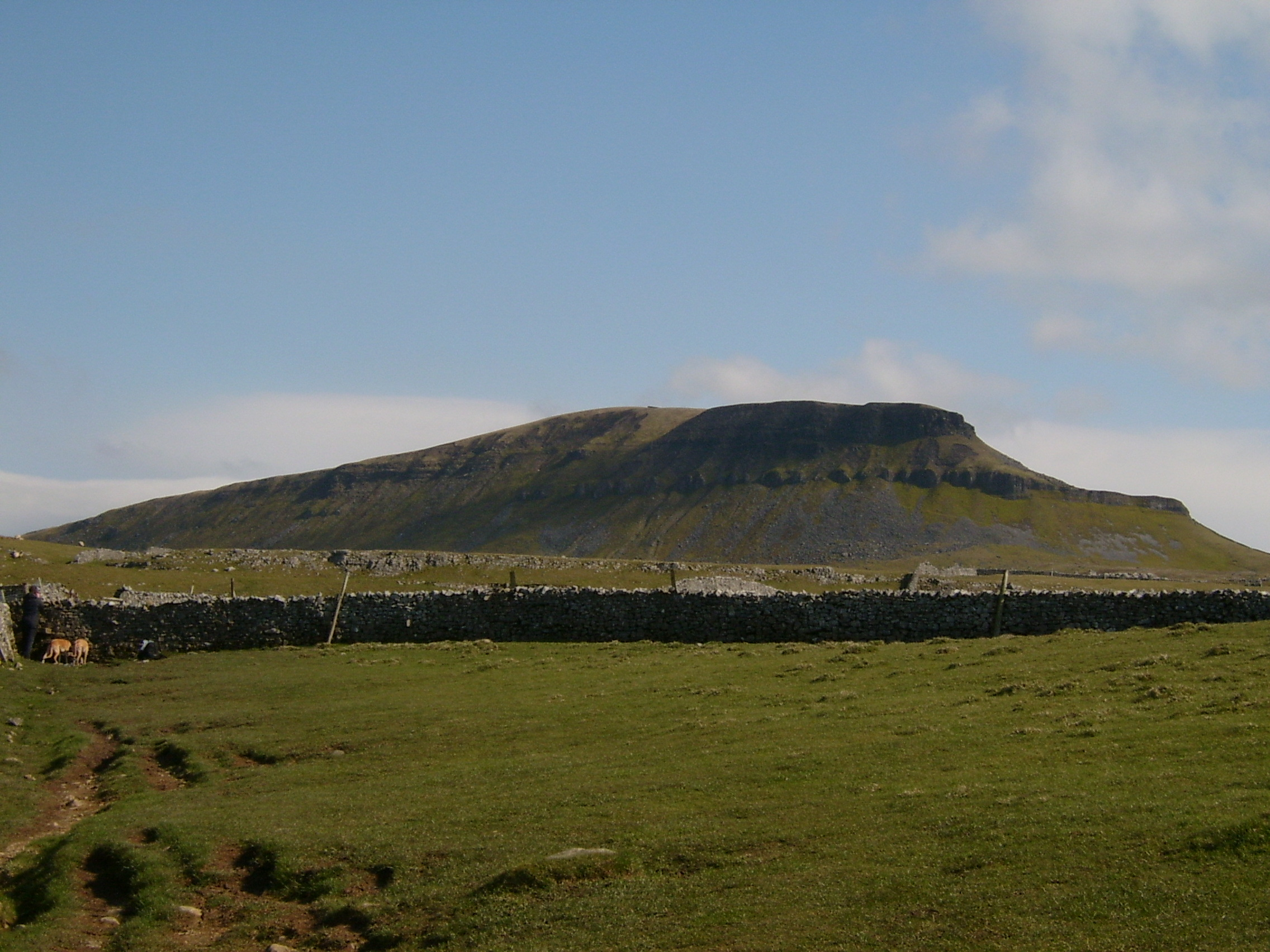
- From the path from Horton

Highest point
- Elevation: 694 m (2,277 ft)
- Prominence: c. 306 m (1,004 ft)
- Parent peak: Whernside
- Listing: Marilyn, Hewitt, Nuttall
- Coordinates: 54°09′19″N 2°14′59″W

Naming
- English translation: Hill on the border
- Language of name: Cumbric
- Pronunciation: /ˈpɛnɪɡɛnt/

Geography
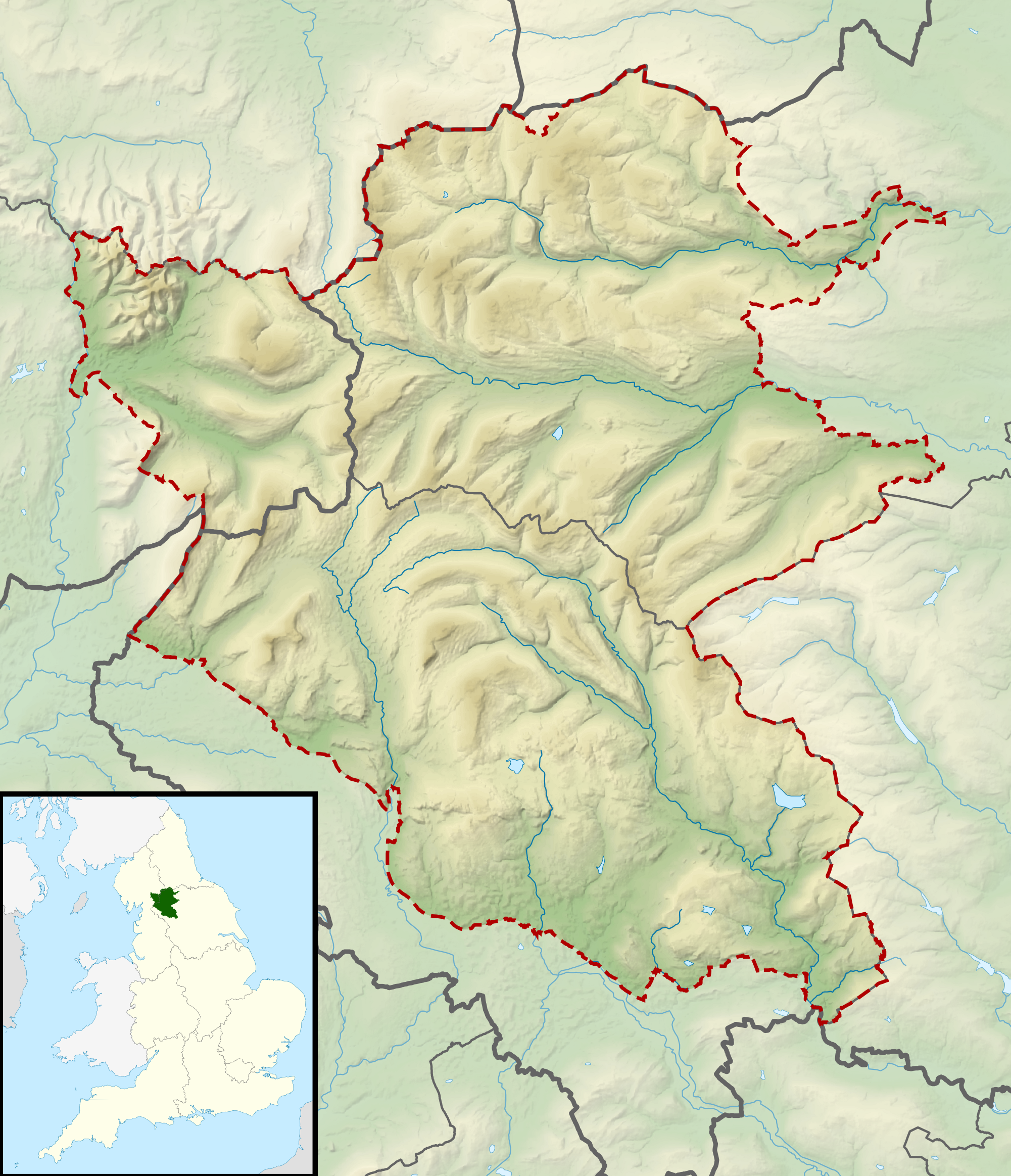
- Location within Yorkshire Dales
- Location: Yorkshire Dales, England
- OS grid: SD838733
- Topo map: OS Landranger 98

Pen-y-ghent or Penyghent is a fell in the Yorkshire Dales, England. It is the lowest of Yorkshire's Three Peaks at 2,277 feet (694 m); the other two being Ingleborough and Whernside. It lies 1.9 miles (3 km) east of Horton in Ribblesdale. It has a number of interesting geological features, such as Hunt Pot, and further down, Hull Pot. The waters that flow in have created an extensive cave system which rises at Brants Gill head.

In 2004 the body of Lamduan Armitage, dubbed by the media the "Lady of the Hills", was found near to the entrance of Sell Gill Hole.

== Etymology ==
In the Cumbric language, as in today's Welsh, pen meant 'top' or 'head', and y is most likely the definite article (the) (compare Pen-y-berth 'end of the hedge/copse', or Pen-y-ffordd 'head of the road/way', etc.). The element ghent is more obscure; it could be taken to be 'edge' or 'border'. The name Pen-y-ghent could therefore mean 'hill on the border' (compare Kent). Or else, the final element may be gïnt, meaning "a heathen, a gentile" (< Latin gentis; cf. Welsh gynt), presumably in reference to Scandinavian pagans. Early Ordnance Survey maps give the name as Pennegent; the hyphenated form first appears in OS maps of the 1890s. The name is sometimes written as Pen y Ghent.

== Geography ==
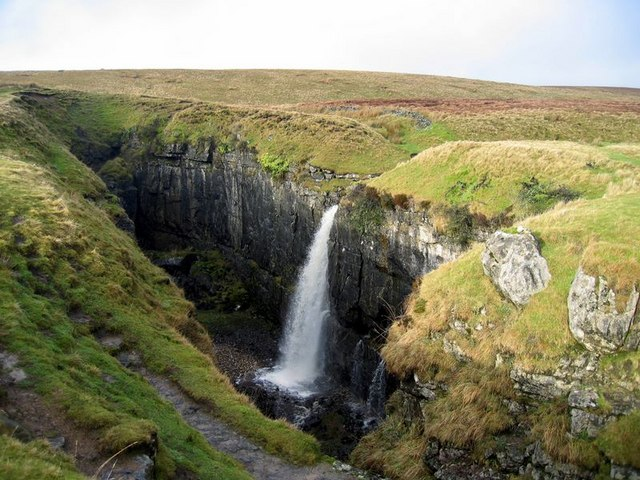
Hull Pot Beck spilling into Hull Pot, looking north-west

Pen-y-Ghent is made up of a millstone grit top upon a bed of carboniferous limestone. The summit acts as a watershed with water flowing east into the River Skirfare and on through to the Humber Estuary, and water flowing west dropping into the River Ribble, to ultimately flow into the Irish Sea. The distinctive rakes that adorn the hillside (particularly on the western edge of Pen-y-Ghent) were revealed during a great storm in July 1881. The ferocity of the water cascading down the hillside removed the topsoil and revealed the rakes beneath.

Hull Pot Beck rises on the western side of Plover Hill and flows into Hull Pot, which is said to be the largest natural hole in England. Hull Pot measures 300 feet (91 m) long by 60 feet (18 m) wide and 60 feet (18 m) deep. The water then flows under Horton Moor before re-appearing just east of Horton in Ribblesdale as Brants Ghyll Beck, where it flows into the River Ribble. The pot is a collapsed cavern and there is little to explore underground. In dry weather the beck takes an underground route before it gets to the rim. It resurfaces as a waterfall below in the pot itself. In very wet weather the stream runs over the edge into the pot, creating a spectacular waterfall. In extreme flood conditions the entire chasm can fill it to the brim, and overflow onto the hillside. The lower pitches of the cave are described as "some of the most flood prone in the Dales and can only be descended in very low water levels.

An 18th century a guide-book named it "Hulpit", 'and was described as "like the inside of an enormous old Gothic castle, the high ruinous walls of which were left standing after the roof was fallen in". Local legend has it that the waters from Hull Pot and Hunt Pot cross each other underground without mixing. This is said to have first been noted when a sheep wash was undertaken in one stream thereby making it muddy, and the husks of oats being dropped into the other stream and both having exited into the Ribble without mixing together.

== Hiking ==
The Pennine Way links the summit to the village; the route is around 3.1 miles (5 km) in length as the Way curves initially to the north before turning east to reach the summit. The more direct route that traverses the southern 'nose' of the hill is the route often taken by those attempting the Yorkshire Three Peaks Challenge, as the walk is usually done in an anti-clockwise direction starting and finishing in Horton in Ribblesdale. The other main hillwalking route on the hill heads north from the summit to reach Plover Hill before descending to join Foxup Road, a bridleway at the head of Littondale.

Pen-y-ghent is one of the mountains on the Yorkshire Three Peaks route.

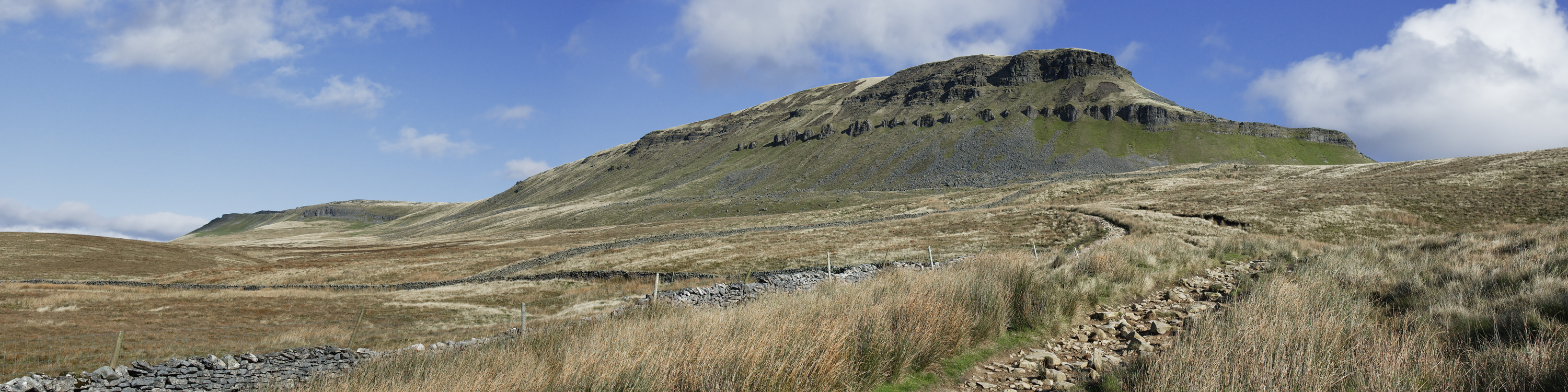
A panoramic image of Pen-y-ghent viewed from the west, on the footpath from Horton in Ribblesdale, January 2012. Plover Hill is the lower, more distant hill to the left.

== Bibliography ==
- Bibby, Andrew (2008), The Backbone of England, London: Francis Lincoln Limited
- Ekwall, Eilert (1960), The Concise Oxford Dictionary of English Place-Names, 4th ed., Oxford: Oxford University Press
