= Tealeaf willow =

Tealeaf willow or tea-leaved willow is a common name for several plants and may refer to:

- Salix phylicifolia, native to northern Europe and northwestern Asia
- Salix planifolia, native to northern and western North America
- Salix pulchra, native to northern North America and northeastern Asia
