= Staincliffe Wapentake =

Former administrative area of Yorkshire, England

Coordinates: 53.922°N 2.042°W

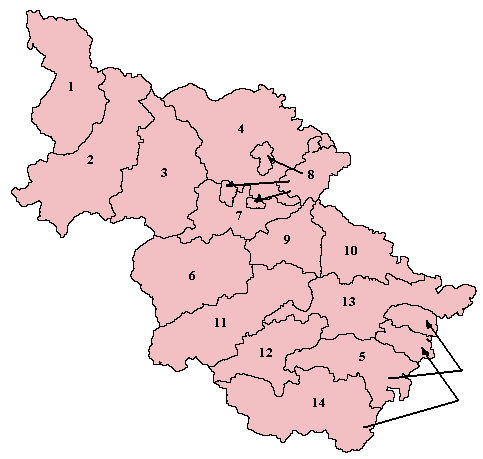
Wapentakes of the West Riding. The East Division labelled 3 on the map, and the West Division is labelled 2.

Staincliffe, also known as Staincliff, was a wapentake of the West Riding of Yorkshire, England.

The wapentake was named from a place called Staincliffe, now lost, in Bank Newton, not to be confused with Staincliffe near Dewsbury. Staincliffe was presumably where the wapentake originally met, although in the 12th century it met at Flasby.

The wapentake was split into two divisions. The East Division included the ancient parishes of Barnoldswick, Bracewell, Broughton, Burnsall, Carleton, Gargrave, Hebden, Keighley, Kettlewell, Kildwick, Linton, Marton in Craven, Skipton, Thornton in Craven and parts of Arncliffe and Addingham.

The West Division included the parishes of Bolton by Bowland, Giggleswick, Gisburn, Kirkby Malhamdale, Long Preston, Slaidburn and parts of Arncliffe, Browsholme, Mitton, and Sawley. Some parts of the Forest of Bowland attached to the Chapelry of Whitewell, were part of the Lancashire parish of Whalley in neighbouring Blackburnshire.

== Old Deanery of Craven ==
The old Deanery of Craven was approximately equivalent to the Wapentake of Staincliff.
