= Litton, North Yorkshire =

Village and civil parish in North Yorkshire, England

Coordinates: 54.163020°N 2.146380°W

Litton
- Location within North Yorkshire
- Population: 70
- OS grid reference: SD905741
- Civil parish: Litton
- Unitary authority: North Yorkshire
- Ceremonial county: North Yorkshire
- Region: Yorkshire and the Humber
- Country: England
- Sovereign state: United Kingdom
- Post town: SKIPTON
- Postcode district: BD23
- Police: North Yorkshire
- Fire: North Yorkshire
- Ambulance: Yorkshire

Litton is a village and civil parish in Littondale in the Yorkshire Dales in England. It lies in the county of North Yorkshire, 1.5 miles (2.4 km) up Littondale from Arncliffe. From Litton a footpath leads 3 miles (4.8 km) over the fells to the north east to Buckden in Wharfedale. The population of the civil parish was estimated at 70 in 2015.

The centre of the village is an old public house, the Queens Arms, that dates back to the 17th century. Associated with the Queens Arms since 2003 is the Lamb Brewing Company (previously the Litton Brewery) that brews Litton Ale.

Litton was mentioned in the Domesday Book of 1086 (as Litone). The name probably comes from the Old English hlið "hillside" and tūn "farmstead".

Litton was historically a township in the ancient parish of Arncliffe, part of Staincliffe Wapentake in the West Riding of Yorkshire. Litton became a separate civil parish in 1866. The parish was transferred to the new county of North Yorkshire in 1974. From 1974 to 2023 it was part of the Craven District, it is now administered by the unitary North Yorkshire Council.

== See also ==
- Listed buildings in Litton, North Yorkshire

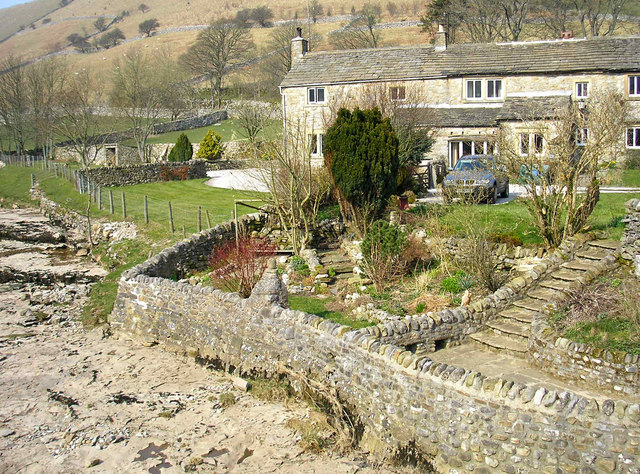
Houses near the river at Litton
