= Stainforth, North Yorkshire =

Village and civil parish in North Yorkshire, England

Coordinates: 54.10197°N 2.27462°W

Stainforth
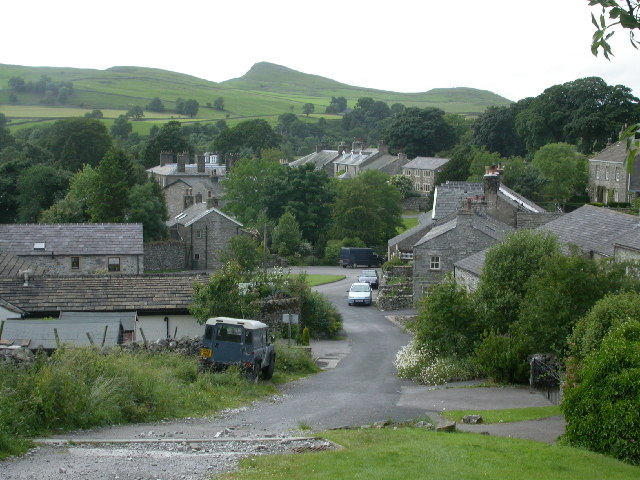
- Stainforth

- Location within North Yorkshire
- Population: 231
- OS grid reference: SD821673
- Civil parish: Stainforth
- Unitary authority: North Yorkshire
- Ceremonial county: North Yorkshire
- Region: Yorkshire and the Humber
- Country: England
- Sovereign state: United Kingdom
- Post town: SETTLE
- Postcode district: BD24
- Police: North Yorkshire
- Fire: North Yorkshire
- Ambulance: Yorkshire

Stainforth is a village and civil parish in the county of North Yorkshire, England, situated north of Settle. Nearby there is a waterfall, Stainforth Force, where the river falls over limestone ledges into a deep, broad pool which can be accessed by walking a short way from the village. There was a Youth Hostel at Taitlands between 1942 and 2007.

Until 1974 it was part of the West Riding of Yorkshire. From 1974 to 2023 it was part of the Craven District, it is now administered by the unitary North Yorkshire Council.

== History ==
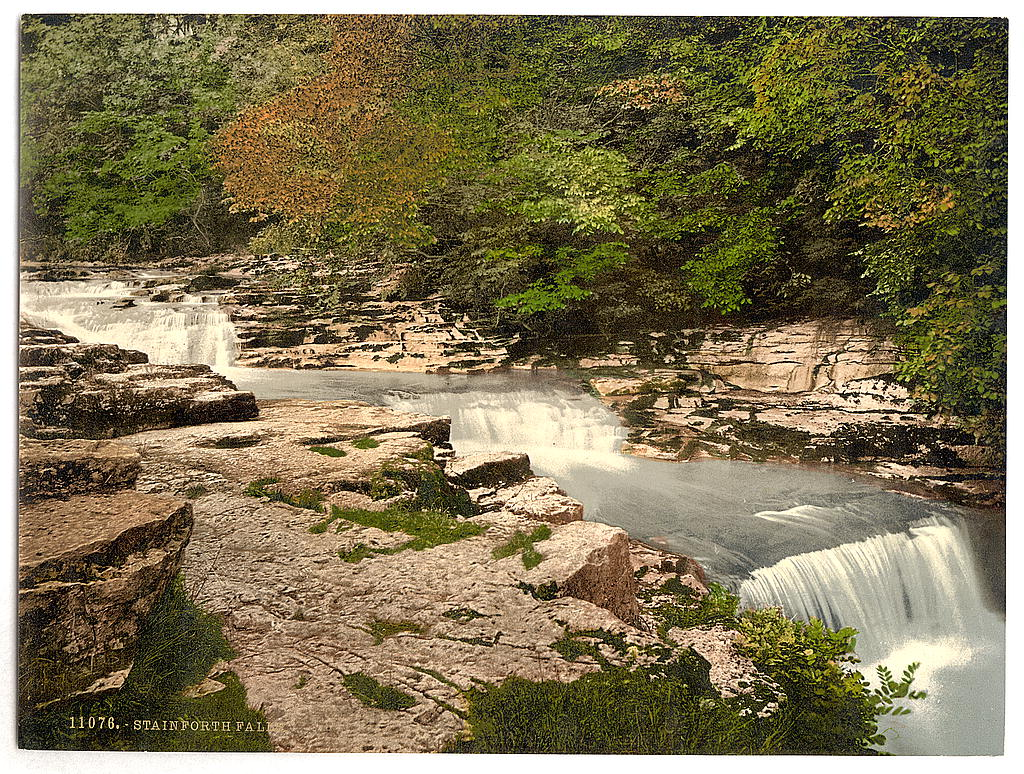
Stainforth Falls, c. 1890–1900

Its name derives from the 'stony ford' which linked two settlements half a mile apart on opposite banks of the River Ribble north of Settle. Stainforth, on the eastern side, was formerly owned by Sawley Abbey, whose monks developed the estate, which prospered, while Little Stainforth, under private ownership, declined. In 1595 Edward Darcy received from four trustees acting for the previous owner the manor of Stainforth Underbargh and 20 dwelling houses with lands there. He was Groom of the Chamber to Elizabeth I and was knighted eight years later.

In the 1670s, Samuel Watson replaced the ford by a packhorse bridge whose arch spans a wooded stretch of the river, and a grassy patch leads downstream to Stainforth Force. In Little Stainforth the three-storey Stainforth Hall was built at the same time and is now occupied as a farmhouse.

== See also ==
- Listed buildings in Stainforth, North Yorkshire
