= Lenten ys come with love to toune =

13th or 14th century Middle English lyric poem

"Lenten ys come with love to toune", also known as "Spring", is an anonymous late-13th or early-14th century Middle English lyric poem which describes the burgeoning of nature as spring arrives, and contrasts it with the sexual frustration of the poet. It forms part of the collection known as the Harley Lyrics. Possibly the most famous of the Middle English lyrics, it has been called one of the best lyrics in the language, and "a lover's description of spring, richer and more fragrant in detail than any other of its period." No original music for this poem survives, but it has been set to music by Benjamin Britten, Alan Rawsthorne and others. It was included in The Oxford Book of English Verse.

== Summary ==
The poet begins by presenting a picture of awakening nature as springtime (lenten) arrives. He mentions the various burgeoning flowers and herbs to be seen: daisy, woodruff, rose, lily, fennel and chervil. The nightingales, song thrushes and wild drakes call, the moon shines and animals make merry. But

Mody meneth, so doh mo —
Ichot, Ych am on of tho —
For love that likes ille.

Moody ones complain, and yet do more —
I know, for I am one of those —
Of love that hardly pleases.

He returns to the prospect of moon, sun, dew, birds and animals.

Wormes woweth under cloude;
Wymmen waxeth wounder proude,

Worms make love under ground;
Women grow wondrously proud,

but if the poet is not favoured by one in particular he must forego all this and flee in exile to the woods, or, by an alternative interpretation of the last line, "be banished as a madman".

== Composition and transmission ==
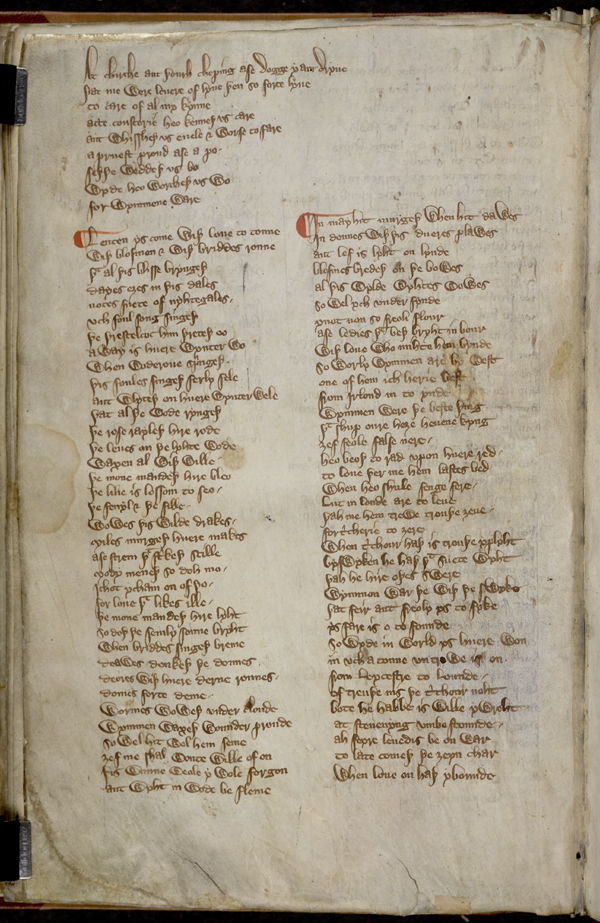
London, British Library, Harley MS 2253, f. 71v. This folio includes "Lenten ys come with love to toune" on the left and the first three stanzas of "In May hit murgeþ when hit dawes" on the right.

"Lenten ys come with love to toune" is an anonymous poem, thought to have been composed in the late 13th or early 14th century. It has reached us as one of the Harley Lyrics, a collection of Middle English lyric poems preserved, among much other material, in British Library MS Harley 2253, fol. 71^{v}. In this folio the text is presented in two columns, the left one consisting of "Lenten ys come with love to toune" and the right one of the first three stanzas of "In May hit murgeþ when hit dawes". The Harley Lyrics were collected and copied into the manuscript between about 1331 and 1341 by a writer known only as the Ludlow scribe, a professional legal scribe who worked in Ludlow, Shropshire between 1314 and 1349. The manuscript was later owned by the 17th-century antiquary John Battely, from whose heirs it was purchased in 1723 by Robert Harley, 1st Earl of Oxford and Mortimer. Harley's collection of books and manuscripts remained in his family for some years, then passed in the mid-18th century to the British Museum. The reading public was made aware of "Lenten ys come with love to toune" in 1774, when Thomas Warton included the opening six lines in the first volume of The History of English Poetry (1774), together with a curious "mash-up" of lines from "Lenten" and "In May hit murgeþ when hit dawes". It was published in full by Joseph Ritson in his Ancient Songs (1790, recte 1792).

== Versification ==
"Lenten ys come with love to toune" is written with an appearance of unsophisticated spontaneity which, it has been argued, conceals "a complex and sure art", a rich display of verbal music achieved through artful alliteration which builds to a climax of intricately chiming sounds. The poem consists of three tail-rhyme stanzas, each of twelve lines rhyming AABCCBDDBEEB. The tail lines, i.e. the third, sixth, ninth and twelfth, each have three stresses, and all others have four. With two exceptions, both in the first stanza, each line in the poem includes two or more alliterating words, linking the two halves of each line together and also connecting the tail line with the preceding line.

== Sources and analogues ==
As a reverdie, a poem celebrating springtime bird-song and flowers, "Lenten ys come with love to toune" bears a resemblance to French lyric poems, but its diction and alliteration are typically English, drawing on an English tradition of earlier songs and dances which celebrate the coming of spring. Examples of Middle English lyrics on similar themes include "Bytuene Mersh ant Averil", "As dew in Aprille", "Sumer is icumen in" and "Foweles in the frith". The first stanza of one lyric in particular, "The Thrush and the Nightingale", has close verbal parallels to "Lenten", indeed the first couplet in one manuscript is identical with "Lenten"'s first couplet. Both "The Thrush and the Nightingale" and "In May hit murgeþ when hit dawes", the poem paired with "Lenten" in the Harley manuscript, use "Lenten"'s metre. The original readers of the Harley manuscript necessarily read "Lenten" and "In May" together, and it has been proposed that the last stanza of "In May" is intended also to form a fourth and last stanza of "Lenten". "Lenten" has also been held to prefigure the sensibility of the opening lines of Chaucer's Canterbury Tales, and the argument of John Gower's Confessio Amantis, Book 8, lines 2223–2230.

== Themes ==
"Lenten"'s references to daisies, roses, lilies and the moon recall the use of these images in evocations of Jesus Christ and the Virgin Mary, and are perhaps intended to suggest the purity of the natural world. Yet the poem is also remarkable for its nakedness of feeling, earthiness, and sexual frankness. The poet's inner life is shown intimately tied up with nature, an English countryside presented from the poet's own observation, possibly aided by instructions in some work on rhetoric on how to describe nature. Love is here a thing of the outdoor world, where sexual encounters were perhaps more likely to take place; it is not, as in Provençal troubadour lyrics, of the indoor world in castle and court. Spring is seen as almost literally dancing, and so is love, since spring, in the poet's view, is always accompanied by love. But this rejoicing which all can share comes alongside the poet's own anguish over his sexual frustration.

== Musical settings ==
In all likelihood "Lenten" was meant to be sung, but if so the original music is lost. Elisabeth Lutyens set the poem for unaccompanied chorus, but later withdrew this work. Alan Rawsthorne's Chamber Cantata (c. 1937), scored for soprano and chamber ensemble, includes "Lenten" along with Alexander Montgomerie's "The nicht is neir gone", and the anonymous poems "Of a rose is al myn song" and "Wynter wakeneth all my care". Sacred and Profane (1975), Benjamin Britten's cantata for unaccompanied voices, sets St. Godric's "Sainte Marye Virgine" and the anonymous "Foweles in the frith", "Lenten ys come with love to toune", "Mirie it is while sumer ilast", "Whanne ic se on Rode", "Maiden in the mor lay", "Ye that pasen by the weiye" and "Wanne mine eyhen misten". The Mediæval Bæbes' album The Huntress begins with a setting of "Lenten" by Katharine Blake and Kavus Torabi.
