= Most I ryden by Rybbesdale =

Middle English lyric poem

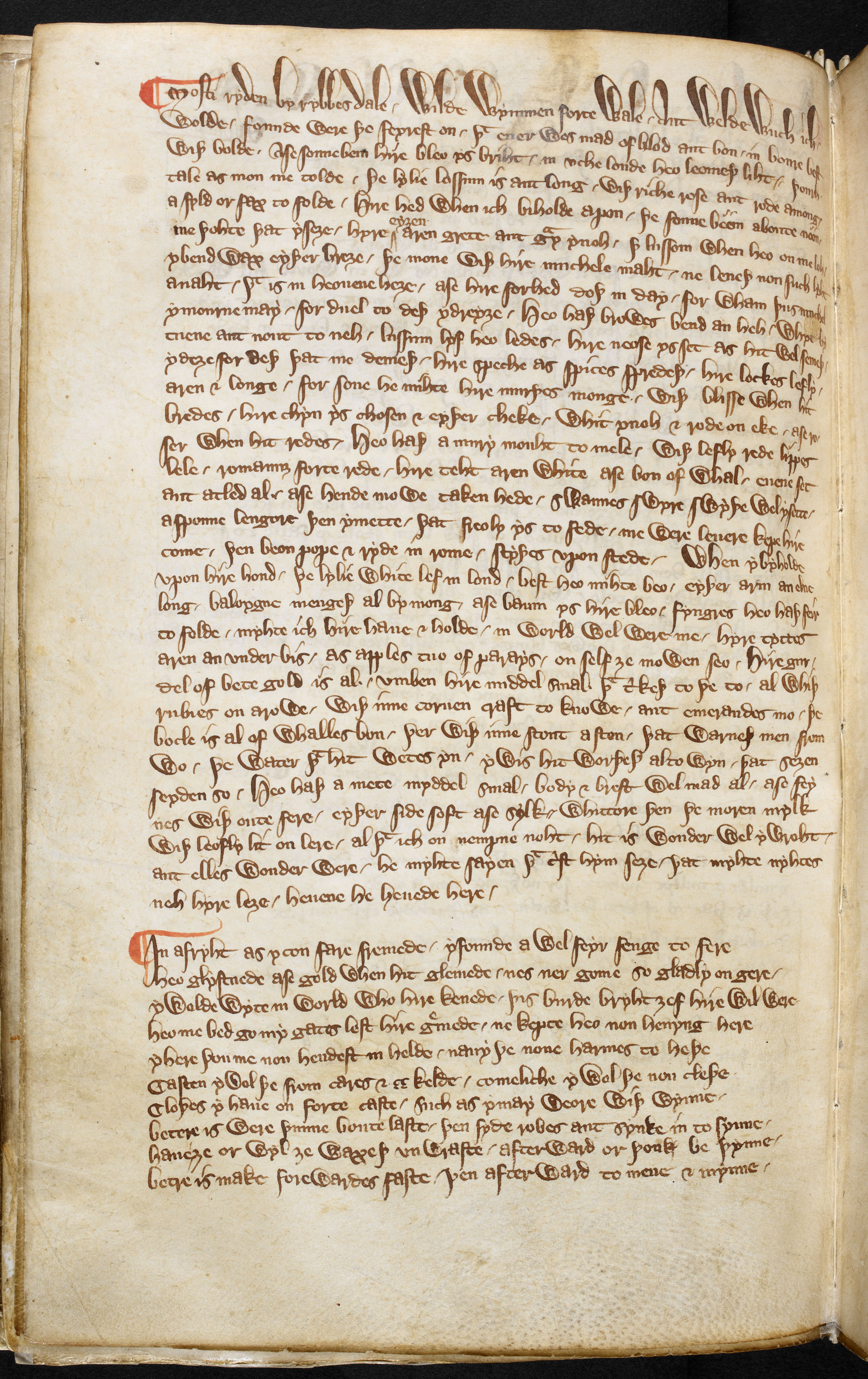
- Text contains Most I ryden by Rybbesdale, and the start of In a fryht as Y con fare fremede
- Written: late-13th or early-14th century
- Language: Middle English

"Most I ryden by Rybbesdale" ('If I were to ride through Ribblesdale'), also titled "The Fair Maid of Ribblesdale", is an anonymous late-13th or early-14th century Middle English lyric poem. The text forms part of the collection known as the Harley Lyrics (MS. Harley 2253, f. 66v).

== Summary ==
In this secular lyric the which the speaker lists and describes the various parts of his lady (excepting one) in a literary blason.

== See also ==
- In a fryht as Y con fare fremede
- A wayle whyt ase whalles bon
- Lenten ys come with love to toune
- In May hit murgeth when hit dawes
- Geoffrey of Vinsauf
- Gwerful Mechain

== Sources ==
- Fein, Susanna Greer, ed. (2014). "Art. 34, Most I ryden by Rybbesdale: Introduction". The Complete Harley 2253 Manuscript. TEAMS Middle English Texts. Vol. 2 (online ed.). Kalamazoo, MI: Medieval Institute Publications.
- Millett, Bella, ed. (30 July 2003). "Mosti ryden by Rybbesdale: introduction". Wessex Parallel WebTexts.
