= Middle English literature =

The term Middle English literature refers to the literature written in the form of the English language known as Middle English, from the late 12th century until the 1470s. During this time the Chancery Standard, a form of London-based English, became widespread and the printing press regularized the language. Between the 1470s and the middle of the following century there was a transition to early Modern English. In literary terms, the characteristics of the literary works written did not change radically until the effects of the Renaissance and Reformed Christianity became more apparent in the reign of King Henry VIII. There are three main categories of Middle English literature, religious, courtly love, and Arthurian, though much of Geoffrey Chaucer's work stands outside these. Among the many religious works are those in the Katherine Group and the writings of Julian of Norwich and Richard Rolle.

After the Norman Conquest of England, Law French became the standard language of courts, parliament, and society. The Norman dialects of the ruling classes mixed with the Anglo-Saxon of the people and became Anglo-Norman, and Anglo-Saxon underwent a gradual transition into Middle English. Around the turn of the thirteenth century, Layamon wrote in Middle English. Other transitional works were popular entertainment, including a variety of romances and lyrics. With time, the English language regained prestige, and in 1362 it replaced French and Latin in Parliament and courts of law. Early examples of Middle English literature are the Ormulum and Havelock the Dane. In the fourteenth century major works of English literature began once again to appear, including the works of Chaucer. The latter portion of the 14th century also saw the consolidation of English as a written language and a shift to secular writing. In the late 15th century William Caxton printed four-fifths of his works in English, which helped to standardize the language and expand the vocabulary.

== Early period ==
After the Norman Conquest of England, the written form of the Old English language continued in some monasteries but few literary works are known from this period. Under the influence of the new aristocracy, Law French became the standard language of courts, parliament, and polite society.

As the invaders integrated, their language and literature mingled with that of the natives. The Norman dialects of the ruling classes became Anglo-Norman, and Old English underwent a gradual transition into Middle English. Political power was no longer in English hands, so the West Saxon literary language had no more influence than any other dialect. Middle English literature is written, then, in the many dialects that correspond to the history, culture, and background of the individual writers.

While Anglo-Norman or Latin was preferred for high culture and administration, English literature by no means died out, and a number of important works illustrate the development of the language.

During the writing of Ormulum (c. 1150 – c. 1180), the blending of both Old English and Anglo-Norman elements in English are highlighted for the first time, marking the beginning of the Middle English period.

Around the turn of the thirteenth century, Layamon wrote his Brut, based on Wace's twelfth century Anglo-Norman epic of the same name.

Other transitional works were preserved as popular entertainment, including a variety of romances and lyrics. With time, the English language regained prestige, and in 1362 it replaced French and Latin in Parliament and courts of law. Early examples of Middle English literature are the Ormulum, Havelock the Dane, and Thomas of Hales's Love Rune.

The Mercian dialect thrived between the 8th and 13th centuries and was referred to by John Trevisa, writing in 1387:

"For men of the est with men of the west, as it were undir the same partie of hevene, acordeth more in sownynge of speche than men of the north with men of the south, therefore it is that Mercii, that beeth men of myddel Engelond, as it were parteners of the endes, understondeth better the side langages, northerne and southerne, than northerne and southerne understondeth either other…"

Not much lyrical poetry of the thirteenth century remains, and even fewer secular love poems; "Foweles in the frith" is one exception.

== Late period ==
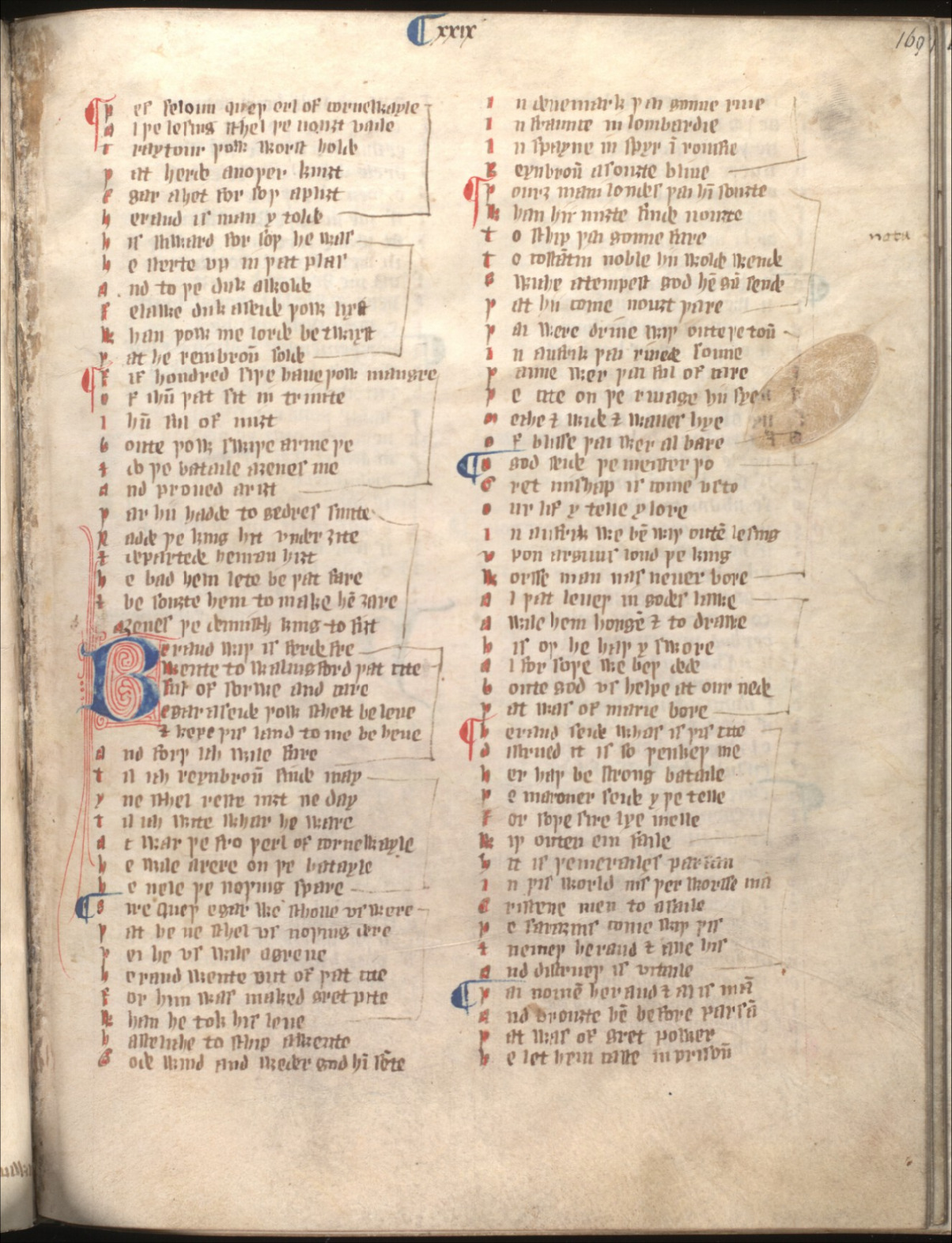
A page from the Auchinleck Manuscript which contains a large collection of Middle English poetry

It was with the fourteenth century that major works of English literature began once again to appear; these include the so-called Pearl Poet's Pearl, Patience, Cleanness, and Sir Gawain and the Green Knight; Langland's political and religious allegory Piers Plowman; John Gower's Confessio Amantis; and the works of Geoffrey Chaucer, the most highly regarded English poet of the Middle Ages, who was seen by his contemporaries as an English successor to the great tradition of Virgil and Dante. Far more manuscripts of the Prick of Conscience than any other Middle English poem survive, however.

The Kildare Poems are a rare example of Middle English literature produced in Ireland, and give an insight into the development of Hiberno-English.

The latter portion of the 14th century also saw not only the consolidation of English as a written language, taking over from French or Latin in certain areas, but a large shift from primarily theological or religious subject matter to also include that of a more secular nature. Vernacular book production saw a growth in the number of books being copied, both secular and religious. Thus, the latter portion of the 14th century can be seen as one of the most significant periods in the history of the English language.

The reputation of Chaucer's successors in the 15th century has suffered in comparison with him, though Lydgate, Thomas Hoccleve, and Skelton are widely studied. At this time the origins of Scottish poetry began with the writing of The Kingis Quair by James I of Scotland. The main poets of this Scottish group were Robert Henryson, William Dunbar, and Gavin Douglas. Henryson and Dunbar introduced a note of almost savage satire, which may have owed something to the Gaelic bardic poetry, while Douglas's version of Virgil's Aeneid is one of the early monuments of Renaissance literary humanism in English.

It was a vibrant time for religious drama as well: many morality plays and miracle plays were produced, and some scripts survive today. Sidrak and Bokkus is another example of late Middle English literature.

=== Caxton and the English language ===
In the late 15th century the first English printer, William Caxton, printed four-fifths of his works in English. He translated a large number of works into English; Caxton translated 26 of the titles himself. Caxton is credited with printing as many as 108 books, 87 of which were different titles. However, the English language was changing rapidly in Caxton's time and the works he was given to print were in a variety of styles and dialects. Caxton was a technician rather than a writer and he often faced dilemmas concerning language standardisation in the books he printed. (He wrote about this subject in the preface to his Eneydos.) His successor Wynkyn de Worde faced similar problems.

Caxton is credited with standardising the English language (that is, homogenising regional dialects) through printing. This facilitated the expansion of English vocabulary, the development of inflection and syntax and the ever-widening gap between the spoken and the written word. However, Richard Pynson, a Frenchman who started printing in London in 1491 or 1492 and who favoured Chancery Standard English, was a more accomplished stylist and consequently pushed the English language even further toward standardisation.

== See also ==
- Scots makars
- English mystery plays
- Northern Homily Cycle
- When the Nightingale Sings
