= Ichot a burde in boure bryht =

- Written: c. 1300
- Language: Middle English

Full text
- Oxford Book of English Verse 1250-1918/Blow, Northern Wind at Wikisource

"Ichot a burde in boure bryht" ('I know a lady in a bright bower'), sometimes titled, after its burden, "Blow, Northerne Wynd", is an anonymous late-13th or early-14th century Middle English lyric poem (the burden may have popular or folk origins antedating 1300). The text forms part of the collection known as the Harley Lyrics (MS. Harley 2253, ff. 72v–73r).

== See also ==
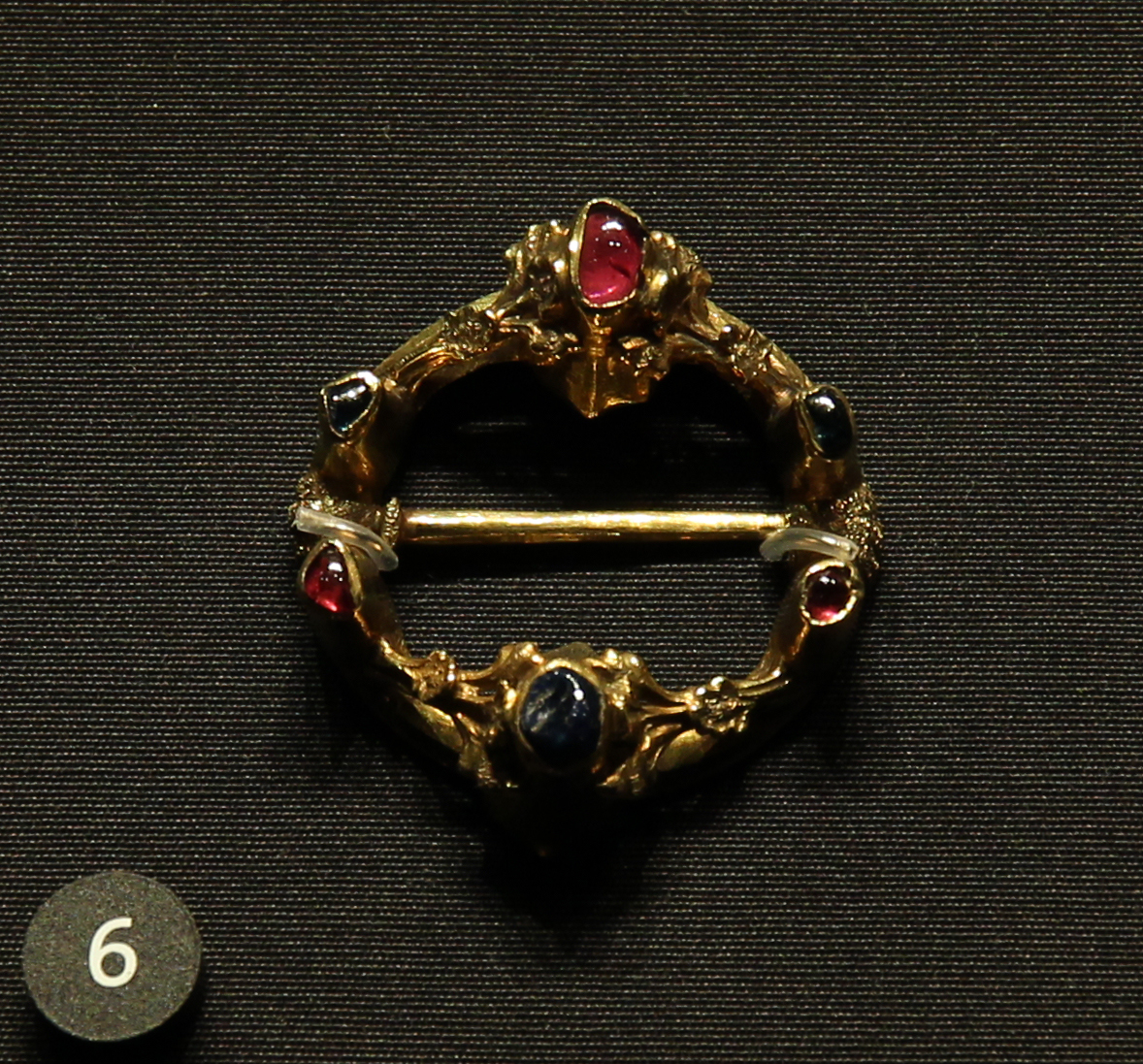
Brooch. Gold, rubies and sapphires, 1250–1300, French or English

- North wind
- Westron Wynde

== Sources ==
- Fein, Susanna Greer, ed. (2014). "Art. 46, Ichot a burde in boure bryht: Introduction". The Complete Harley 2253 Manuscript. TEAMS Middle English Texts. Vol. 2 (online ed.). Kalamazoo, MI: Medieval Institute Publications.
- Frey, Charles (1976). "Interpreting 'Western Wind'". English Literary History. 43 (3): 264–5. doi:10.2307/2872415. JSTOR 2872415.
