= Sacred and Profane (Britten) =

1975 choral composition by Benjamin Britten

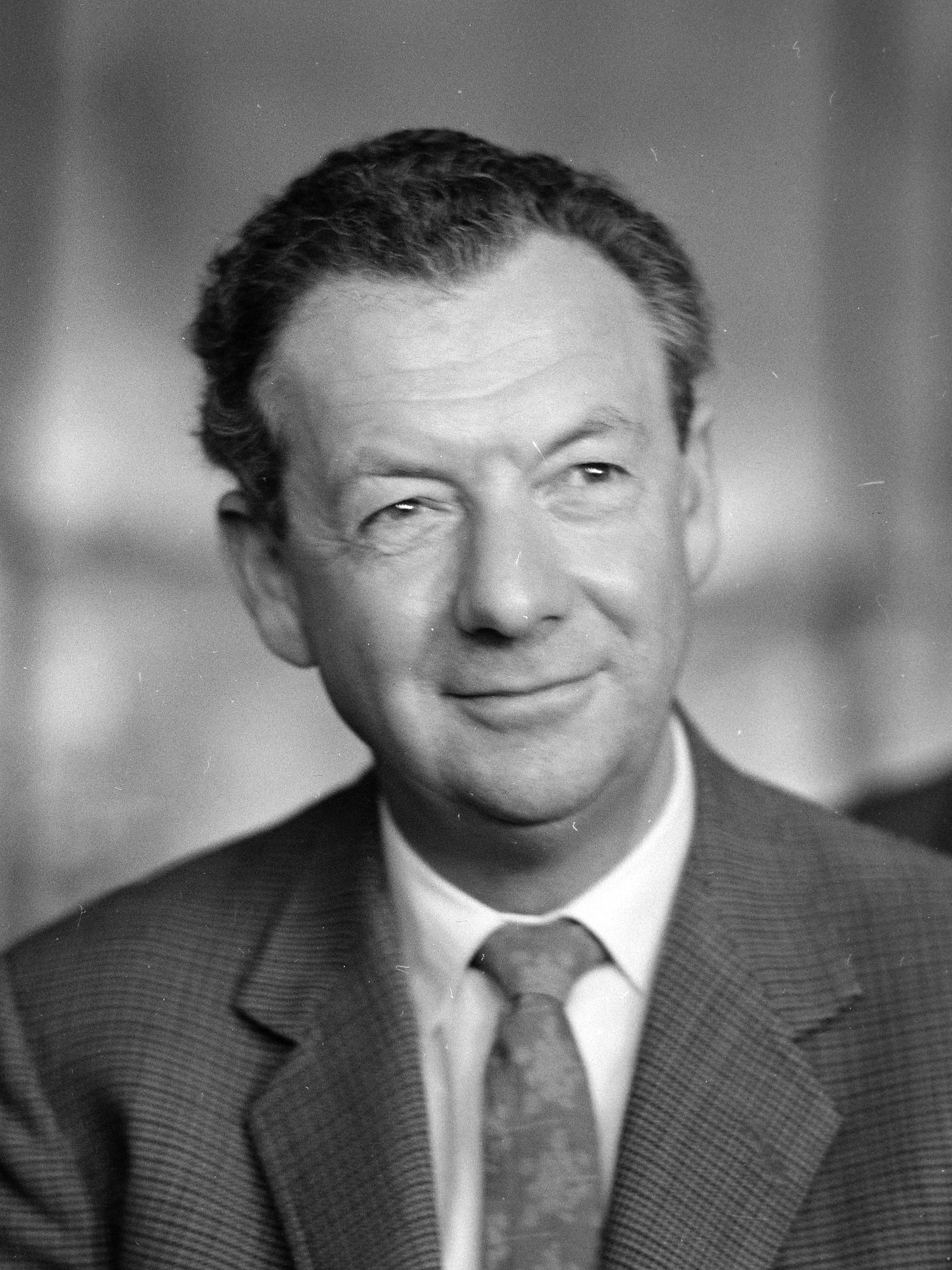
Benjamin Britten in 1965

Sacred and Profane, Op. 91, is a collection of 'Eight Medieval Lyrics' for unaccompanied voices in five parts (SSATB) composed by Benjamin Britten in 1975.

The work was first performed by the Wilbye Consort of Voices, for whom the work was composed, on 14 September 1975 at The Maltings, Snape in Suffolk, England (Elaine Barry & Rosemary Hardy, sopranos, Margaret Cable, contralto, Nigel Rogers, tenor, Geoffrey Shaw, bass), directed by Peter Pears.

== Structure ==
The piece comprises eight lyrics based on medieval English poems.

1. St Godric's Hymn
2. I mon waxe wod ("Foweles in the frith")
3. Lenten is come
4. The long night
5. Yif ic of luve can
6. Carol
7. Ye that pasen by
8. A Death

== Music ==
The opening song is characterized by its use of descending glissandi, rising chords, and modal inflection. The second, "I mon waxe wod", correlates nature with madness. The third setting uses syncopation and imitation to celebrate the arrival of spring, while the fourth returns to sombre winter. The fifth and seventh songs are based on the Passion, and contrast with the "folksy" sixth setting. The collection concludes with its longest piece, which as the title suggests deals with themes of mortality.
