= Alysoun =

Anonymous Middle English poem

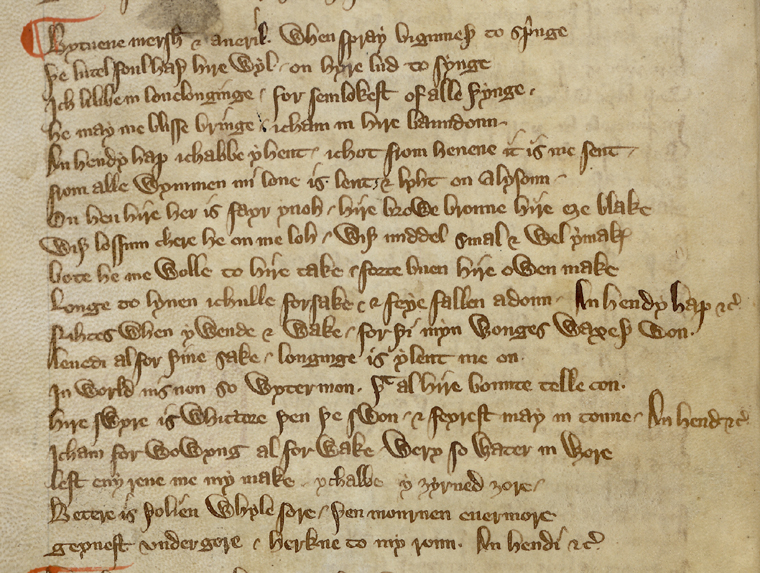
The original manuscript of the poem, BL Harley MS 2253 f.63^{v}

"Alysoun" or "Alison", also known as "Bytuene Mersh ant Averil", is a late-13th or early-14th century poem in Middle English dealing with the themes of love and springtime through images familiar from other medieval poems. It forms part of the collection known as the Harley Lyrics, and exemplifies its best qualities. There may once have been music for this poem, but if so it no longer survives. "Alysoun" was included in The Oxford Book of English Verse, The Norton Anthology of English Literature, and The Longman Anthology of British Literature. It has been called one of the best lyrics in the language.

== Synopsis ==
The poet begins by evoking the image of birds singing in the springtime, before declaring that he is love. In the refrain he tells us that he is fortunate: his love has been withdrawn from all other women and lighted on Alison. He describes her beauty and says that he will die unless she accepts him. He is sleepless and pale with longing for her; no-one can describe her goodness, for she is the most beautiful of all women. He is worn out with worry that someone else will take her. "It’s better to feel pain awhile than grieve forevermore. Most kind under skirt, listen to my song!" Excerpt from the poem can be seen below:

Middle English

¶ Bytuene Mersh & Aueril,
When spray biginneþ to springe,
Þe lutel foul haþ hire wyl
On hyre lud to synge.
Ich libbe in loue-longinge
For semlokest of alle þynge;
He may me blisse bringe—
Icham in hire baundoun.

An hendy hap ichabbe yhent;
Ichot from heuene it is me sent;
From alle wymmen mi loue is lent,
& lyht on Alysoun.

Translation:
Modern English

Between March and April
When the leaves begin to open
The little bird takes its desire
In its own language to sing
I live in love-longing
For the most beautiful of all things
She is able to bring me joy
I am in her power

A gracious fate I have received
I know from Heaven it is sent to me
From all women my love is withdrawn
And settled on Alysoun

== Composition and transmission ==
"Alysoun" is an anonymous poem, thought to have been composed in the late 13th or early 14th century. It has reached us as one of the Harley Lyrics, a collection of Middle English lyric poems preserved, among much other material, in British Library Harley MS 2253. The Harley Lyrics were collected and copied into the manuscript between about 1331 and 1341 by a writer known only as the Ludlow scribe, a professional legal scribe who worked in Ludlow, Shropshire between 1314 and 1349. The manuscript was later owned by the 17th-century antiquary John Battely, from whose heirs it was purchased in 1723 by Robert Harley, 1st Earl of Oxford and Mortimer. Harley's collection of books and manuscripts remained in his family for some years, then passed in the mid-18th century to the British Museum. The reading public was first made aware of "Alysoun" in 1774, when Thomas Warton included an extract from it in the first volume of The History of English Poetry (1774). It was published in full by Joseph Ritson in his Ancient Songs (1790, recte 1792), and then in George Ellis's Specimens of the Early English Poets (2nd edition, 1801).

== Analysis ==
This poem is written with an apparently artless spontaneity and lack of sophistication which, it has been argued, conceals "a complex and sure art". It may actually be the lyric of a song, but this cannot be proved since no music for it survives; at any rate, with the poem's rhythmic and melodic qualities it is eminently singable. The poem's images are those of the ordinary speech of the people, and its language is very largely of Anglo-Saxon rather than Romance derivation, though the words baundoun and bounte stand out as exceptions. It is a reverdie, a poem of springtime, redolent of the first breaking of spring "between March and April", albeit the poet, who was working with the Julian calendar, was actually writing about a time closer to mid-April in our Gregorian calendar. Though it is possible to classify this as a courtly poem, and the poet to be in an attitude of courtly love with an idealized figure, Alysoun has also been seen as "a bodily presence, not an abstract ideal". The extremes of joy and sorrow produced in the poet by his love for this young lady are presented in close juxtaposition, or dialogue, making their relationship a more interesting and dynamic one than is usual in Middle English lyrics. Alysoun's name has been related to the Old French word alis, “smooth, delicate, soft, slim (of waist)”, and the Middle English word lisse, “comfort, ease, joy, delight”, suggesting to the reader ideas of beauty and pleasure.

== Versification ==
The poem consists of four stanzas, each comprising eight lines, and each being followed by the refrain. The rhyme scheme is demanding, being ABABBBBC in the stanza and DDDC in the refrain, with C remaining the same throughout the poem. The meter demands three stresses in the final line of each stanza and of the refrain, but the poet does not succeed in keeping to this pattern in the first and fourth stanzas. There is also much alliteration.

== Sources and analogues ==
"Alysoun", it has been claimed, draws on a tradition of earlier songs and dances which celebrate the coming of spring. The images of springtime, the singing of birds, the ardent lover's thoughts of his beloved, the list of her bodily charms, the poet's pleas for mercy, his declaration that he is in thrall to her, will die without her, cannot sleep for love of her, yet knows that he is blessed by heaven – all this appears in countless other lyrics of the time, written in French, Occitan, and Italian. The actual phrases used have parallels in other Middle English lyrics.

== Modern editions available online ==
- Brook, G. L., ed. (1948). The Harley Lyrics: The Middle English Lyrics of MS Harley 2253. Publications of the University of Manchester, 302. Manchester: Manchester University Press. p. 33.
- Millett, Bella (24 July 2003). "Bytuene Mersh ant Aueril". Wessex Parallel Web Texts. With facing Modern English translation
- Fein, Susanna Greer, ed. (2014). "Art. 29, Bytuene Mersh ant Averil". TEAMS Middle English Texts Series. University of Rochester.
