= Maiden in the mor lay =

Middle English lyric

"Maiden in the mor lay" or "The Maid of the Moor" is a Middle English lyric of the early 14th century, set to a melody which is now lost. The literary historian Richard L. Greene called it "one of the most haunting lyrics of all the Middle Ages", and Edith Sitwell thought it "a miracle of poetry". It is a notoriously enigmatic poem, perhaps devotional, perhaps secular, which depicts a maiden in the wilderness who lives on flowers and spring-water. Critics are divided in their interpretation of her: she may be the Virgin Mary, Mary Magdalene, a water-sprite, or an ordinary human girl. The 14th-century bishop Richard de Ledrede's dissatisfaction with this song led to an alternative lyric for it being written, a Latin religious poem, Peperit virgo.

== Text ==
Original Middle English text

Maiden in the mor lay,
In the mor lay,
Sevenyst fulle
Sevenist fulle.
Maiden in the mor lay,
In the mor lay,
Sevenistes fulle ant a day.

Welle was hire mete:
Wat was hire mete?
The primerole ant the,
The primerole ant the,
Welle was hire mete:
Wat was hire mete?
The primerole ant the violet.

Welle was hire dryng:
Wat was hire dryng?
The chelde water of the,
The chelde water of the,
Welle was hire dryng:
What was hire dryng?
The chelde water of the welle spring.

Welle was hire bour:
Wat was hire bour?
The red rose an te,
The red rose an te,
Welle was hire bour:
Wat was hire bour?
The rede rose an te lilie flour.

Text in modernized spelling

Maiden in the moor lay,
In the moor lay,
Seven-night full,
Seven-night full—
Maiden in the moor lay,
In the moor lay,
Seven-night full and a day.

Well was her meat.
What was her meat?
The primerole and the—
The primerole and the—
Well was her meat.
What was her meat?
The primerole and the violet.

Well was her drink.
What was her drink?
The chill water of the—
The chill water of the—
Well was her drink.
What was her drink?
The chill water of the well-spring.

Well was her bower.
What was her bower?
The red rose and the—
The red rose and the—
Well was her bower.
What was her bower?
The red rose and the lily flower.

== Manuscript and publication ==
The poem survives in only one manuscript, Bodleian Library Rawlinson D.913, which was bequeathed to the library in 1755 by the antiquarian bibliophile Richard Rawlinson. Bound into this manuscript is a strip of vellum, eleven inches by four inches, on which are written about a dozen poems including "Maiden in the mor lay", "Hay! Robyne, Malkin", and the well-known lyric "Ich am of Irlaunde". "Maiden in the mor lay" has been transcribed into the manuscript in an abbreviated form which requires modern editors to reconstruct its full text.

The poem was first published by Wilhelm Heuser in 1907 in the German academic journal Anglia, but came to wider attention when Kenneth Sisam included it in his 1921 anthology Fourteenth Century Verse & Prose and again when it appeared in W. H. Auden and Norman Holmes Pearson's Poets of the English Language (1950).

== Peperit virgo ==
The Red Book of Ossory is a 14th-century manuscript containing a number of poems on sacred subjects intended to replace the lyrics of pre-existing songs. The manuscript's compiler, Richard de Ledrede, Bishop of Ossory, intended thereby to discourage clerics in his diocese from singing "songs that are lewd, secular, and associated with revelry". One of the poems included, Peperit virgo, bears a marginal note reading "[M]ayde y[n] the moore [l]ay". The stanza form of Peperit virgo will with only fairly slight adjustment match that of "Maiden in the mor lay", so that the Latin words could have been sung to the tune of the English lyric. That tune is now lost.

== Analysis ==
The identity of the maiden in this poem has been the subject of enough dispute to warrant comparing her to the Dark Lady of Shakespeare's sonnets. The Middle English scholar D. W. Robertson Jr. interpreted her as the Virgin Mary, and the moor as "the wilderness of the world under the Old Law before Christ came". Medieval artists, he wrote, sometimes depicted the Virgin Mary adorned with roses and lilies, as in the last verse of the poem. E. M. W. Tillyard preferred to see her as Mary Magdalene, or alternatively as Mary of Egypt, and Joseph C. Harris concurred that the maiden is the Mary Magdalene of medieval legend pursuing an ascetic life in the wilderness, or moor.

On the other hand it has been argued that Richard de Ledrede's inclusion of "Maiden in the mor lay" among the lewd and secular songs that required new pious lyrics precludes any possibility of its being a religious poem. This argument has been strengthened by the discovery of a reference in a 14th-century Latin sermon to a canticus or karole called "þe mayde be wode lay", together with a marginal note quoting the line "þe cold water of þe well spryng". The words canticus and karole suggest a secular song, and the textual variant ("be wode" for "in the mor") could indicate that it was a popular song whose precise words varied from place to place. The general style of "Maiden in the mor lay" also suggests to some critics a popular, secular song rather than a devotional one. This opens other possibilities in interpreting the figure of the maiden. She has been seen as a spirit of the well-spring connected with midsummer fertility rites known as "well-wakes", where perhaps "Maiden in the mor lay" was sung while one of the participants impersonated her in a dramatic dance or mime. Alternatively it might be a song used to accompany a game. If so, it could, as R. A. Waldron suggested, be a children's singing game in which a dead girl is described as being buried "in the mire".

But it may not be necessary to choose between secular and religious interpretations of the poem. These, and other Middle English lyrics, could quite possibly have been intended to be capable of diverse readings.

== Musical settings ==
As noted above, the music to which this lyric was set does not survive, though one modern edition, that of Dobson and Harrison, prints it with the melody of the unrelated 13th-century song "Bryd on brere".

In 1958 the film composer James Bernard published Three Mediaeval Poems, settings for unaccompanied chorus of "Maiden in the mor lay" along with the anonymous Falcon Carol and Chaucer's "Nowe welcome, Somor". Benjamin Britten's Sacred and Profane, first performed in 1975, is a work for vocal quintet or five-part chorus to eight Middle English texts, including the "Maiden". Nicholas Sackman's setting of the poem for tenor and percussion was composed for The NMC Songbook, a 2009 release celebrating the 20th birthday of NMC Recordings.
