= When the Nightingale Sings =

- by unknown

When The Nightingale Sings is a Middle English poem, author unknown, recorded in the British Library's Harley 2253 manuscript, verse 25. It is a love poem, extolling the beauty and lost love of an unknown maiden.

== The Mantha ==
When þe nyhtegale singes þe wodes waxen grene.
Lef ant gras ant blosme springes in aueryl y wene,
Ant love is to myn herte gon wiþ one spere so kene
Nyht ant day my blod hit drynkes myn herte deþ me tene.

Ich have loved al þis er þat y may love namore,
Ich have siked moni syk lemmon for þin ore.
Me nis love never þe ner ant þat me reweþ sore.
Suete lemmon þench on me—ich have loved þe ore.

Suete lemmon y preye þe of love one speche,
Whil y lyve in world so wyde oþer nulle y seche.
Wiþ þy love my suete leof mi blis þou mihtes eche,
A suete cos of þy mouþ mihte be my leche.

Suete lemmon y preȝe þe of a love bene
ȝef þou me lovest ase men says lemmon as y wene,
Ant ȝef hit þi wille be þou loke þat hit be sene,
So muchel y þenke upon þe þat al y waxe grene.

Bituene Lyncolne ant Lyndeseye, Norhamptoun ant Lounde,
Ne wot y non so fayr a may as y go fore ybounde.
Suete lemmon ypreȝe þe þou lovie me a stounde!
Y wole mone my song
On wham þat hit ys on ylong.

When the nightingale sings,
The trees grow green,
Leaf and grass and blossom springs,
In April, I suppose;
And love has to my heart gone
With a spear so keen,
Night and day my blood it drains
My heart to death it aches.

I have loved all this past year
So that I may love no more;
I have sighed many a sigh,
Beloved, for thy pity,
My love is never thee nearer,
And that me grieveth sore;
Sweet loved-one, think on me,
I have loved thee long.

Sweet loved-one, I pray thee,
For one loving speech;
While I live in this wide world
None other will I seek.
With thy love, my sweet beloved,
My bliss though mightest increase;
A sweet kiss of thy mouth
Might be my cure.

Sweet beloved, I pray thee
For a love token:
If thou lovest me, as men do say,
Beloved, as I think,
And if it be thy will,
Make sure that others see;
So much I think upon thee
That I do grow all pale.

Between Lincoln and Lindsey,
Northampton and London,
I know no maiden so fair
As the one I'm in bondage to.
Sweet loved-one, I pray thee
Thou love me for a while;
I will moan my song
To the one on whom it is based.

== See also ==
- Cultural depictions of the nightingale
- Middle English literature
