= Ich am of Irlaunde =

14th-century Middle English dance song

"Ich am of Irlaunde", sometimes known as "The Irish Dancer", is a short anonymous Middle English dance-song, possibly fragmentary, dating from the early 14th century, in which an Irish woman issues an invitation to come and daunce wit me in Irlaunde. The original music for this song is now lost. It is historically important as being the earliest documented reference to Irish dance. "Ich am of Irlaunde" is well-known as the source of W. B. Yeats's poem "I Am of Ireland", and it was itself included in The Oxford Book of English Verse, The Norton Anthology of English Literature and The Longman Anthology of British Literature.

== Text ==
Ich am of Irlaunde,
And of the holy londe
Of Irlande.
Gode sire, pray ich thee,
For of sainte charite,
Come and daunce wit me
In Irlaunde.

== Transmission ==
The poem survives in only one manuscript, Bodleian Library Rawlinson D.913, which was bequeathed to the library in 1755 by the antiquarian bibliophile Richard Rawlinson. Bound into this manuscript is a strip of vellum, eleven inches by four inches, on which are written about a dozen poems including "Ich am of Irlaunde", "Hay! Robyne, Malkin", and the well-known lyric "Maiden in the mor lay".

"Ich am of Irlaunde" was first published by the German academic Wilhelm Heuser in 1907 in the academic journal Anglia, but came to wider attention when Kenneth Sisam included it in his 1921 anthology Fourteenth Century Verse & Prose, and still more when it was adapted by W. B. Yeats (see below).

== Composition ==
The name of the poet is unknown, but the poem dates from the early 14th century. Opinions differ as to the dialect of the poem, and hence the place where it might be presumed to have been written. It has been identified as an Irish English poem, or again as the work of a poet in England writing in southern English dialect.

== Criticism ==
"Ich am of Irlaunde" has been described as "problematic", "mysterious", "enigmatic", and as having a "a magic that tantalizes". In part, the mystery may stem from the fact that the surviving lines are by some scholars considered to be no more than a fragment of a poem now otherwise lost. Critics are generally agreed that they form the lyric of a dance-song, or perhaps some kind of dramatic performance. Dance-songs, or carols, were divided into the refrain (the first three lines of this poem), which were sung by the dancers as they danced in a ring, and the verse (the remaining four lines) sung by a soloist. "Ireland", it has been proposed, may have been simply a name for the centre of the dance-floor where the soloist stood. Some critics have suggested that the phrase holy londe might imply a Celtic Otherworld, and that the song was used in a May or Midsummer dance deriving ultimately from the rites of a pre-Christian Nature religion. Such dances were, perhaps, "the ritual which unites male and female, and in so doing unites the everyday, secular space of here and now with the sacred elsewhere". On the other hand the holy londe of Irlande could be a reminder that Ireland is famous for its "saints and scholars", while phrases like sainte charite, and even come and daunce wit me, are perhaps interpretable in terms of Christian allegory. As an expression of Christian love the dancer's overt invitation to dance with her could represent a covert one to marry her.

== Influence ==
W. B. Yeats's poem "I Am of Ireland", written in August 1929 and collected in his Words for Music, Perhaps, and Other Poems (1932), is based on the Middle English poem, which had been read aloud to him by Frank O'Connor, possibly from St John Seymour's Anglo-Irish Literature 1200–1582. Yeats expands on the original poem, giving it a contemporary political theme of appeal to idealism.

The Canadian-born American poet John Malcolm Brinnin's "Ich Am of Irlaunde" was published in The New Yorker in 1956. The poem begins:

Where sea gulls, holy-ghosting rainbows, ran
With the weather on the piebald landfall lea,
I came to Ireland, an Irishman,
To dress a grave for saynte charité...

The Fijian-Australian poet Sudesh Mishra included, in his poem-sequence "Feejee", an adaptation of "Ich am of Irlaunde" presenting the racial tensions between native Fijian and Indo-Fijian in the aftermath of the 1987 coups:

I am of Feejee,
the bitter land of Feejee,
and hate is all we know, cried she.
Leap down that mango tree
and dance with me
in this bitter land of Feejee.

== Settings ==
Though it is believed that "Ich am of Irlaunde" was originally sung, the music that it was sung to has not survived. The Irish choral group Anúna performed their own setting of this poem on their album Invocation.
