= A wayle whyt ase whalles bon =

Middle English lyric poem

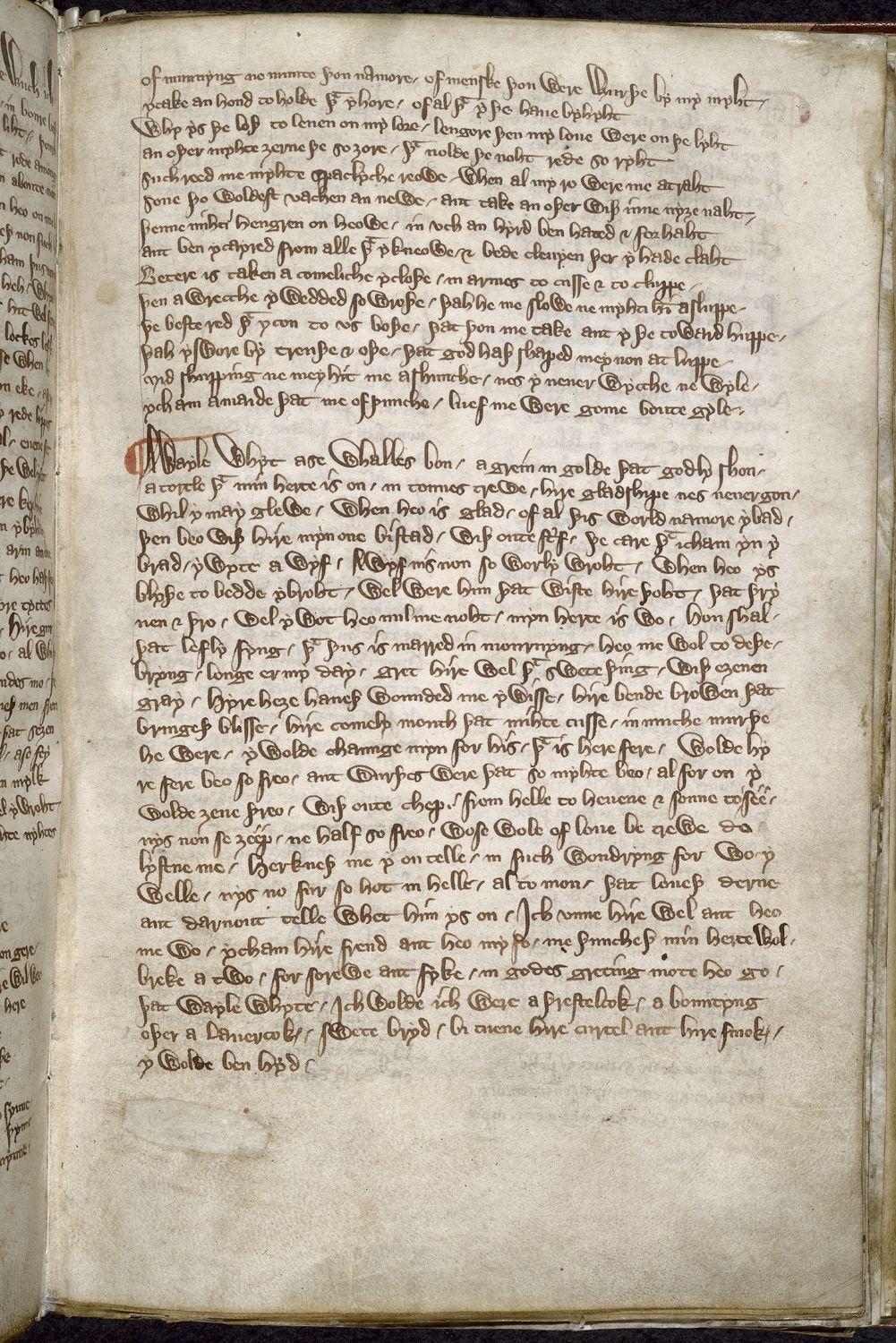
- Text contains the second part of Most I ryden by Rybbesdale, and the start of A wayle whyt as whalles bon
- Written: late-13th or early-14th century
- Language: Middle English

"A wayle whyt ase whalles bon" ('A beauty white as whale's bone'), also titled after the opening of its refrain "Ich wolde ich were a threstelcok" ('I wish I were a throstle-cock'), is an anonymous late-13th or early-14th century Middle English lyric poem. The text forms part of the collection known as the Harley Lyrics (MS. Harley 2253, f. 67r).

== Summary ==
The persona praises, and carnally desires, a beautiful woman (wayle; lit. 'selection' or 'preference') who is very white (as 'whale's bone').

== See also ==
- Ambergris
- Baleen

== Sources ==
- Fein, Susanna Greer, ed. (2014). "Art. 36, A wayle whyt ase whalles bon: Introduction". The Complete Harley 2253 Manuscript. TEAMS Middle English Texts. Vol. 2 (online ed.). Kalamazoo, MI: Medieval Institute Publications.
