= Nottingham Youth Orchestra =

The Nottingham Youth Orchestra is a youth orchestra that was founded in 1985 by Derek Williams and the late Stephen Fairlie. The main aim of the orchestra is to promote the musical development of young local musicians in full time education. The orchestra has gained a reputation for its high standards of performance and has received praise and acclaim both in the UK and on tours abroad.

Over the past 20 years, NYO has expanded from just one orchestra to three classical orchestras and two jazz orchestras. These groups involve over 300 young players aged 8 to 19, representing some 50 schools in Nottinghamshire and other parts of the East Midlands. All of the orchestras are coached by experienced local professional musicians, who support all the sections of the orchestras in their musical development. The members are given the opportunity to play a wide range of orchestral and chamber music, as well as film scores and traditional folk songs. Following Derek Williams' retirement the senior orchestra now has the benefit of experienced visiting conductors, including the organisation's Artistic Advisor, James Lowe.

There are at least three major Youth Orchestra concerts in the Nottingham area each year, typically including venues such as the Royal Concert Hall, Southwell Minster, St Mary's church and the Albert Hall. The senior orchestra also undertakes a summer tour, often to Europe. Recent destinations have included Florence, Vienna, Barcelona, Berlin, Paris and Antwerp. In the past the orchestra has toured places as far afield as the United States and Cyprus.

The orchestra has commissioned work by various composers and performed the world premieres of 'Mosaic' by Nick Sackman at the Edinburgh International Festival in 2002 and 'The Death of Stalin' by Robert Steadman in March 2003 at Nottingham's Royal Concert Hall. It has also premiered a Jazz Violin Concerto by John Dankworth and has performed the Elgar Cello Concerto with Julian Lloyd Webber. At the Music for Youth National festival at the Royal Festival Hall in London in July 2003, the orchestra was highly commended for its performance.

The Nottingham Youth Jazz Orchestra (Notts NYJO) was formed in Spring 2008. NYJO is directed by Phil Smith and NYJO 2, a training band for NYJO, Is under the direction of Ben Lee, who also tutors an 8-piece combo. All the bands perform gigs and concerts locally, with a varied repertoire of jazz and popular tunes. Every summer NYJO spends a week performing in Edinburgh during the Fringe Festival. Its patron is the internationally regarded Tony Kofi, a jazz saxophonist and band leader who hails from Nottingham.

== See also ==
- List of youth orchestras
