= Nicholas Sackman =

English classical composer

Nicholas Sackman (born 12 April 1950) is an English classical composer.

== Education ==
Sackman studied composition at the University of Nottingham, completed his MA at the University of Leeds with the composer Alexander Goehr in 1974, and was subsequently awarded a Doctorate of Music from the University of Nottingham in 1996.

== Early performances ==
During this time he had many performances both in the United Kingdom and further afield with Ensembles and Cadenzas performed at the BBC Young Composers Forum and the Gaudeamus Festival, A Pair of Wings at the Bath Music Fest and the 1974 ISCM Festival, Paraphrase, premiered by the London Sinfonietta, the String Quartet no. 2 and his Piano Sonata, written for Peter Lawson.

Following his study he became a Head of Music in secondary schools in London and then Hertfordshire, which led to a number of commissions for amateur orchestral players including Mosaic for the Nottingham Youth Orchestra, Cecilia dances for the Hertfordshire County Youth Orchestra, and sets of pieces for young performers entitled Folios.

== University of Nottingham ==
In 1990 he was awarded a composition lectureship at the University of Nottingham. Following his appointment Sackman has received numerous commissions including his magnus orchestral work Hawthorn commissioned by the BBC, premiered at the 1993 Proms, and released by NMC Recordings, Vivace for Sinfonia ViVA, Meld for Philip Mead and the RNCM Brass Ensemble, a percussion quartet entitled Puppets for Drumstruck, and more recently Concerto in Black for the Birmingham Contemporary Music Group. He was commissioned, along with 100 other British composers, to write the song Maiden in the Moor for the recently released NMC Songbook (winner of a 2009 Gramophone award), and many recordings of his works appear on the Metier label. His works have been performed across the UK, including at the Leeds Festival, the Bath Festival, Royal Festival Hall, Queen Elizabeth Hall, Purcell Room, St John's Smith Square, Royal Albert Hall, and the Edinburgh Festival, as well as in France, Belgium, Switzerland, Luxembourg, Sweden and America. A recording of his recent Concertino for violin and orchestra will shortly be released on the Parma label, and his first Violin Sonata, written for Ruth Palmer was premiered in March 2010.

== Reputation ==
Sackman has asserted a "direct and uncompromising musical voice – one in which cogent argument and powerful fantasy are realized in strikingly memorable forms." Similarly, when reworking pre-existing music he adapts it into his own highly individualistic contemporary idiom to the extent that the quotation appears inevitable.
