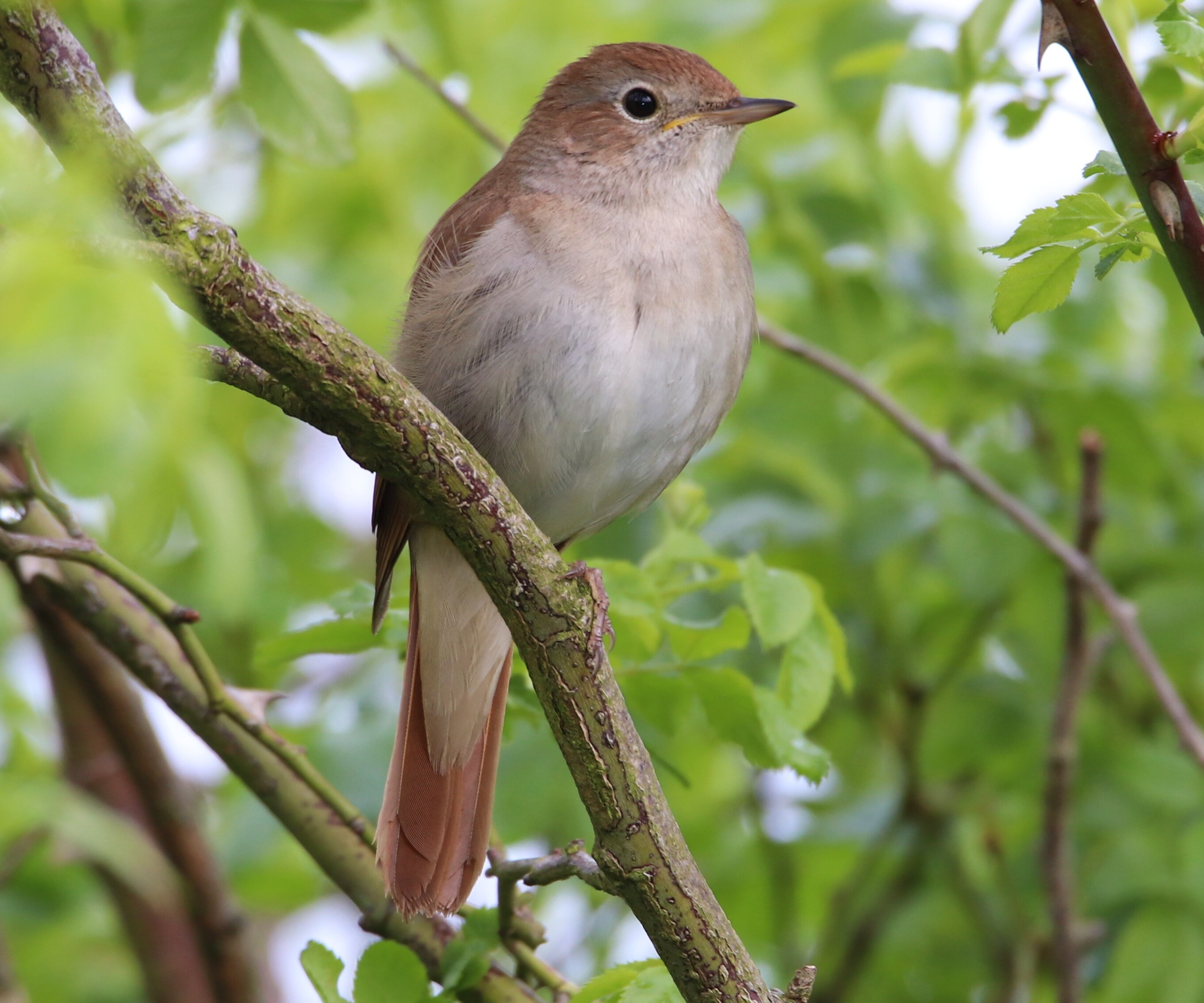

Conservation status
- Least Concern (IUCN 3.1)

Scientific classification
- Kingdom: Animalia
- Phylum: Chordata
- Class: Aves
- Order: Passeriformes
- Family: Muscicapidae
- Genus: Luscinia
- Species: L. megarhynchos

Binomial name
- Luscinia megarhynchos Brehm, 1831
- Range of L. megarhynchos Breeding Non-breeding

Synonyms
- Luscinia aedon Forster, 1817

Audio
- Song

= Common nightingale =

Species of bird

The common nightingale, rufous nightingale or simply nightingale (Luscinia megarhynchos), is a small passerine bird which is known for its powerful and beautiful song, often described as one of the most beautiful sounds in nature. An Old World flycatcher, it belongs to a group of more terrestrial species, often called chats. Its range partly overlaps with that of the more northerly thrush nightingale (Luscinia luscinia), a closely related species with which hybrids have occurred.

== Taxonomy ==
The common nightingale belongs to a distinctive group of Old World flycatchers, known as chats, that were formerly thought to be thrushes. Genetic analysis showed that they were in fact types of flycatcher (Muscicapidae), with the resemblance to thrushes being the result of convergent evolution. "Nightingale" is derived from "night" and the Old English galan, "to sing". The genus name Luscinia is Latin for "nightingale" and megarhynchos is from Ancient Greek megas, "great" and rhunkhos, "bill".

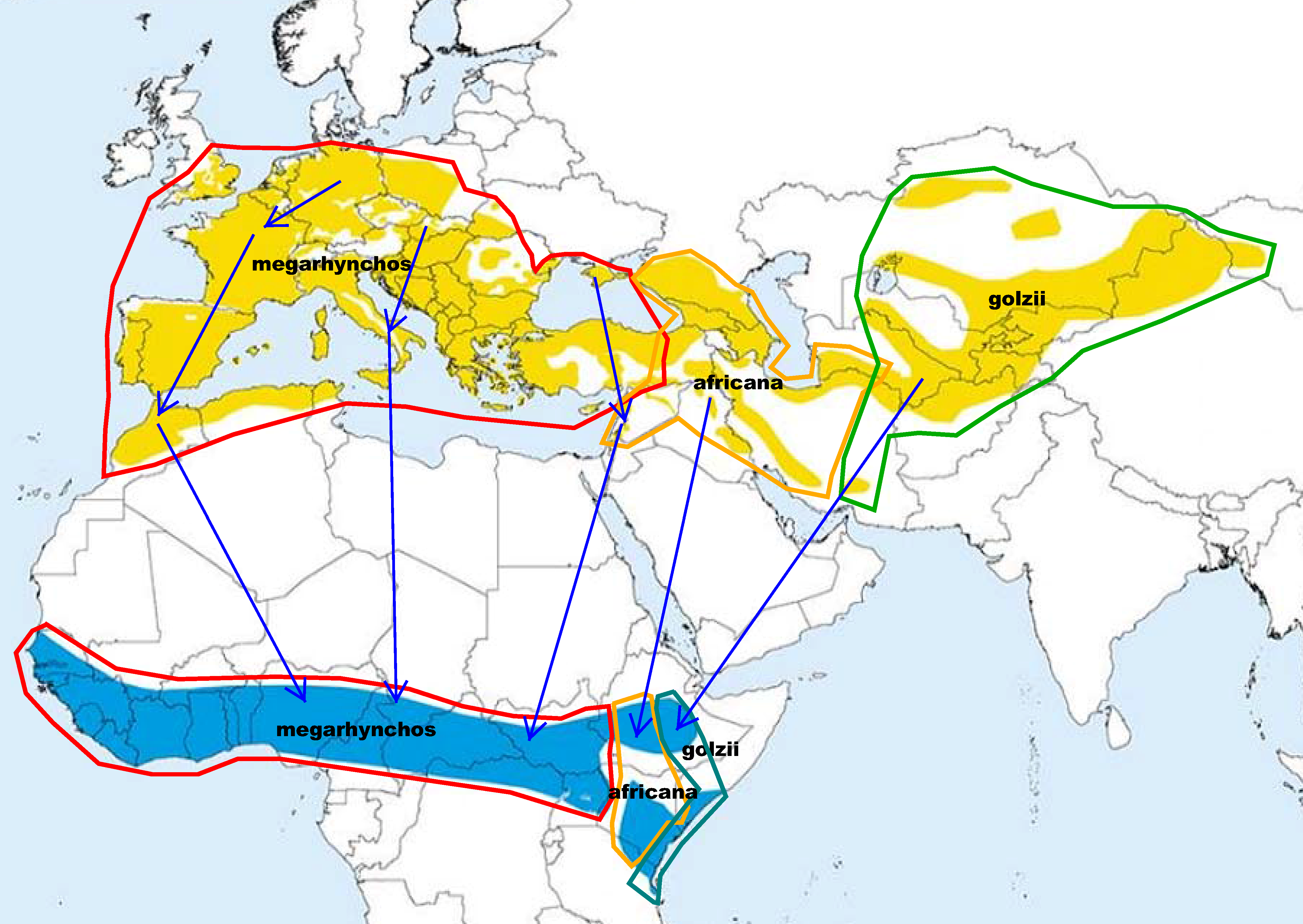
Distribution map of subspecies

Three subspecies are recognised:

- Western nightingale (L. m. megarhynchos) – western Europe, North Africa and Asia Minor, wintering in tropical Africa
- Caucasian nightingale (L. m. africana) – the Caucasus and eastern Turkey to southwestern Iran and Iraq, wintering in East Africa
- Eastern nightingale (L. m. golzii) – the Aral Sea to Mongolia, wintering in coastal East Africa

== Description ==
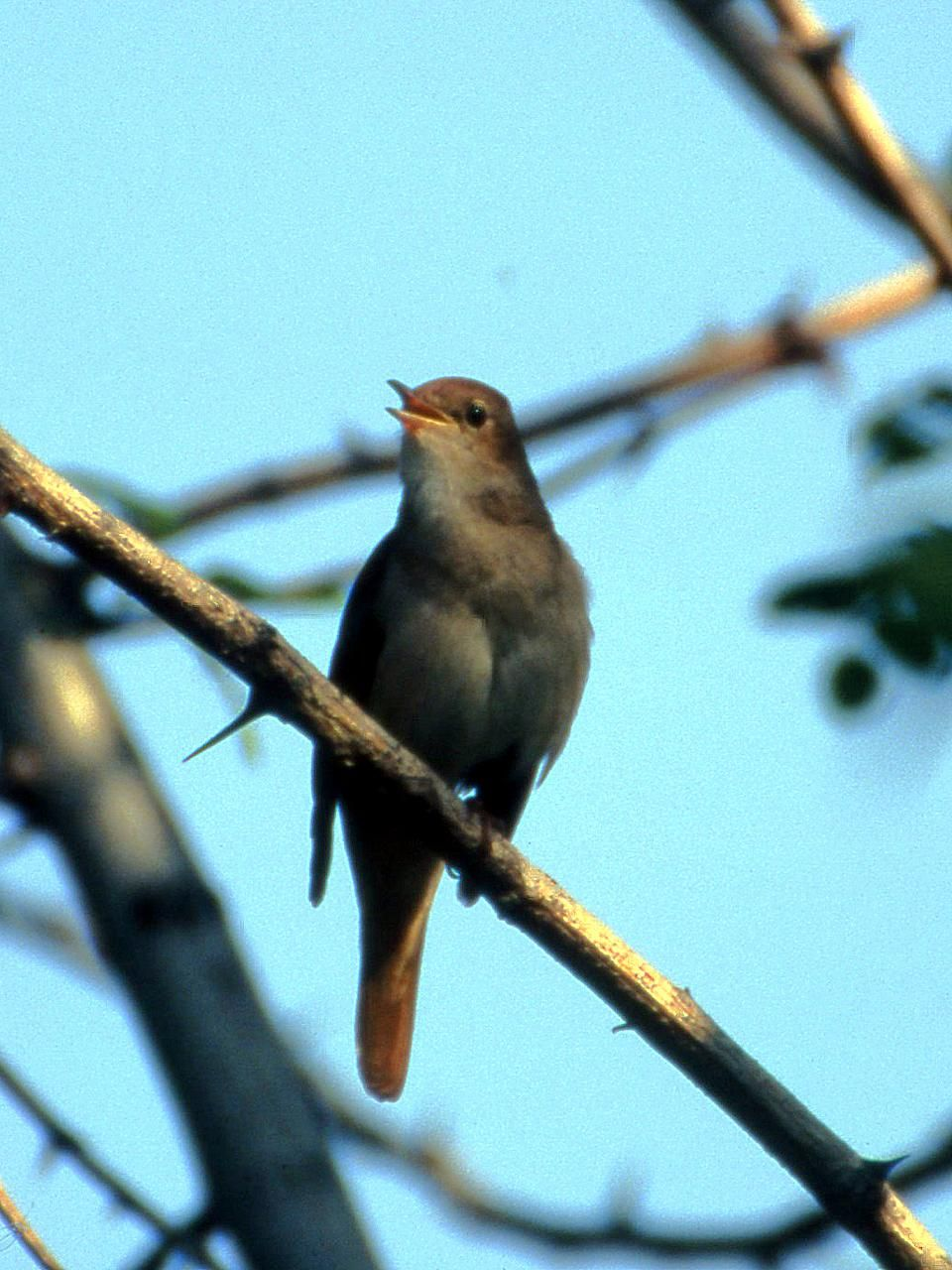
Male

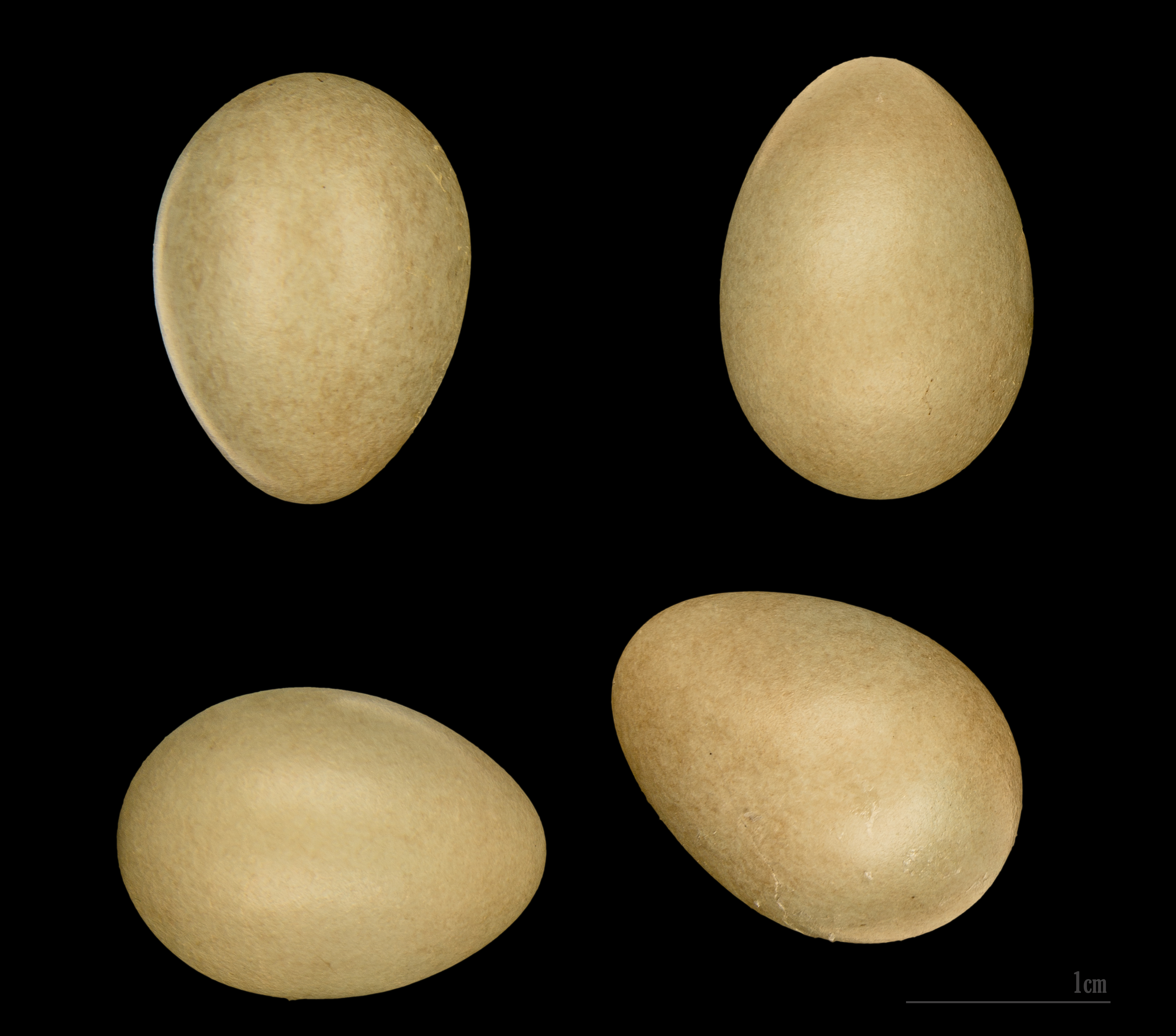
Luscinia megarhynchos eggs

The common nightingale is slightly larger than the European robin, at 15–16.5 cm (5.9–6.5 in) length. It is plain brown above except for the reddish tail. It is buff to white below. The sexes are similar. The eastern subspecies (L. m. golzi) and the Caucasian subspecies (L. m. africana) have paler upper parts and a stronger face-pattern, including a pale supercilium. The song of the male nightingale has been described as one of the most beautiful sounds in nature, inspiring songs, fairy tales, opera, books, and a great deal of poetry. However, historically most people were not aware that female nightingales do not sing.

Song recorded in Devon, England

== Distribution and habitat ==
It is a migratory insectivorous species breeding in forest and scrub in Europe and the Palearctic, and wintering in Sub-Saharan Africa. It is not found naturally in the Americas. The distribution is more southerly than the very closely related thrush nightingale (Luscinia luscinia). It nests on or near the ground in dense vegetation. Research in Germany found that favoured breeding habitat of nightingales was defined by a number of geographical factors.

- less than 400 m (1,300 ft) above mean sea level
- mean air temperature during the growing season above 14 °C (57 °F)
- more than 20 days/year on which temperatures exceed 25 °C (77 °F)
- annual precipitation less than 750 millimetres (30 in)
- aridity index lower than 0.35
- no closed canopy

In the U.K., the bird is at the northern limit of its range which has contracted in recent years, placing it on the red list for conservation. Despite local efforts to safeguard its favoured coppice and scrub habitat, numbers fell by 53 percent between 1995 and 2008. A survey conducted by the British Trust for Ornithology in 2012 and 2013 recorded some 3,300 territories, with most of these clustered in a few counties in South East England and East Anglia, notably Kent, Essex, Suffolk, and East and West Sussex.

By contrast, the European breeding population is estimated at between 3.2 and 7 million pairs, giving it green conservation status (least concern).

== Behaviour and ecology ==
Nightingales are so named because they frequently sing at night as well as during the day. The name has been used for more than 1,000 years, being highly recognisable even in its Old English form nihtegale, which means "night songstress". Early writers assumed the female sang when it is in fact the male. The song is loud, with an impressive range of whistles, trills and gurgles. The male nightingales can produce a variable number of distinct song types whereas different individual birds can sing the same song type with minor variations (between them, or from rendition to rendition), resulting in extraordinarily large song repertoires (on average 190 with a maximum of 250 different song types, exceptional males can exceed 300). A research by Proceedings of the National Academy of Sciences notes that common nightingales have a very large syllable repertoire, reported at about 1,160 syllables, versus 108 for the blackbird and 341 for the skylark.

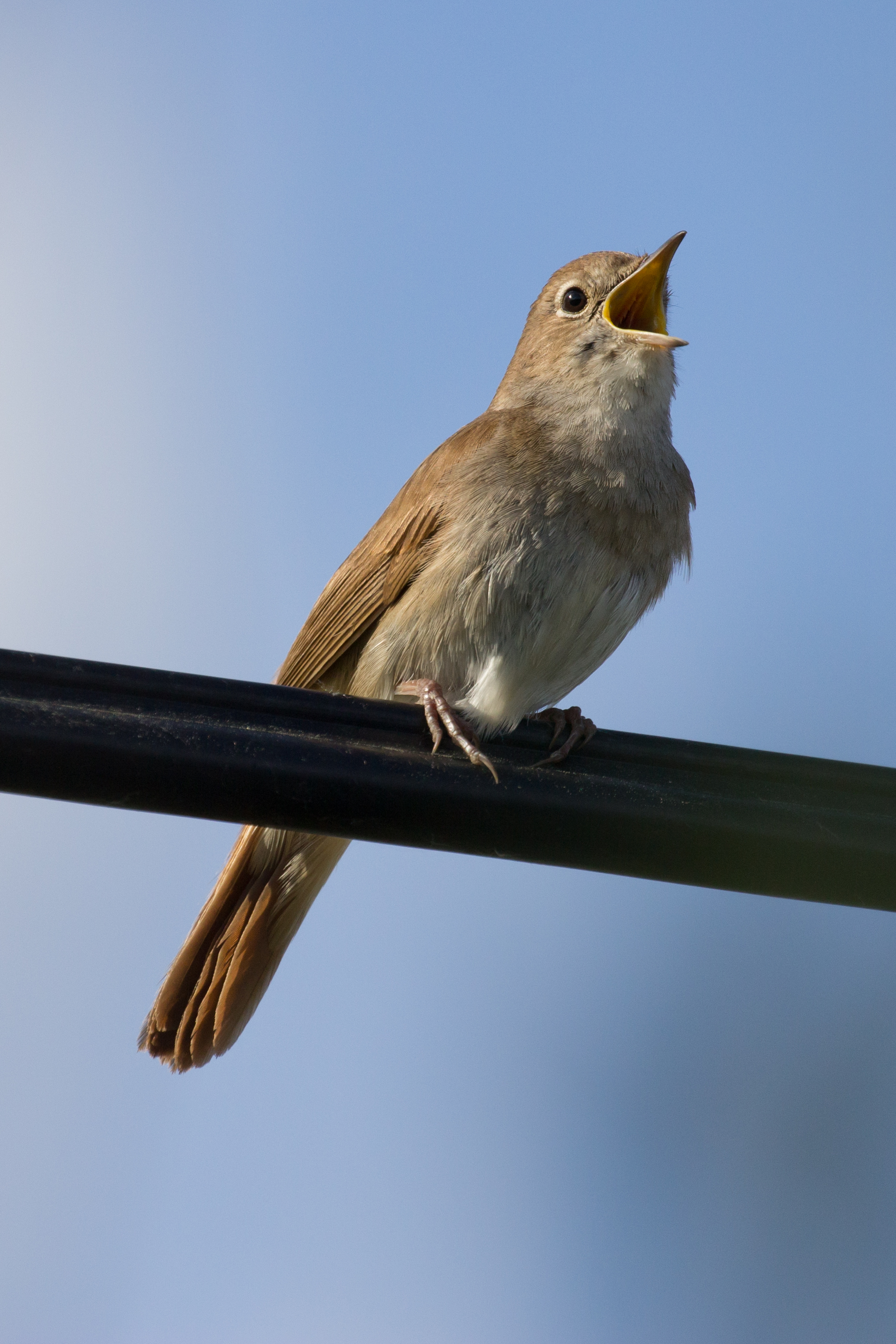
A male singing.

Nightingales are generally considered elusive and secretive birds, spending much of their time hidden in dense shrubs, thickets, and undergrowth, avoiding open areas and human activity. They often remain motionless when they sense a potential threat, making them difficult to spot. Even males, which sing loudly to attract mates and defend territories, usually do so from concealed perches rather than exposed branches. Its song is particularly noticeable at night because few other birds are singing. This is why its name includes "night" in several languages. Only unpaired males sing regularly at night, and nocturnal song probably serves to attract a mate. Singing at dawn, during the hour before sunrise, is assumed to be important in defending the bird's territory. Night-long singing sessions can last roughly 7 to 8 hours without major breaks. Nightingales sing even more loudly in urban or near-urban environments, in order to overcome the background noise. The most characteristic feature of the song is a loud whistling crescendo that is absent from the song of its close relative, the thrush nightingale (Luscinia luscinia). It has a frog-like alarm call.

The bird is a host of the acanthocephalan intestinal parasite Apororhynchus silesiacus.

== Cultural connotations ==
The common nightingale is an important symbol for poets from a variety of ages, and has taken on a number of symbolic connotations. In Odyssey, Homer evokes Aëdon, the nightingale who killed her son Itylus, suggesting the myth of Philomela and Procne (one of whom, depending on the version of the myth, is turned into a nightingale). This myth is the focus of the Sophocles tragedy, Tereus, of which only fragments remain. Ovid, too, in his Metamorphoses, includes the most popular version of this myth, imitated and altered by later poets, including Chrétien de Troyes, Geoffrey Chaucer, John Gower, and George Gascoigne. T. S. Eliot's "The Waste Land" also evokes the common nightingale's song and the myth of Philomela and Procne. Because of the violence associated with the myth, the nightingale's song was long interpreted as a lament.

The common nightingale has also been used as a symbol of poets or their poetry. Poets chose the nightingale as a symbol because of its creative and seemingly spontaneous song. Aristophanes (The Birds) and Callimachus both evoke the bird's song as a form of poetry. Virgil compares the mourning of Orpheus to the "lament of the nightingale".

In Sonnet 102, Shakespeare compares his love poetry to the song of the common nightingale (Philomel):

Our love was new, and then but in the spring,
When I was wont to greet it with my lays;
As Philomel in summer's front doth sing,
And stops his pipe in growth of riper days:

During the Romantic era, the bird's symbolism changed once more: poets viewed the nightingale not only as a poet in its own right, but as "master of a superior art that could inspire the human poet". For some romantic poets, the nightingale even began to take on qualities of the muse. The nightingale has a long history with symbolic associations ranging from "creativity, the muse, nature's purity, and, in Western spiritual tradition, virtue and goodness". Coleridge and Wordsworth saw the nightingale more as an instance of natural poetic creation: the nightingale became a voice of nature. In "Ode to a Nightingale", John Keats pictures the nightingale as an idealised poet who has achieved the poetry that Keats longs to write. Invoking a similar conception of the nightingale, Shelley wrote in his "A Defence of Poetry":

A poet is a nightingale who sits in darkness and sings to cheer its own solitude with sweet sounds; his auditors are as men entranced by the melody of an unseen musician, who feel that they are moved and softened, yet know not whence or why.

In Ukrainian literature and poetry, the nightingale frequently serves as a poetic motif, symbolising romantic encounters as well as longing and melancholy. The bird's song is perceived as a profound expression of the human soul, touching hearts and stirring emotions. One legend tells how nightingales once only lived in India, when one nightingale visited Ukraine. Hearing sad songs from the people, the nightingale sang its song to cheer them up. The people responded with happy songs, and since then, nightingales have visited Ukraine every spring to hear Ukrainian songs. National poet Taras Shevchenko observed that "even the memory of the nightingale's song makes man happy". In one of Shevchenko's poems, "A cherry orchard by the house", the nightingale becomes an integral part of the peaceful summer scenery in a Ukrainian village:

Beside the house, the mother lulls
The little children for the night,
Then she, too, settles at their side.
And all is still… Only the girls
And nightingales disturb the quiet.

The nightingale is the official national bird of Iran. It is an enduring symbol in Persian poetry, music, and literature, often representing love, longing, and beauty. In medieval Persian literature, the nightingale's enjoyable song made it a symbol of the lover who is eloquent, passionate, and doomed to love in vain. In Persian poetry, the object of the nightingale's affections is the rose, which embodies both the perfection of earthly beauty and the arrogance of that perfection.

== Cultural depictions ==
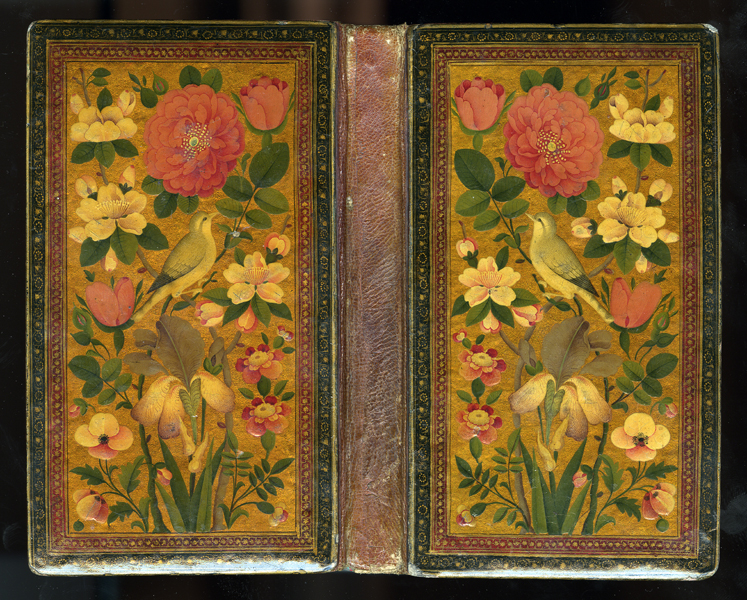
Nightingale and rose in Persian art, 19th century. The metaphorical relationship of the nightingale (active lover) and flower (passive beloved) frequently used in Persian poetry.

- The Aēdōn (Ancient Greek: Ἀηδών, "Nightingale") is a minor character in Aristophanes's 414 BC Attic comedy The Birds.
- Philomela is transformed into a nightingale, according to Metamorphoses (book VI) of Ovid.
- The love of the nightingale (a conventional cultural substitution for the Persian bulbul) for the rose is widely used as a metaphor for the poet's love for the beloved and the worshiper's love for God in classical Persian, Urdu and Turkish poetry.
- "The Owl and the Nightingale" (12th or 13th century) is a Middle English poem about an argument between these two birds.
- "When The Nightingale Sings" is a Middle English love poem, extolling the beauty and lost love of an unknown maiden.
- "Laüstic", a lai by French poet Marie de France from High Middle Ages (1100–1300)
- John Milton's sonnet "To the Nightingale" (1632–33) contrasts the symbolism of the nightingale as a bird for lovers, with the cuckoo as the bird that called when wives were unfaithful to (or "cuckolded") their husbands.
- Samuel Taylor Coleridge's "The Nightingale: A Conversation Poem", printed in 1798, disputes the traditional idea that nightingales are connected to the idea of melancholy.
- Ludwig van Beethoven's Symphony No. 6 (1808), the "Pastoral Symphony", includes in its second movement flute imitations of nightingale calls.
- A nightingale (called by its French name rossignol) features prominently in the French folk song À la claire fontaine
- Franz Liszt featured the nightingale's song in the Mephisto Waltzes No. 1.
- John Keats's "Ode to a Nightingale" (1819) was described by Edmund Clarence Stedman as "one of our shorter English lyrics that still seems to me ... the nearest to perfection, the one I would surrender last of all" and by Algernon Charles Swinburne as "one of the final masterpieces of human work in all time and for all ages".
- The beauty of the nightingale's song is a theme in Hans Christian Andersen's story "The Nightingale" from 1843.
- A recording of nightingale song is included, as directed by the score, in "The Pines of Janiculum", the third movement of Ottorino Respighi's 1924 symphonic poem Pines of Rome (Pini di Roma).
- Igor Stravinsky based his first opera, The Nightingale (1914), on the Hans Christian Andersen story and later prepared a symphonic poem, The Song of the Nightingale (1917), using music from the opera.
- In 1915, Joseph Lamb wrote a rag called "Ragtime Nightingale" that was intended to imitate the nightingale calls.
- "A Nightingale Sang in Berkeley Square" (1939) was one of the most popular songs in Britain during World War II. In 2004, the song was featured in an episode of series 2 of the Channel 4 sitcom Peep Show and in 2019, it featured as the closing song of the Amazon/BBC miniseries Good Omens.
  - Both Terry Pratchett and Neil Gaiman's novel Good Omens and the aforementioned miniseries adaptation joke that "while they were eating, for the first time ever, a nightingale (sang/actually did sing) in Berkeley Square. Nobody heard it over the noise of the traffic, but it was there, right enough".
- In the works of J. R. R. Tolkien, nightingales are closely associated with the characters Lúthien Tinúviel and her mother, Melian.
- A nightingale is depicted on the reverse of the Croatian 1 kuna coin, minted between 1993 and 2009.
- In Chapter 13 of Mary Shelley's Frankenstein, the monster compares Safie's singing voice to that of a "nightingale in the woods".
- Manfred Mann's Earth Band's sixth album, 1975's Nightingales & Bombers, took its title from a World War II naturalist's recording of a nightingale singing in a garden as warplanes flew overhead. The recording is featured in a song on the album.
- The song of the nightingale is one of the main elements in the 2019 single "Let Nature Sing".
- A night fighting variant of the Arado Ar 234 Blitz was named Nachtigall (nightingale).

=== In the Baha'i Faith ===
The nightingale is used symbolically in the Baha'i Faith to represent the founder Baha'u'llah. Baha'is utilise this metaphor to convey how Baha'u'llah's writings are of beautiful quality, much like how the nightingale's singing is revered for its beautiful quality in Persian music and literature.

Nightingales are mentioned in much of Baha'u'llah's works, including the Tablet of Ahmad, The Seven Valleys, The Hidden Words, and the untranslated Tablet of the Nightingale and the Owl.
