= Harley Lyrics =

14th-century medieval manuscript

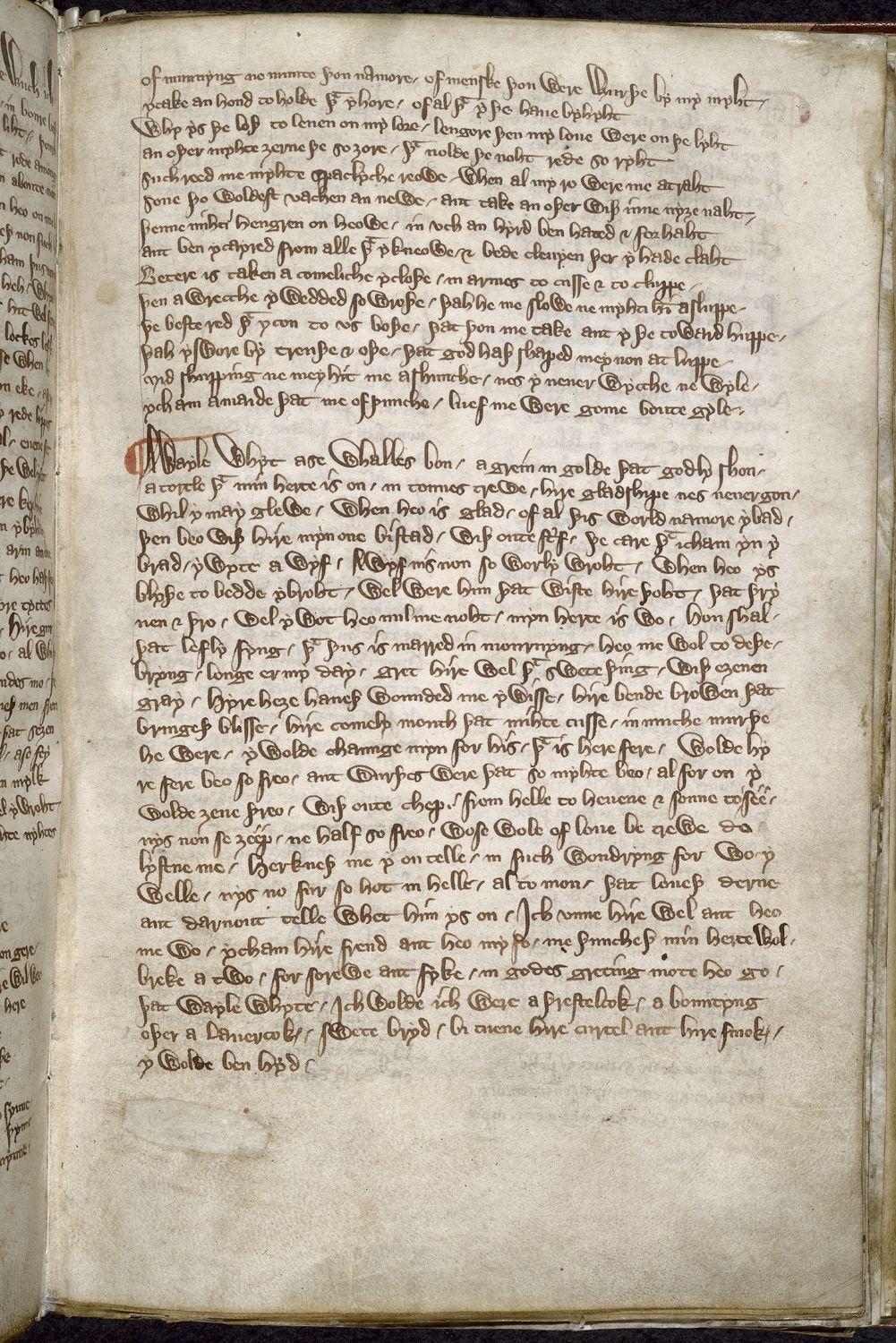
Folio 67r of the Harley MS, which includes the second part of Mosti ryden by Rybbesdale, and the start of A wayle whyt as whalles bon.

The Harley Lyrics is the usual name for a collection of lyrics in Middle English, Anglo Norman (Middle French), and Latin found in Harley MS 2253, a manuscript dated ca. 1340 in the British Library's Harleian Collection. The lyrics contain "both religious and secular material, in prose and verse and in a wide variety of genres." The manuscript is written in three recognisable hands: scribe A, scribe B or the Ludlow scribe, and scribe C.

== The manuscript ==
Harley MS 2253 contains 141 leaves of parchment or folios measuring 11 1/2 by 6 1/2 inches. It can be divided into two parts based on content: the first 48 leaves, booklets one (quires 1-2, folios 1-22) and two (quires 3-4, folios 23-48), contain religious poetry in the late-thirteenth century hand known as scribe A, whilst the remaining five booklets are written in the early-fourteenth century hand of the Ludlow scribe; apart from some pigment recipes at the beginning of booklet three (quires 5, folios 49-52) penned by scribe C. Containing miscellaneous material, secular as well as religious, in prose and verse, this division is not, however, reflected in the quire division, since the division is found on folio 49, part of a quire running from folio 47 to 52; an earlier assumption that this division indicated two separate manuscripts bound together is therefore incorrect.

== The Ludlow scribe ==
Nothing is known about the identities of scribes A and C, however in discussing scribe B Fein informs us that "Much has been written about the Ludlow scribe, especially since Carter Revard’s landmark research that dates his hand as it appears in three manuscripts and forty-one legal writs." The Ludlow scribe like a number of others is, because of the lack of evidence and the distance of time, somewhat anonymous yet their 'hands' (their characteristic writing style) makes them recognizable. "As the maker of a key manuscript, the Ludlow scribe is a leading figure among a growing company of copyists now recognized for the value of what they preserved." There is evidence that this scribe "flourished as a professional legal scribe in the vicinity of Ludlow from 1314 to 1349." Those aforementioned forty-one legal writs are dated from December 18, 1314, to April 13, 1349. Fein notes that "If he was in his twenties when he inscribed the first of these documents, then he was born in the last decade of the thirteenth century. He may have died during the Black Death, which swept through England from 1348 to 1350, so his dates can roughly be set from about 1290 to about 1350."

== The metanarrative ==
Revard explains that "...a savvy reader of the whole anthology can see that there is a metanarrative that unifies the anthology." he further explains that a metanarrative works by, what has been called, "oppositional thematics". That is to say that, each text in the collection is deliberately placed such that it opposes or speaks to the narrative or viewpoint of the preceding texts or texts. In booklet three though, we can see that there is not always a clear relationship and that a knowledge of the sources used by the scribe to set up such oppositions is required to fully grasp the inter-textual meaning. The two poems which precede scribe C's recipes, are ABC a femmes and De l’Yver et de l’Esté, both are Anglo-Norman or Middle French. They appear to have nothing in particular to say to each other. The former is a text that celebrates women, highlighting their decency, kindness and long suffering natures. Fein observes that the poem “…deftly equates the sexual pleasure women hold for men with the heavenly delight, healing, and salvation ushered in by Mary’s role in God’s incarnation.” The writer asserts that any man who does not appreciate the worthiness of women is a base creature. The latter however is a Debate poem "...a late medieval form that might have been inspired by and modeled on Virgil’s Eclogues." It concerns an argument between the Summer and the Winter that seems to have almost pagan overtones. The actual relationship of these texts can only be guessed at.

The texts in booklet four however are more clearly related. By virtue of the number of texts it contains, it represents far more complex contextual patterns and references. However it begins with Hagiography, a Saint's Life. Incipit vita sancti Ethelberti, tells the story of St Ethelbert, who begins as a King but ends as martyr, he is killed as a consequence of his honourable and virtuous behaviour in spite of a vision which shows his future murder. Further into the booklet we meet another apparently honourable and virtuous figure in the earliest surviving English serventes, "...that is, a poem made to mock a beaten enemy." Sitteth alle stille ant herkneth to me also called A Song of Lewes, tells the story of the Earl of Leicester, Simon de Montfort, a hero of the Second Barons' War and how he achieved a great victory against the forces of the King at the Battle of Lewes on 14 May 1264. The text which follows, Chaunter m’estoit, describes his death at the Battle of Evesham, August 4, 1265 where he was killed and dismembered. In this Anglo Norman text de Montfort is eulogised as a martyr and compared favourably to Thomas Becket. Fein tells us that this last text was an expression of a desire by some to see Simon de Montfort canonised, a desire that never bore fruit. The relationship between these three texts is interesting, as is their relationship to the text which follows three short texts concerned with the brevity of life. Fein writes "Looking beyond the praise of Montfort, one senses, too, how the scribe wishes to issue a warning on earthly pride:" In Lystneth, lordynges! A newe song Ichulle bigynne, Sir Simon Fraser, who has also opposed his King along with William Wallace and Robert the Bruce has been captured and is sent to London to be hanged, then drawn and quartered. "The tone of the piece is vigorously nationalistic and anti-Scots." The parallels are clear, as Fein illustrates "The scribe’s interesting arrangement of material conveys many messages in itself. The trilingual meditation on mortality (arts. 24a, 24a*, 24b) points forward to this poem of public execution as well as backward to the death in battle of Simon de Montfort, who was also dismembered." Thus the French Simon de Montfort is compared to another traitor the Scottish Sir Simon Fraser and to a true martyr and saint, the Anglo Saxon Ethelbert; thus creating the metanarrative of booklet four.

== Modern transcriptions ==
G. L. Brook is considered an authority on this manuscript. He first published The Harley Lyrics: The Middle English Lyrics of MS. Harley 2253 in 1948 and released a second edition containing "minor corrections and revised bibliography" in 1956. His edition includes a detailed introduction including information on the physicality and orthography of the manuscript, context on secular, courtly love, and religious lyrics, the metre of lyrics, and a brief discussion on the lyrics as literature. His edition includes thirty-two of the original lyric verses included in Harley MS 2253.

== Table of contents of Harley manuscript 2253 ==
| BOOKLET 1 (quires 1–2, Scribe A) | | | | |
| Text | Folios | Language | Original Title | English Title |
| 1. 1a. | 1ra-21vb 21vb-22ra | AN Verse AN Verse | Vitas patrum Thais | The Lives of the Fathers The Story of Thais |
| BOOKLET 2 (quires 3–4, Scribe A) | | | | |
| 2. 3. 3a. 3b. 4. 5. 6. 7. | 23ra–33va 33va–39rb 39rb 39va–41va 41va–43vb 43vb–45vb 45vb–47vb 47vb–48vb | AN verse AN prose AN prose AN prose AN prose AN prose AN prose AN prose | Herman de Valenciennes, La Passioun Nostre Seignour De la Passioun Jhesu [L’Évangile de Nicodème] Epistle a Tiberie Epistle a Claudie l’emperour De seint Johan le Ewangeliste De seint Johan le Baptist De seint Bartholomeu Passioun seint Piere | Herman de Valenciennes, The Passion of Our Lord The Gospel of Nicodemus The Letter of Pilate to Tiberias The Letter of Pilate to Emperor Claudius The Life of Saint John the Evangelist The Life of Saint John the Baptist The Life of Saint Bartholomew The Passion of Saint Peter |
| BOOKLET 3 (quire 5, Scribes B and C) | | | | |
| 8. 9. 10. 11. 12. 13. 14. 15. 16. 17. | 49r–50v 51ra–52va 52va 52va 52vb 52vb 52vb 52vb 52vb 52vb | AN verse AN verse ME prose ME prose ME prose ME prose ME prose ME prose ME prose ME prose | ABC a femmes De l’Yver et de l’Esté Vorte make cynople Vorte temprene asure Vorte make gras-grene Vorte maken another maner grene Yet for gaude-grene Vorte couche selverfoyl Vorte maken iren as hart as stel Vorte maken blankplum | ABC of Women Debate between Winter and Summer How to Make Red Vermilion How to Temper Azure How to Make Grass-Green How to Make Another Kind of Green Another for Yellow-Green How to Apply Silverfoil How to Make Iron as Hard as Steel How to Make White Lead |
| BOOKLET 4 (quire 6, Scribe B) | | | | |
| 18. 19. 20. 21. 22. 23. 24. 24a. 24a*. 24b. 25. 25a. 26. 27. | 53ra–54vb 54vb 55ra–b 55va–56vb 57r–58v 58v–59r 59r–v 59v 59v 59v 59v–61v 61v 61v–62v 62v | L prose L verse AN verse ME verse ME verse ME verse AN verse AN verse L verse ME verse ME verse ME verse AN verse ME verse | Incipit vita sancti Ethelberti Anima christi, sanctifica me Quant voy la revenue d’yver Alle herkneth to me nou In a thestri stude Y stod Sitteth alle stille ant herkneth to me Chaunter m’estoit Charnel amour est folie Momentaneum est quod delectat Erthe toc of erthe Lystneth, lordynges! A newe song Ichulle bigynne Lord that lenest us lyf Enseignement sur les amis Middelerd for mon wes mad | The Life of Saint Ethelbert Soul of Christ, Sanctify Me A Goliard’s Feast Harrowing of Hell Debate between Body and Soul A Song of Lewes Lament for Simon de Montfort Carnal Love Is Folly What Allures Is Momentary Earth upon Earth The Execution of Sir Simon Fraser On the Follies of Fashion Lesson for True Lovers The Three Foes of Man |
| BOOKLET 5 (quires 7–11, Scribe B) | | | | |
| 28. 29. 30. 31. 32. 33. 34. 35. 36. 37. 38. 39. 40. 41. 43. 44. 45. 46. 47. 48. 49. 50. 51. 52. 53. 54. 55. 56. 57. 58. 59. 60. 61. 62. 63. 64. 65. 66. 67. 68. 69. 70. 71. 72. | 63r–v 63v 63v 64r 64va–65vb 66r 66v 66v–67r 67r 67va–68va 68va–70rb 70rb–v 70va/71ra/71va 70vb/71rb 71va 71vb–72ra 72ra–va 72va–73rb 73r–v 73v–74v 75ra–b 75rb–va 75va–b 75vb 76r 76r 76r 76v–77r 77va 77vb–78va 78vb–79rb 79rb–vb 79vb 80ra 80rb 80v 80v–81r 81r–v 81va–b 82ra–83r 83r 83r–92v 92v–105r 105va–b | ME verse ME verse ME verse ME verse ME verse ME verse ME verse ME verse ME verse AN verse AN prose AN prose ME verse ME verse ME verse ME verse ME verse ME verse ME verse ME verse AN verse ME verse ME verse ME verse ME verse AN verse Trilingual verse AN verse AN verse ME verse AN verse ME verse ME verse ME verse ME verse ME verse ME verse ME verse ME verse ME verse AN & ME verse ME verse AN prose L prose | Ichot a burde in a bour ase beryl so bryht / Annot and John Bytuene Mersh ant Averil / Alysoun With longyng Y am lad Ich herde men upo mold Herketh hideward ant beoth stille Weping haveth myn wonges wet Most I ryden by Rybbesdale In a fryht as Y con fare fremede A wayle whyt ase whalles bon Gilote e Johane Les pelrinages communes que crestiensfountenaSeinteTerre Les pardouns de Acres Ne mai no lewed lued libben in londe Of a mon Matheu thohte Lenten ys come with love to toune In May hit murgeth when hit dawes Heye Louerd, thou here my bone Ichot a burde in boure bryht Alle that beoth of huerte trewe Lustneth, lordinges, bothe yonge ant olde Marie, pur toun enfaunt Suete Jesu, king of blysse Jesu Crist, heovene kyng Wynter wakeneth al my care When Y se blosmes springe Ferroy chaunsoun Dum ludis floribus Quant fu en ma juvente Marie, mere al Salveour Dulcis Jesu memoria Une petite parole Stond wel, moder, under rode Jesu, for thi muchele miht I syke when Y singe Nou skrinketh rose ant lylie-flour My deth Y love, my lyf Ich hate When the nyhtegale singes Blessed be thou, Levedy Ase Y me rod this ender day Herkne to my ron Mayden, moder milde The Geste of Kyng Horn Ludlow Scribe, Estoyres de la Bible Nomina librorum bibliotece | Annot and John Alysoun The Lover’s Complaint Song of the Husbandman The Life of Saint Marina The Poet’s Repentance The Fair Maid of Ribblesdale The Meeting in the Wood A Beauty White as Whale Bone Gilote and Johane Pilgrimages in the Holy Land The Pardons of Acre Satire on the Consistory Court The Laborers in the Vineyard Spring Advice to Women An Old Man’s Prayer Blow, Northern Wind The Death of Edward I The Flemish Insurrection The Joys of Our Lady Sweet Jesus, King of Bliss Jesus Christ, Heaven’s King A Winter Song A Spring Song on the Passion I Pray to God and Saint Thomas While You Play in Flowers Song on Jesus’ Precious Blood Mary, Mother of the Savior Jesus, Sweet Is the Love of You Sermon on God’s Sacrifice and Judgment Stand Well, Mother, under Rood Jesus, by Your Great Might I Sigh When I Sing An Autumn Song The Clerk and the Girl When the Nightingale Sings Blessed Are You, Lady The Five Joys of the Virgin Maximian Maiden, Mother Mild King Horn Ludlow Scribe, Old Testament Stories Names of the Books of the Bible |
| BOOKLET 6 (quires 12–14, Scribe B) | | | | |
| 73 74 75 75a. 76 77 78 79. 80. 81. 82. 83. 84. 85. 86. 87. 88. 89. 90. 91. 92. 93. 94. 95. 96. 97. 98. 99. | 106r 106ra–107rb 107va–109vb 110ra–va 110vb–111rb 111rb–vb 112ra–b 112rc–113vc 113vb–114v 114v–115r 115va–117ra 117ra–118rb 118rb–vb 119ra–121ra 121ra–122va 122vb–124va 124va–125r 125ra–127ra 127rb–va 127va–b 128r 128r–v 128v–129v 129v–130v 131r 131v–132r 132r–133r 133v | ME verse ME verse AN verse AN verse AN verse AN verse AN verse AN verse AN verse ME verse AN verse AN verse AN verse ME verse AN verse AN verse ME verse ME verse ME prose AN prose ME verse ME verse AN prose AN prose AN prose L prose L prose AN & L prose | God that al this myhtes may Lustneth, alle, a lutel throwe Le jongleur d’Ely e le roi d’Angleterre Les trois dames qui troverunt un vit Le dit des femmes Le blasme des femmes Nicholas Bozon, Femmes a la pye Un sage honme de grant valour / Urbain the Courteous Talent me prent de rymer e de geste fere / Trailbaston Mon in the mone stond ant strit Le chevaler e la corbaylle De mal mariage La gagure, ou L’esquier e la chaunbrere A bok of swevenyng Ordre de bel ayse Le chevaler qui fist les cons parler Of rybauds Y ryme ant red o my rolle Mon that wol of wysdam heren When man as mad a kyng of a capped man La destinccioun de la estature Jesu Crist Nostre Seigneur Lutel wot hit any mon hou love hym haveth ybounde Lutel wot hit any mon hou derne love may stonde Enseignements de saint Lewis a Philip soun fitz L’enqueste que le patriarche de Jerusalem fist Les armes des roys Scriptum quod peregrini deferunt Legenda de sancto Etfrido, presbitero de Leoministria Quy chescun jour de bon cuer cest oreisoun dirra | God Who Wields All This Might The Sayings of Saint Bernard The Jongleur of Ely and the King of England The Three Ladies Who Found a Prick The Song on Women The Blame of Women Nicholas Bozon, Women and Magpies Urbain the Courteous Trailbaston The Man in the Moon The Knight and the Basket Against Marriage The Wager, or The Squire and the Chambermaid A Book of Dreaming The Order of Fair Ease The Knight Who Made Vaginas Talk Satire on the Retinues of the Great Hending The Prophecy of Thomas of Erceldoune Distinguishing Features of the Bodily Form of Jesus Christ Our Lord The Way of Christ’s Love The Way of Woman’s Love The Teachings of Saint Louis to His Son Philip The Land of the Saracens Heraldic Arms of Kings Letter for Pilgrims on the Relics at Oviedo The Legend of Saint Etfrid, Priest of Leominster Prayer for Protection |
| BOOKLET 7 (quire 15, Scribe B) | | | | |
| 100. 101. 102. 103. 104. 105. 106. 107. 108. 108a. 109. 109a. 110. 111. 112. 113. 114. 115. 116. | 134r 134r 134v 134v 134v–135r 135r 135r 135r 135v 135v 135v–136r 136r 136r–v 136v–137r 137r 137r–v 137v–138v 138v–140r 140v | AN prose AN prose AN verse L prose AN verse & prose L prose AN prose AN prose AN prose AN prose L prose AN prose L prose AN prose L prose L prose AN & L verse AN prose L prose | Quant vous levez le matyn Quy velt que Dieu sovyegne de ly Gloria in excelsis Deo en fraunceis Confiteor tibi, Deus, omnia peccata mea Gloriouse Dame Rex seculorum et Domine dominator Um doit plus volentiers juner le vendredy Quy est en tristour Cely que fra ces messes chaunter Je vous requer, Jaspar, Melchior, e Baltazar Mundus iste totus quoddam scaccarium est Quy chescun jour denz seissaunte jours Contra inimicos si quos habes Seint Hillere archevesque de Peyters ordina ces salmes Eulotropia et celidonia De interrogandi moribundis beati Anselmi Dieu, roy de magesté Contemplacioun de la passioun Jesu Crist De martirio sancti Wistani | Occasions for Angels Occasions for Psalms in AN Glory to God in the Highest in AN Prayer of Confession Prayer on the Five Joys of Our Lady Prayer for Contrition Reasons for Fasting on Friday Seven Masses to Be Said in Misfortune Seven Masses in Honor of God and Saint Giles Prayer to the Three Kings All the World’s a Chess Board Three Prayers That Never Fail Occasions for Psalms in L Occasions for Psalms Ordained by Saint Hilary of Poitiers Heliotrope and Celandine Saint Anselm’s Questions to the Dying Against the King’s Taxes Seven Hours of the Passion of Jesus Christ The Martyrdom of Saint Wistan |
L = Latin AN = Anglo Norman (Middle French) ME = Middle English
