= Foweles in the frith =

Foweles in the frith is a short, five-line Middle English poem. It is found in a manuscript from the thirteenth century (Douce 139) containing mostly legal writings, and is accompanied by a musical score for two voices.

The poem, which features both rhyme and alliteration, is one of a relatively small number of lyric poems from that century, and the only one with music. It is not entirely clear whether the poem is complete, or just the refrain of a longer poem: there are no other poems in the manuscript that provide any context. While it may well be a secular love song, there is no consensus on whether it is secular or religious.

== Text ==
Foweles in the frith,
The fisses in the flod,
And I mon waxe wod.
Sulch sorw I walke with
For beste of bon and blod.

== Interpretations ==
According to Thomas Moser, most critics until the 1960s read the poem as a secular love poem, reading the last two lines as "I walk with much sorrow because of a woman who is the best of bone and blood". But then more allegorical readings were proposed, specifically by Edmund Reiss, who provided a religious reading for the poem, with a focus on the word "beste" in the last line: an Old Testament-inspired meaning sees "beste" as "beast", meaning that humankind after the Fall of man suffers "sulch sorw", and a New Testament-reading pointing to Christ as the "best of living beings". Reiss's religious interpretation was convincing to James I. Wimsatt, but not to John Huber or to R. T. Davies, who found it unbelievable. Moser sees the beast/best reference as a pun. In Middle English, both could be written as "best": Modern English "best" was earlier written as "betst" but had lost the medial -t- by the thirteenth century; Modern English "beast" was [beste] in Middle English, pronounced /best/ with a long vowel, but scribes did not usually mark vowel length. In other words, both words could easily be spelled identically in the thirteenth century.

Reiss saw another dual meaning in the word "wod", in the third line, usually read as the Middle English word for "mad". It also, Reiss argues, continues the list of natural environments listed in the first two lines--"frith" ("forest, game preserve") and "flod" ("flood"). Reiss sees that series also in the first nouns of these three lines: "fowles", "fisses", and "I". "Wod", however, in its double meaning, indicates man's estrangement from nature after the Fall. R. T. Davies was not impressed with Reiss's reading of "wod".

Thomas Moser details the various Old and New Testament readings at length. The Old Testament reading, which is mostly concerned with Creation and fallen man's role in it, hinges on the multiple uses of "fish and fowl" in scripture (the words do not occur together in the New Testament), which typically indicate "the totality of the created world". A New Testament reading can take the imagery of spring, a frequent occurrence in Middle English religious poetry, as a reference to Easter. In that reading, which has plenty of complications, the "foweles" might be a reference to Christ's words in the "Foxes have holes" passage of Matthew 8:18–20. In the end, however, Moser contends that nothing should stand in the way of a purely secular reading: the "nature opening" is conventional for love poems, as is the reference to "blood and bone" in love poetry, which Moser points out occurs also in "The Fair Maid of Ribblesdale" and in "Blow Northern Wind" (both in the Harley Lyrics).

Stephanie Thumpsen Lundeen argues that the poem resembles "The Clerk and the Girl", a secular love poem from the Harley Lyrics, where the speaker, in love and miserable, also fears going mad.

== Musical score and performances ==
The poem is one of eight medieval lyrics that comprise Benjamin Britten's Sacred and Profane (1975).
