= Reverdie =

The reverdie is an old French poetic genre, which celebrates the arrival of spring. Literally, it means "re-greening". Often the poet will encounter Spring, symbolized by a beautiful woman.

Originating in the troubadour ballads of the early Middle Ages, reverdies were very popular during the time of Chaucer. English examples from that era include Sumer is icumen in and Lenten ys come with love to toune. T. S. Eliot's The Waste Land and William Carlos Williams' Spring and All are both considered to be modern examples of the genre.

The reverdie forms the basis of the Irish aisling, in which the speaker meets Ireland lamenting her woes.
