= Richard Leighton Greene =

American literary scholar and musicologist

Richard Leighton Greene (18 January 1904 – 23 December 1983) was an American literary scholar and musicologist.

Born in Rochester, New York on 18 January 1904, Greene attended the University of Rochester, graduating with an AB in 1926; he then studied at Princeton University, completing an AM in 1927 and a PhD in English in 1929.

Greene joined the teaching faculty at the University of Rochester in 1929 and was promoted to a full professorship 1937 and to the Gilmore Professorship of English in 1942. In 1946, he moved to Wells College and served as its president until 1950. He then spent four years holding visiting professorships at Purdue University, the University of California at Berkeley and the California Institute of Technology. In 1954, he joined the faculty at Wesleyan University as a visiting professor; he was appointed to a full professorship in 1956 and to the Wilbur Fisk Osborne Professorship of English in 1969. He retired in 1972. He was a specialist in medieval English carols; his books included The Early English Carols and A Selection of English Carols. He died on 23 December 1983, aged 79.
