= Mirie it is while sumer ilast =

Middle English song from the 13th century

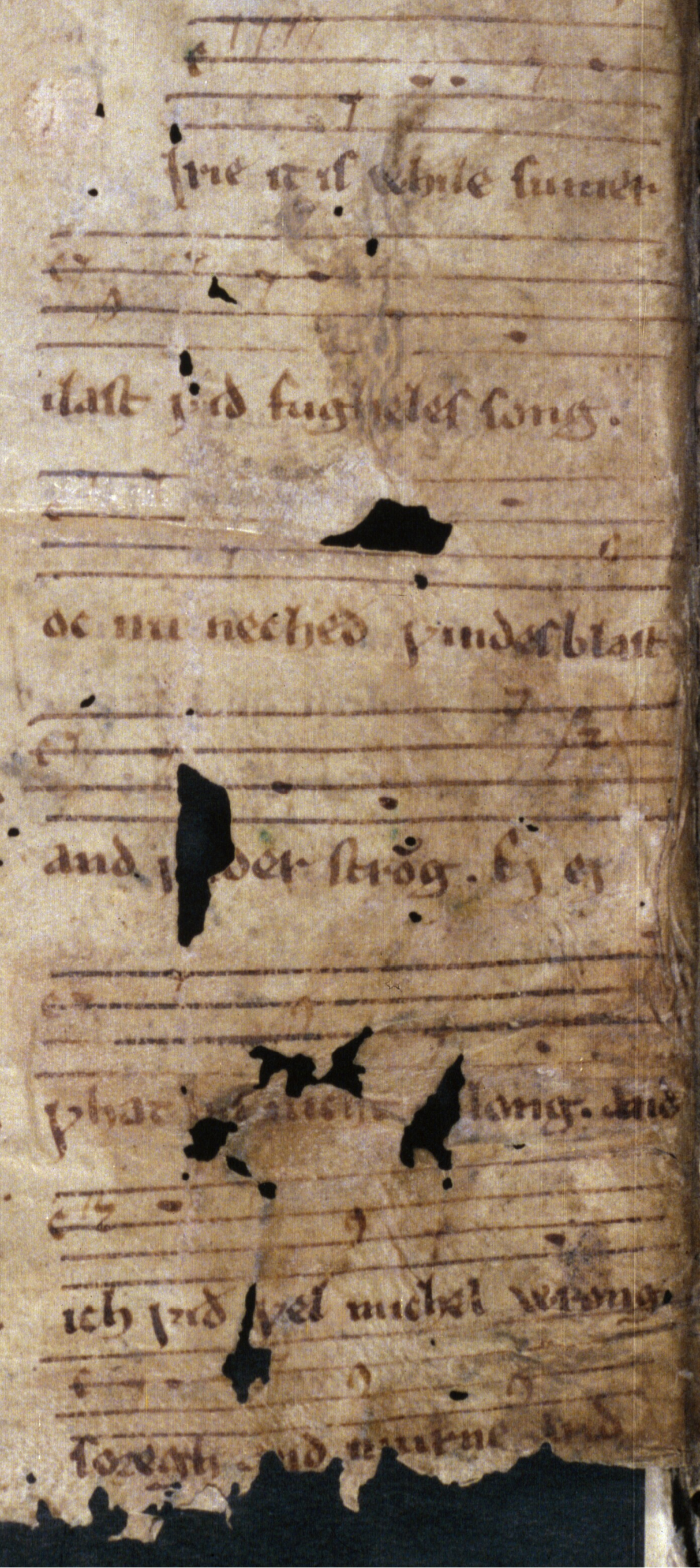
The surviving manuscript copy of "Mirie it is while sumer ilast"

"Mirie it is while sumer ilast" ("Merry it is while summer lasts") is a Middle English song from the first half of the 13th century. It is about the longing for summer in the face of the approaching cold weather. It is one of the oldest songs in the English language, and one of the few examples of non-liturgical music from medieval England. The manuscript was found together with two old French songs in a book of Psalms in the Bodleian Library. It was rediscovered at the end of the 19th century and made accessible to experts in 1901. It was arranged and published in a modern form for the first time by Frank Llewellyn Harrison.

The text and melody are incomplete on a single, damaged manuscript page, which, together with the somewhat ambiguous notation, makes it difficult to reconstruct the song in whole. It is unclear whether the song originally contained additional lines or stanzas, which Harrison considers probable, nor can the final word be conclusively determined. The author of the song is also unknown, although by its inclusion with two other French love songs pasted in a Book of Psalms, Nicholson proposes that the manuscript was written by a lay chorister. The context of the piece also may suggest the surviving leaf was originally included in a French chansonnier, suggesting an origin in the French tradition.

== History ==
"Mirie it is while sumer ilast" is only known from a single source. It is found on a parchment page together with two contemporary pieces of Old French music. It was subsequently incorporated as an endpaper in a book of Psalms from the second half of the 12th century. The book may have originally come from the Benedictine Abbey of Thorney near Peterborough in eastern England. This is indicated by the mention of Saints Benedict, Botolph and Æthelthryth in the litany contained in the Psalter. Botolph's bones were kept as a relic in Thorney, while Æthelthryth was considered the patron saint of the Isle of Ely. The book and the bound manuscript came into the holdings of the Bodleian Library at Oxford University in 1755 through the collection of the antiquarian Richard Rawlinson. There it is cataloged under the signature MS Rawlinson G. 22.

=== Localization and dating ===
At least the age of the manuscript can be deduced from other evidence. Neume notation, for example, was replaced by modal and mensural notation in England around the middle of the 13th century. Based on linguistic features, the manuscript with "Mirie it is" dated to the first half of the 13th century and is located in the dialect area of the Midlands. This localization is based, among other things.

== Words ==
There is some disagreement on the last word - the word "fast" was suggested by the editors of Early Bodleian Music and approved of by Dobson and Harrison, but its proper form is "faste" with a pronounced final "e", so it does not rhyme correctly. More recently, composer Graham Lack suggested "wast", which Ian Pittaway uses in his analysis and reconstruction, noting:

Graham Lack’s suggestion of the Middle English wast rhymes correctly and had a variety of meanings, depending on context: enfeeblement or weakened emaciation; or futility; or uncultivated, barren land, i.e. wasteland.

Middle English

[M]irie it is while sumer ilast
ƿið fugheles song.
oc nu necheð ƿindes blast
and ƿ[ed]er strong.
Ey ey ƿhat þis nicht [is] long.
And ich ƿið ƿel michel wrong
soregh and murne and [fast/wast].

Modern spelling

Mirie it is while sumer ilast
With fugheles song.
Oc nu necheth windes blast
And weder strong.
Ey, ey! What this nicht is long.
And ich with wel michel wrong
soregh and murne and [fast/wast].

A few Modern English translations have been made; in his article, Pittaway provides a literal translation, and in his video reconstruction, one that scans with the melody.

Modern English

Merry it is while summer lasts
With birds’s song.
But now nears the wind’s blast
And weather strong.
Oh, oh! How this night is long!
And I with very much wrong
Sorrow and mourn and fast.

Modern English (Pittaway 2025, literal)

Merry it is while summer lasts
with birdsong
but now, close by, the winds blast
and the weather is powerful.
Oh, oh, I exclaim, this night is long
And I am done much wrong.
Sorrow and mourn and go without food.

Modern English (Pittaway 2025, poetic)

Merry it is while the summer it lasts
with sweet birds' song.
Oh but now the cold wind blasts,
it blows so strong.
Oh, oh, but this night is long.
And it does to me much wrong,
sorrow and dement and waste away.

== Melody ==
=== Transliteration of surviving original ===
The original is incomplete and, in parts, unclear. What follows is one attempt to bring the existing manuscript into modern notation. Regarding this reconstruction, its author says this:

Some note values are best guesses, since some shapes are indistinct and, because the handwriting is inconsistent, it is unclear whether some lines are marks on the page or part of the note. These marks have been taken as part of the note. Bar lines represent the end of a line in the original manuscript and rests represent holes in the page where notes are missing. Longs are written as crotchets and breves as quavers. Quavers are written single or grouped according to whether they are single or grouped in the original notation.

=== Reconstruction ===
Here is one scholarly reconstruction of the full tune by the same scholar who wrote the above transliteration, but with a lot more adjustments based on the other works in the manuscript and medieval music theory, among other things:

== See also ==
- Sumer is icumen in, another 13th century medieval English song on a related theme.
