= Middle English lyric =

Genre of English literature

Middle English lyric a genre of English literature, is characterized by its brevity and emotional expression. Conventionally, the lyric expresses "a moment," usually spoken or performed in the first person. Although some lyrics have narratives, the plots are usually simple to emphasize an occasional, common experience. Even though lyrics appear individual and personal, they are not "original"; instead, lyrics express a common state of mind. Those states of mind are wide in range. Some deal with religious topics pertaining to Jesus or the Virgin Mary, focusing on Christ's sacrifice and salvation, or Mary's roles as a mother and intercessor. Other religious topics focus on Adam and the Fall, or the necessity of faith. Others are secular, focusing on ale, women, and the simple joys of life. Some are sarcastic, satiric, humorous, or even crude.

== Origins ==
Middle English lyrics are almost impossible to date accurately. These lyrical traditions could have already been old when they were written down. Since they are thought to have been passed down orally, dating it is complicated further, as we don't know for how long they had been orally in existence. Scholars believe that the oldest lyric could have dated from as far back as the 12th century, and the newest dating from the 15th century. Other scholars believe that the lyric could have originated from France, as some of the translations closely mirror the French versions. They also draw this conclusion from the comical genres of the secular lyrics: those of good drink and good lovers.

== Audience ==
Middle English lyrics were meant to be heard, not read. Keeping in mind an aural audience, the lyric is usually structured with poetic devices: an obvious rhyme scheme, internal rhyme, wordplay, allegory, refrain, and sometimes musical effects. The rhyme scheme primarily functions as a mnemonic device for the audience. The Refrain, however, has several critical functions. The Refrain gives the lyric unity and provides commentary (this is not unlike the bob and wheel found in Sir Gawain and the Green Knight). In addition to functioning thematically, the refrain encourages the audience to participate in singing the lyric. Finally, Musical Effects also encourage audience participation, and they take the form of rhythms and sounds (for example, onomatopoeia is not an uncommon trope employed). We do not know if they were set to music, but it could be possible, as several include music for accompaniment.

== Authorship ==
Most Middle English lyrics are anonymous. Because the lyrics reflect on a sort of "community property" of ideas, the concept of copyrighting a lyric to a particular author is usually inappropriate. Additionally, identifying authors is very difficult. Most lyrics are often un-dateable, and they appear in collections with no apparent organic unity. It is most likely many lyrics that survive today were widely recited in various forms before being written down. Evidence for this appears in a variety of Middle English poetry, especially Geoffrey Chaucer's The Canterbury Tales. Many of Chaucer's lines bear an uncanny resemblance to Middle English lyrics. Since these lyrics were written in a clear medieval Latin, scholars infer that these authors were likely clerics, familiar with other languages as well. Since the topics of the lyrics are secular, it is possible that the clerics were not writing the lyrics, but simply writing them down. It has also been inferred that the authors of these lyrics were primarily male. Some lyrics are written in a female voice, but it would be unlikely since those lyrics are written in a harsh satire against women.

== Survival ==
Middle English lyrics were not meant to be read or written down. Consequently, the few that survive are probably a very small sample of lyrics. Surviving lyrics appear in miscellanies, notably the Harley 2253 manuscript. The lyrics often appear with many other types of works, including writings in other languages.

== Bibliography ==
- Gray, Douglas (1972). Themes and Images in the Medieval English Religious Lyric. London, Boston: Routledge and K. Paul. ISBN 0-7100-7253-8.
- Manning, Stephen (1962). Wisdom and Number; Toward a Critical Appraisal of the Middle English Religious Lyric. Lincoln: University of Nebraska Press. LC PR365.M3.
- Reiss, Edmund (1972). The Art of the Middle English Lyric; Essays in Criticism. Athens: University of Georgia Press. ISBN 0-8203-0279-1.
- Speirs, John (1957). Medieval English Poetry: the Non-Chaucerian Tradition. London: Faber and Faber. LC PR311.S7.
- Oliver, Raymond (1970). Poems without Names; the English Lyric, 1200-1500. Berkeley: University of California Press. LC PR351.O5.
- Woolf, Rosemary (1968). The English Religious Lyric in the Middle Ages. Oxford: Clarendon Press. ISBN 0-19-811487-7.
- Black, Joseph (2011). "The Broadview Anthology of British Literature." Calgary: Broadview Press. ISBN 978-1-55481-048-2 (v. A.).
- W.W. Norton & Company (2014) "Middle English Lyrics." New York: W.W. Norton Press.
