= Geology of Yorkshire Dales National Park =

The geology of the Yorkshire Dales National Park in northern England largely consists of a sequence of sedimentary rocks of Ordovician to Permian age. The core area of the Yorkshire Dales is formed from a layer-cake of limestones, sandstones and mudstones laid down during the Carboniferous period. It is noted for its karst landscape which includes extensive areas of limestone pavement and large numbers of caves including Britain's longest cave network.

== Ordovician ==
The oldest rocks within the national park are a series of intensely folded silicate rocks of Ordovician age (485 - 444 Ma) collected together as the Ingleton Group. They are to be found in an inlier within the valley of the River Doe to the northeast of Ingleton. They are ascribed to the Arenig Series. A smaller outcrop of these same rocks is found a few miles further east at the northern end of the Austwick and Horton in Ribblesdale inlier beneath Horton itself.

== Silurian ==
Folded and faulted rocks of Silurian age (444 - 419 Ma) form the Howgill Fells in the northwest of the national park and give that area a character quite distinct from the rest of the Yorkshire Dales.

A suite of sandstones with siltstones and mudstones assigned to the Coniston Group form the bulk of the Howgills, including the 676m high summit known as The Calf, highest in the range. The lower part of this sequence is formed by the sandstones of the Wray Castle and Screes Gill formations which are found along the southeastern edge of this range. The Coniston Group rocks are overlain in turn by similar lithologies, identified as the Bannisdale and Kirkby Moor formations and assigned to the Kendal Group. Both groups of strata are of Ludlow age. The waterfall of Cautley Spout is formed where the waters of the Red Gill Beck plunge over cliffs of Coniston Group sandstones down onto those of the Screes Gill Formation.

Silurian rocks are also in evidence within the Austwick and Horton-in-Ribblesdale inlier.

== Devonian ==
A small area of ground extending northeast from Sedbergh to Dowbiggin is formed by the Sedbergh Conglomerate Formation which unconformably overlies the older Silurian strata. A faulted outcrop of the same formation is found extending from Kirkby Lonsdale to north of Barbon. The exact age of these rocks is uncertain but ranges from the late Devonian into the early Carboniferous. They have been assigned both to the Upper Old Red Sandstone Group and to the Ravenstonedale Group at different times.

An early Devonian intrusion of dolerite or microgabbro occurs at Bluecaster to the northwest of Cautley. Associated with it around the Rawthey valley are a number of felsitic dykes and sills; all are grouped by geologists within the ‘Lake District Minor Intrusion Suite’.

== Carboniferous ==
The larger part of the national park is formed in sedimentary rocks from the Carboniferous period (359 - 299 Ma). In stratigraphic sequence i.e. youngest at the top, the sequence consists of:

- Pennine Coal Measures Group
- Millstone Grit Group
- Yoredale Group (Asbian - Yeadonian)
  - Stainmore Formation
  - Alston Formation (inc Gayle Limestone & Hawes Limestone)
- Carboniferous Limestone Supergroup
  - Great Scar Limestone Group (Arundian-Brigantian)
    - Danny Bridge Limestone Formation (Asbian)
    - Garsdale Limestone Formation (Holkerian-Asbian)
    - Fawes Wood Limestone Formation
    - Ashfell Sandstone Formation
    - Tom Croft Limestone Formation

=== Carboniferous Limestone ===
The Great Scar Limestone Group is the key component of the limestone sequence.

=== Yoredale Group ===
The Carboniferous Limestone is overlain by a suite of rocks traditionally referred to as the Yoredale Series, and named from 'Yoredale' (an older name for Wensleydale), these are divided into an upper/younger Stainmore Formation and a lower/older Alston Formation.

=== Bowland High and Craven groups ===
In the south of the National Park, south of the Askrigg Block, strata of the Bowland High and Craven groups take the place of the Yoredale Group.

=== Millstone Grit ===
Overlying the Yoredale strata are sandstones belonging to the Millstone Grit Group. These form the upper parts of many of the hills within the national park such as Whernside, Pen-y-ghent, Great Whernside and Great Shunner Fell.

=== Coal Measures ===
The Ingleton Coalfield, one of the smallest in Britain, exploits a small outlier of late Carboniferous coal-bearing strata which extends along the southwestern boundary of the national park between Ingleton and Kirkby Lonsdale. These mudstones and siltstones with their associated coal seams are assigned to the Pennine Coal Measures Group though some Warwickshire Group strata may also be present.

== Permian ==
Early Permian age conglomerates and sandstones assigned to the Appleby Group overlie the Coal Measures strata near Ingleton. On the northeastern margin of the national park, the southernmost part of an outcrop of the aeolian Penrith Sandstone (also assigned to the Appleby Group) found through the Vale of Eden extends for a few hundred metres into the national park. It is associated at Nateby with a breccia known as the Stenkrith Brockram.

== Structure ==
The core area of the national park is a distinct structural unit within the Pennine chain; this is the Askrigg Block defined by the Craven Fault System in the southwest and the Dent Fault in the northwest.

== Quaternary ==
=== Glacial legacy ===
Drumlins are a particular feature on the margins of the park between Skipton and Long Preston in Ribblesdale and onward to Kirkby Lonsdale then north to Sedbergh. Meltwater channels are found in the Aysgarth area and between Cracoe and Arncliffe. A locality at Norber Brow to the north of Austwick where a collection of glacial erratic boulders of sandstone and limestone sits on limestone pedestals, and known as the Norber erratics, has long been a classic British site for physical geography students.

=== Karst ===
The limestone of the Yorkshire Dales gives rise to the most significant area of karst landscape in the United Kingdom. The solubility of the limestone in weakly acidic water has resulted in the development of a wide range of surface karst features such as limestone pavements, dry valleys, sinkholes and resurgences along with very extensive cave networks including the Three Counties System which, with over 86km of known passage, is the longest in the UK.

=== Mass movement ===
A number of landslides have taken place within the national park. Other than those recorded as taking place within the historic period, the exact age of most is difficult to determine. There are clusters of landslides within Coverdale and the valley of the Walden Beck to its northwest, as well as upper Nidderdale just outside of the national park. Others affect slopes west and south of Great Whernside in that area.

Outside of these areas, one of the larger examples is that on the southern slopes of Kisdon between Muker and Thwaite, Swaledale. Others are found at Newbiggin Pasture to the northeast of Askrigg and on the eastern flanks of Fountains Fell and east of Helwith Bridge, on the northeast side of Stainforth Beck, east of Stainforth in the incised valley below Catrigg Force and beneath Sharp Haw east of Gargrave. Others affect Kirkby Fell and the Hell Gill/Hanlith Gill area, west and east of Malham respectively.

== Economic geology ==
Limestone quarries continue to operate at Swinden Quarry, Cracoe whilst sandstone is worked at Dry Rigg and Arcow quarries at Helwith Bridge, and at Skirwith Quarry, Ingleton. Horton Quarry produces both sandstone & limestone.

Minerals were formerly worked at Trollers Gill and there are abandoned mineworkings above Kettlewell.

== Geohazards ==
The Dales are one of those regions where naturally produced radon is considered a hazard. Concentrations of this radioactive gas and its 'daughter products' are found within caves.
