= Brackenbottom =

Village in North Yorkshire, England

Coordinates: 54.14467°N 02.28214°W

- Location within North Yorkshire
- OS grid reference: SD816721
- Civil parish: Horton in Ribblesdale
- Unitary authority: North Yorkshire
- Ceremonial county: North Yorkshire
- Region: Yorkshire and the Humber
- Country: England
- Sovereign state: United Kingdom
- Post town: SETTLE
- Postcode district: BD24
- Police: North Yorkshire
- Fire: North Yorkshire
- Ambulance: Yorkshire

Brackenbottom is a hamlet in Ribblesdale, near to Horton-in-Ribblesdale, North Yorkshire, England. The hamlet is the location of the headquarters of Bradford Potholing Club who own a bunkhouse in the village.

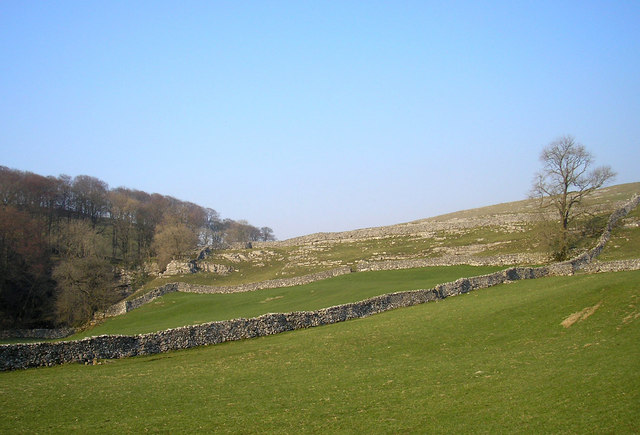
Douk Gill Scar above Brackenbottom
