= Ribblesdale =

Valley in North Yorkshire, England

Coordinates: 54°08′39.6″N 2°17′46.8″W

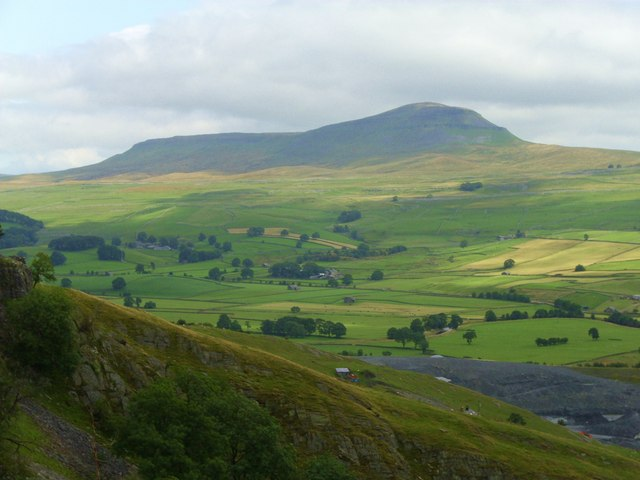
View across the valley from Moughton Nab

Ribblesdale is one of the Yorkshire Dales in England. It is the dale or upper valley of the River Ribble in North Yorkshire. Towns and villages in Ribblesdale (downstream, from north to south) include Selside, Horton-in-Ribblesdale, Stainforth, Langcliffe, Giggleswick, Settle, Long Preston and Hellifield. Below Hellifield (sometimes below Settle) the valley of the river is generally known as the Ribble Valley.

Ribblesdale is the setting of the medieval Harley lyric "Most I ryden by Rybbesdale" ('If I were to ride through Ribblesdale').

Above Settle the dale is within the Yorkshire Dales National Park. It is a popular tourist area, particularly for walking. The Yorkshire Three Peaks rise to the east and west of the dale. The Ribble Way runs the length of the dale. At the head of the dale is the Ribblehead Viaduct, crossed by the Settle to Carlisle railway which runs through the dale. Quarrying has been an important industry within the dale, and three quarries are still being worked; Arcow and Dry Rigg quarries produce gritstone (greywacke), and Horton Quarry produces limestone.

The dale was historically in the West Riding of Yorkshire. From 1974 to 2023 it was part of the Craven District, it is now administered by the unitary North Yorkshire Council.
