= Selside, North Yorkshire =

Village in North Yorkshire, England

Coordinates: 54°10′35″N 2°19′55″W

Selside
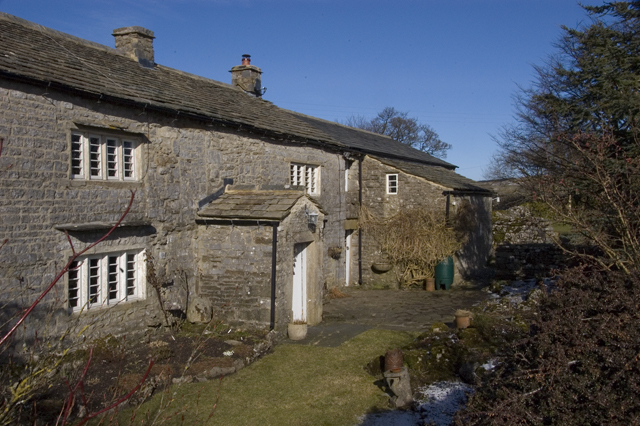
- Farmhouse in Selside

- Location within North Yorkshire
- OS grid reference: SD784756
- Civil parish: Horton in Ribblesdale
- Unitary authority: North Yorkshire
- Ceremonial county: North Yorkshire
- Region: Yorkshire and the Humber
- Country: England
- Sovereign state: United Kingdom
- Post town: SETTLE
- Postcode district: BD24
- Police: North Yorkshire
- Fire: North Yorkshire
- Ambulance: Yorkshire
- UK Parliament: Skipton and Ripon

Selside is a small village in Ribblesdale in North Yorkshire, England. It lies 2 miles (3 km) north west of Horton in Ribblesdale.

Selside was mentioned, in the form Selesat, in the Domesday Book, when it was held by Roger of Poitou. The place name is derived from the Old Norse selja "willow" and sǽtr "mountain pasture" or "shieling".

Until 1974 it was part of the West Riding of Yorkshire. From 1974 to 2023 it was part of the Craven District, it is now administered by the unitary North Yorkshire Council.

Selside lies on the Settle to Carlisle railway line. The Selside signal box, built in 1907, was moved in 1976 from the line to Steamtown Carnforth in Lancashire.

Other buildings in the village include Lodge Hall, built in 1687.

== See also ==
- Listed buildings in Horton in Ribblesdale
