= Listed buildings in Horton in Ribblesdale =

Horton in Ribblesdale is a civil parish in the county of North Yorkshire, England. It contains 32 listed buildings that are recorded in the National Heritage List for England. Of these, one is listed at Grade I, the highest of the three grades, one is at Grade II*, the middle grade, and the others are at Grade II, the lowest grade. The parish contains the village of Horton in Ribblesdale, smaller settlements including Selside, and the surrounding countryside. Most of the listed buildings are farmhouses, private houses and cottages, and the others include a church, bridges, and boundary stones.

== Key ==
Grade	Criteria
I	Buildings of exceptional interest, sometimes considered to be internationally important
II*	Particularly important buildings of more than special interest
II	Buildings of national importance and special interest

== Buildings ==
Name and location	Photograph	Date	Notes	Grade
St Oswald's Church; 54.14454°N 2.29216°W		12th century	The church has been altered and extended through the centuries, and was restored in 1879. It is built in stone with a lead roof, and consists of a nave, north and south aisles, a south porch, a chancel with north and south chapels, and a west tower. The tower has three stages, diagonal buttresses, and a west entrance with a moulded surround, a pointed arch and a hood mould, above which is a three-light Perpendicular window, a small trefoil window, two-light bell openings, a string course, and an embattled parapet. The porch is gabled and has a segmental-arched entrance, and the doorway is Norman, with zigzag decoration.	I
Ghyll Head Cottages; 54.14595°N 2.29035°W	—	Mid to late 17th century	A farmhouse, later two cottages, in stone, the left cottage limewashed, the right cottage pebbledashed, with painted stone dressings, and slate roofs. On the front is a porch, the entrance is plain, there is one basket arched window with a chamfered surround, and the other windows are mullioned with some mullions missing.	II
Bracken Bottom Farmhouse; 54.14467°N 2.28164°W		Late 17th century	The farmhouse is in stone, and has a stone slate roof with a coped gable and shaped kneeler on the left. There are two storeys and four bays. The central doorway has plain jambs, projecting imposts and a basket arched lintel. Most of the windows are mullioned, some with slate hood moulds.	II
Blindbeck Farmhouse and Cottage; 54.15248°N 2.30354°W		Late 17th century	The farmhouse and cottage, later used for other purposes, are in stone with a stone slate roof. There are two storeys and four bays, and a later rear wing. On the front is a gabled porch, the entrance with a chamfered surround and a Tudor arched head, and in the gable is a small chamfered window. The other windows are mullioned, some with hood moulds.	II
Bradford Potholers Club; 54.14495°N 2.28224°W	—	Late 17th century	A farmhouse later used for other purposes, it is in limestone with dressings in millstone grit and a slate roof. There are two storeys and three bays. The doorway has a plain surround, most of the windows are mullioned, with some mullions missing, and at the rear is a stair window with a transom.	II
Bridge End and Hannam Cottage; 54.14933°N 2.29591°W	—	Late 17th century	A house divided into two cottages, it is in limewashed stone, and has a stone slate roof. On the front are two doorways with gabled slate hoods, and the windows are sashes.	II
Pen Y Ghent Cottage; 54.14957°N 2.30038°W	—	Late 17th century	A farmhouse converted into a cottage, it is in stone on a plinth, and has a stone slate roof. There are two storeys and four bays. The doorway has a slate lintel, most of the windows are mullioned, with some mullions missing, and there is a single-light window.	II
Shaws Farmhouse; 54.17601°N 2.33149°W		Late 17th century	The farmhouse and cottage, which were extended in the 19th century, are in limestone with millstone grit dressings and a stone slate roof. There are two storeys, three bays, and a projecting single-storey bay on the left. On the front is an Ionic porch dated 1728, with fluted pilasters, an entablature, a pulvinated frieze, a pediment, and a doorway with a moulded surround. The windows are mullioned in moulded architraves, some with hood moulds.	II
Top Farmhouse; 54.17739°N 2.33347°W		Late 17th century	The farmhouse is in stone with a stone slate roof. There are two storeys and three bays. On the front is a gabled porch with a chamfered surround and a dated and initialled lintel. Most of the windows are mullioned, with some mullions missing, and some with hood moulds, and in the ground floor is a large 20th-century window.	II
Townhead Farmhouse; 54.14561°N 2.29075°W	—	Late 17th century	The farmhouse is in limewashed stone with stone dressings and a stone slate roof. There are two storeys and three bays, the right bay a projecting cross-wing containing a doorway with a moulded surround and a slate hood. The windows vary, and most are mullioned.	II
Lodge Hall; 54.19694°N 2.33870°W		1687	A farmhouse in limewashed stone, it has painted stone dressings and a stone slate roof. There are three storeys and a T-shaped plan, with a front range of four bays, the right two bays projecting slightly with the corner curved. The doorway has a moulded surround flanked by halberds, and a decorated lintel. Above it is an initialled datestone, a corbelled round hood and a slate hood above. In the lower two floors are cross windows with hood moulds. In the top floor is a three-light stepped mullioned window with a stepped hood mould, and in the left bay upper two floors are vesica-shaped windows. On the curved corner are two-light mullioned and transomed windows turning the corner. The right bay contains a mullioned and transomed window in the lower two floors and a fixed light in the top floor.	II*
Foxwood Cottage; 54.15849°N 2.29951°W	—	c. 1700	A farmhouse, later used for other purposes, it is limewashed stone, with painted stone dressings, shaped eaves modillions, and a stone slate roof. There are two storeys, two bays, and a continuous rear outshut. The doorway has a moulded surround, and a moulded hood mould. The windows are mullioned, with some mullions missing, and on the right return is a painted sundial with a moulded hood mould.	II
Beecroft Hall; 54.14890°N 2.30848°W		Late 17th to early 18th century	The former farmhouse is in limewashed stone with a stone slate roof. There are two storeys and two bays, and a later gabled bay on the left. The doorway has a plain surround. Most of the windows are mullioned or mullioned and transomed, and some are boarded. In the right return is a round window, and there are through stones at the rear and on the right.	II
Rowe Farmhouse; 54.15173°N 2.30199°W	—	1723	The farmhouse is in limestone with millstone grit dressings and a stone slate roof. There are two storeys, two bays, and a rear outshut. The central doorway has a moulded surround and a decorated, initialled and dated lintel and a hood mould, and the windows are mullioned.	II
Fawber Farmhouse; 54.16619°N 2.29593°W	—	Early 18th century	The farmhouse is rendered, with stone dressings and a stone slate roof. There are two storeys and three bays. In the centre is a gabled porch, the windows are mullioned, and at the rear is a mullioned and transomed stair window.	II
Foredale Farmhouse; 54.12534°N 2.30122°W		1731	The farmhouse is pebbledashed, and has painted stone dressings and a slate roof. There are two storeys, three bays on the garden front, and four at the rear facing the road. On the garden front is a gabled porch, its entrance with a moulded surround, and a decorated, dated and initialled lintel, and a cornice. Most of the windows are mullioned, with some mullions missing, and one has been converted into a French window.	II
Higher Studfold Farmhouse; 54.13026°N 2.28774°W		18th century	The farmhouse is in limewashed stone with millstone grit dressings and a stone slate roof. There are two storeys and four bays. On the front is a gabled porch and a doorway with a plain surround, and most of the windows are mullioned, with some mullions missing.	II
Keeper's Cottage; 54.14552°N 2.28166°W	—	Mid 18th century	The farmhouse is in stone, with millstone grit dressing, and a slate roof with gable coping. There are two storeys and three bays. The central doorway has a plain surround, and the windows are mullioned with moulded surrounds.	II
Ling Ghyll Bridge; 54.20579°N 2.30351°W		1765	This is the date of the bridge's rebuilding. It carries a track over Cam Beck, and is in stone. The bridge consists of a single segmental arch with a raked string course and a coped parapet. There is a small wing wall on the northwest, and on the north wall is an inscribed and dated panel.	II
Gray Bridge; 54.14950°N 2.29579°W		Mid to late 18th century	The bridge carries the B6479 road over Brants Ghyll. It is in stone and consists of a single segmental arch. The bridge has a raked string course and a raked parapet.	II
Holme Farmhouse; 54.14524°N 2.29321°W	—	Mid to late 18th century	The farmhouse is in limestone with dressings in millstone grit and a stone slate roof. There are two storeys and two bays. In the centre is a gabled porch, and the window have three lights and mullions, those in the ground floor with hood moulds.	II
Crooks Farmhouse; 54.14514°N 2.29127°W	—	Late 18th century	The farmhouse is in limestone, with dressings in millstone grit, square eaves modillions and a slate roof. There are two storeys and two bays. The central doorway has a plain surround. The windows on the front have three lights and chamfered mullions, and in the left return is a two-light 17th-century mullioned window, the mullion missing.	II
New Inn Bridge; 54.14976°N 2.29634°W		Late 18th century	The bridge carries Station Road (B6479 road) over the River Ribble. It is in stone, and consists of two segmental arches. On the south is an angular cutwater, and central and flanking pilasters with moulded caps. The bridge has a string course and a coped parapet and wing walls. The north cutwater has a segmental pointed curve and a canted bay above for pedestrians, and in the north parapet is a stile with steps.	II
North Cote Farmhouse; 54.17569°N 2.33366°W	—	Late 18th century	The farmhouse is in stone with millstone grit dressings and a slate roof. There are two storeys and three bays. The central doorway has a plain surround, and most of the windows are mullioned, with some mullions missing, those in the ground floor with hood moulds.	II
Green Gates Farmhouse; 54.14506°N 2.28184°W		1781	The farmhouse is in limestone, with dressings in millstone grit, shaped eaves modillions, and a stone slate roof with shaped kneelers and coping. There are two storeys and three bays. In the centre is a doorway with a plain surround on a square base, and an inscribed and dated lintel. The rear entrance has a moulded surround and an initialled and dated lintel. Most of the windows are sashes, and there is one chamfered mullioned window.	II
Douk Ghyll Farmhouse; 54.14679°N 2.28808°W	—	c. 1800	The farmhouse is in limestone, with dressings in millstone grit, shaped modillions, and a stone slate roof with kneelers. There are two storeys and three bays. In the centre is a gabled porch, and the windows have flat-faced mullions.	II
South View Cottage; 54.14958°N 2.29544°W		1801	The cottage is in limestone, with dressings in millstone grit, and a slate roof with a shaped kneeler and gable coping on the right. There are two storeys and two bays. The entrance has a moulded surround, a gabled hood, and an initialled datestone. The windows are mullioned with two lights.	II
Studfold House; 54.12649°N 2.28674°W	—	c. 1810	The house, which was extended later in the 19th century, is in limestone with sandstone dressings and a stone slate roof. There are two storeys, two bays, and the additional bay on the right. On the front is a porch with a round-headed entrance, and a round-headed doorway with imposts and a keystone. Most of the windows in the original part are mullioned with two lights, and in the extension are sashes.	II
Boundary stone at SD7804477935; 54.19998°N 2.34404°W	—	Early 19th century	The parish boundary stone consists of a painted stone slab with an angled top and a vertical groove down the middle. On the left side is inscribed "HORTON" and on the right side is "INGLETON".	II
Boundary stone at SD8240169252 (left); 54.11885°N 2.27074°W		Early 19th century	The parish boundary stone consists of a slate slab about 1 metre (3 ft 3 in) high. The upper surface is angled from top right to bottom left and is inscribed "STAINFORTH".	II
Boundary stone at SD8240169252 (right); 54.11885°N 2.27074°W		Early 19th century	The parish boundary stone consists of a slate slab about 1 metre (3 ft 3 in) high. The upper surface is angled from top left to bottom right and is inscribed "HORTON".	II
Helwith Bridge; 54.12143°N 2.29004°W		1875	The bridge was built to carry Austwick Road over the River Ribble and the Settle–Carlisle line of the Midland Railway. It is in gritstone with brick arch heads, and consists of six segmental arches. The bridge has a band and parapets.	II
