= High Birkwith =

Hamlet in North Yorkshire, England

Coordinates: 54.1865°N 2.3081°W

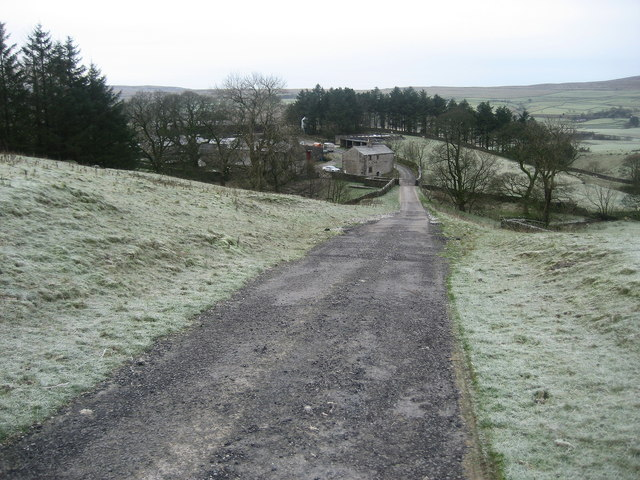
- Country lane in High Birkwith

- Location within North Yorkshire
- OS grid reference: SD799767
- Civil parish: Horton in Ribblesdale
- Unitary authority: North Yorkshire
- Ceremonial county: North Yorkshire
- Region: Yorkshire and the Humber
- Country: England
- Sovereign state: United Kingdom
- Post town: SETTLE
- Postcode district: BD24
- Police: North Yorkshire
- Fire: North Yorkshire
- Ambulance: Yorkshire
- UK Parliament: Skipton and Ripon

High Birkwith is a hamlet in the county of North Yorkshire, England. It lies north of the village of Horton in Ribblesdale in the civil parish of the same name.

Until 1974 it was part of the West Riding of Yorkshire, then from 1974 to 2023 it was part of the Craven District. It is now administered by the unitary North Yorkshire Council.
