= Ingleton Group =

Group of stones in England

- Stratigraphic range: Arenig
- Type: Group
- Thickness: at least 600 m (2,000 ft)

Lithology
- Primary: turbiditic sandstone, siltstone, conglomerate

Location
- Region: England
- Country: United Kingdom
- Extent: Craven inliers, North Yorkshire

The Ingleton Group is a group of Ordovician turbiditic sandstones, siltstones, conglomerates found within inliers in the Craven district of North Yorkshire, England. The two inliers are exposed in the valley of the River Doe northeast of Ingleton and at Horton-in-Ribblesdale to the east. Of deep marine origin, these grey-green rocks are unconformably overlain by late Ordovician and Silurian strata. The sandstones are commercially exploited at Ingleton Quarry.
