= Lodge Hall =

Historic building, England

Coordinates: 54°11′49″N 2°20′19″W

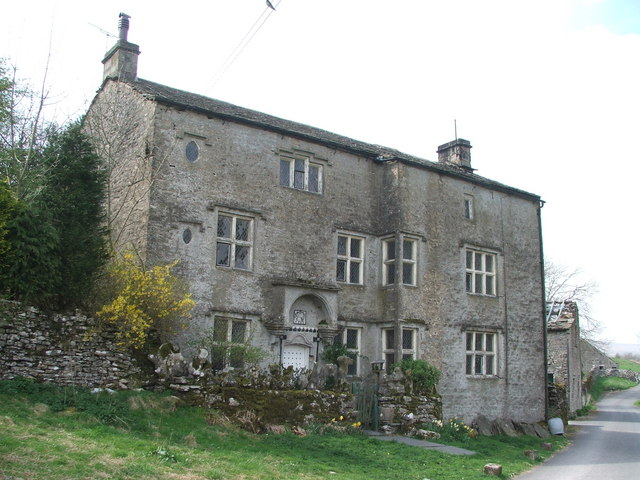
The building, in 2006

Lodge Hall, also known as Ingman Lodge, is a historic building in Selside, North Yorkshire, a village in England.

The large farmhouse was built in 1687. At some point, its left chimneystack collapsed, and was rebuilt in a new position. The rebuilding destroyed evidence of an extension to the south, which may originally have been part of an earlier building on the site. It was grade II* listed in 1958, but it appears on the Heritage at Risk Register due to structural cracks and roof leaks.

The house is built of limewashed stone, with painted stone dressings and a stone slate roof. It has three storeys and a T-shaped plan, with a front range of four bays, the right two bays projecting slightly with the corner curved. The doorway has a moulded surround flanked by halberds, and a decorated lintel. Above it is an initialled datestone, a corbelled round hood and a slate hood above. In the lower two floors are cross windows with hood moulds. In the top floor is a three-light stepped mullioned window with a stepped hood mould, and in the left bay upper two floors are vesica-shaped windows. On the curved corner are two-light mullioned and transomed windows turning the corner. The right bay contains a mullioned and transomed window in the lower two floors and a fixed light in the top floor. Some of the window bars retain the fixing wire from which the original, removable, panes of glass were hung. Inside, early kitchen and parlour fireplaces survive.

== See also ==
- Grade II* listed buildings in North Yorkshire (district)
- Listed buildings in Horton in Ribblesdale
