= Arcow quarry =

Quarry in North Yorkshire, England

Coordinates: 54.129°N 2.301°W

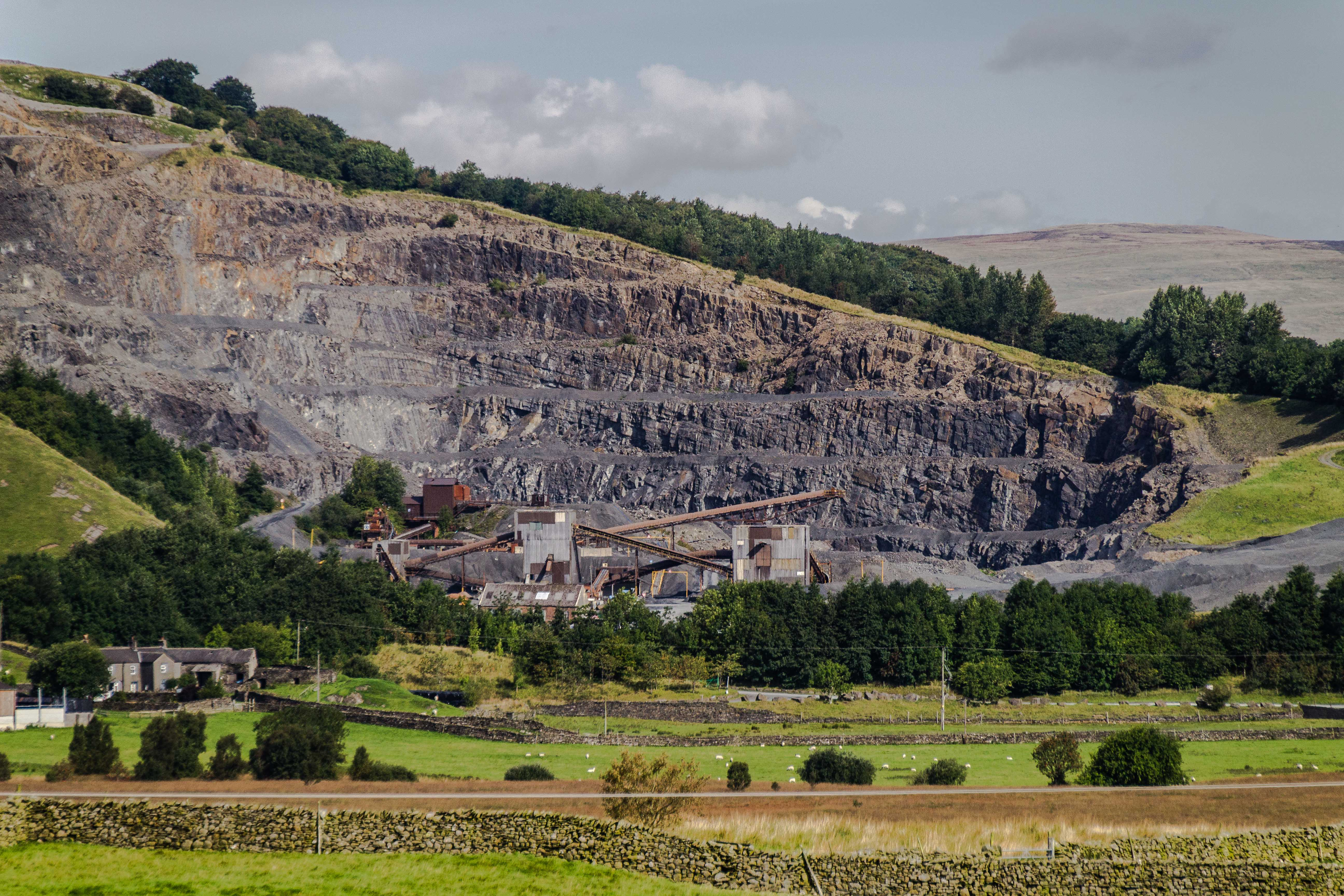
The quarry in 2016

Arcow Quarry is a gritstone quarry owned by Tarmac at Helwith Bridge, Horton-in-Ribblesdale, North Yorkshire, England. It provides gritstone to the road construction and maintenance industries. Mining at the site began in the early 18th century.

In July 2026, it was announced that the quarry intends to be in operation until 2045.
