= Friends of the Three Peaks =

The Friends of the Three Peaks are a group of individuals and organisations who want to protect and enhance the special qualities of the distinctive and inspirational landscapes of the Three Peaks area in the Yorkshire Dales National Park.

It is run by the Yorkshire Dales National Park Ranger Service for people walking the three peaks area.
