= Yorkshire Three Peaks =

Mountainous peaks in the Yorkshire Dales National Park

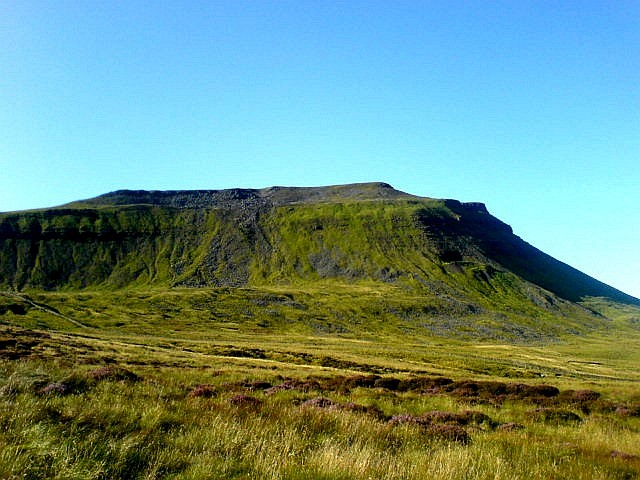
The western flanks of Ingleborough as seen from the peat bog below

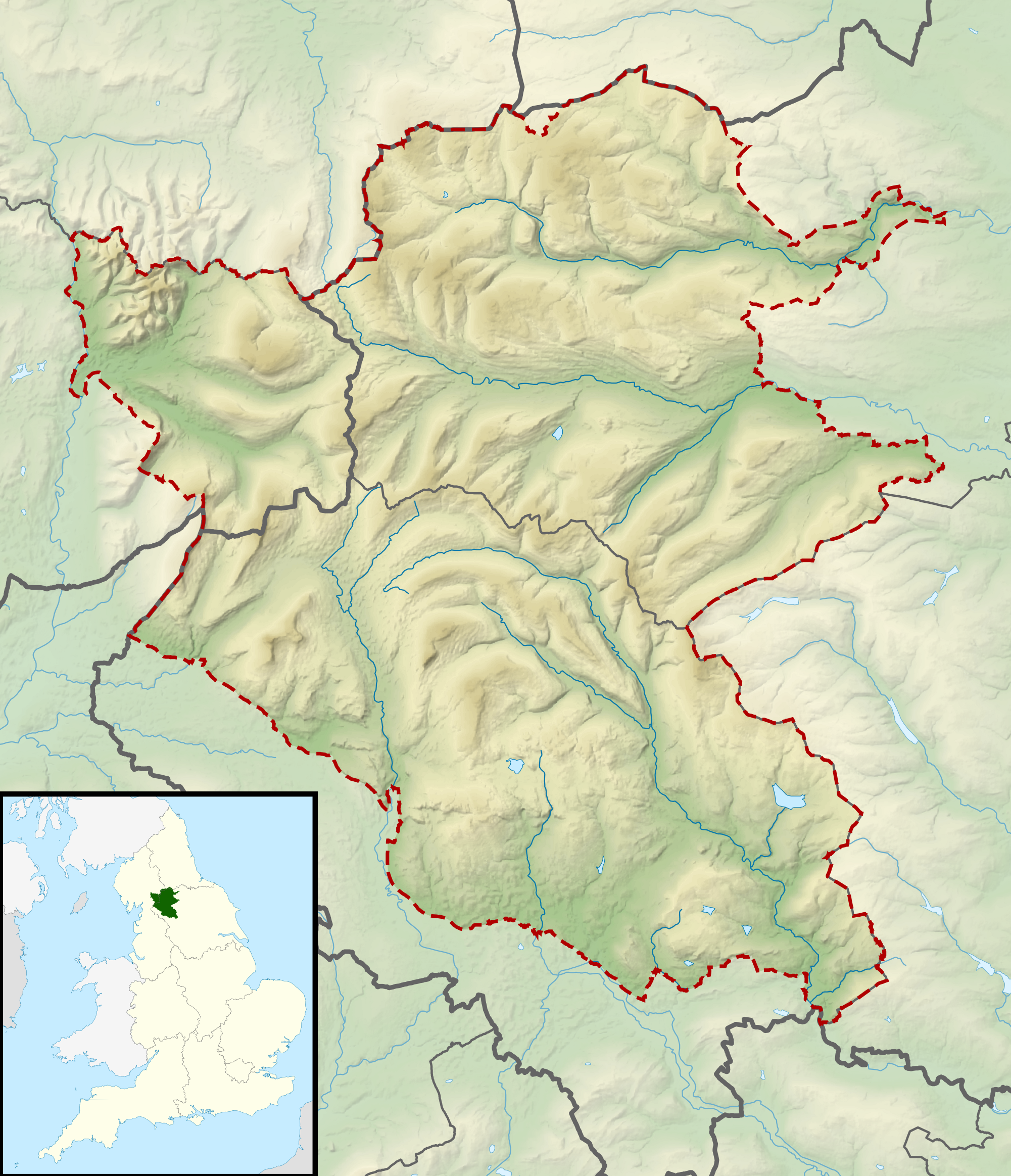
Shown within the Yorkshire Dales National Park

The mountains of Whernside (736 m or 2,415 ft), Ingleborough (723 m or 2,372 ft) and Pen-y-ghent (694 m or 2,277 ft) are collectively known as the Three Peaks. The peaks, which form part of the Pennine range, encircle the head of the valley of the River Ribble in the Yorkshire Dales National Park in the North of England.

== Name ==
The long-standing designation "The Three Peaks" is well known locally, and in past times nationally. However, there are now a number of "National" Three Peaks adventure challenges involving Ben Nevis, Snowdon and Scafell Pike (respectively the highest summits in Scotland, Wales and England). The epithet "Yorkshire" is therefore now commonly added to differentiate Yorkshire's Three Peaks from those (although Whernside is partially in Cumbria, with the summit trig point being narrowly on the Cumbria side, the whole mountain is within the historic county of Yorkshire).

== Geology ==
In common with neighbouring fells, the Three Peaks are carved from an almost flat-lying succession of sedimentary strata of Carboniferous age. The lower slopes of each of the fells are formed from massive limestones assigned to the Visean age Great Scar Group. The upper slopes of each of the fells are formed from alternating bands of limestone and mudstone grading up into sandstone, all of which are assigned to the Brigantian and early Namurian ages Yoredale Group. These alternations are considered to be a classic British example of cyclothems. Differential weathering and erosion of the various bands has given Ingleborough and Pen-y-ghent a distinctive, stepped appearance. The summits are capped by Grassington Grit, a variety of Millstone Grit.

Considerable areas of the flanks of each of the fells are covered by peat whilst other areas are blanketed by glacial till notably across the southern and eastern slopes of Pen-y-ghent. The Ribblehead drumlin field is considered to be one of the finest in England. Fringing Ingleborough on each side however are impressive areas of limestone pavement.

Extensive networks of caves have developed within the limestone strata such as the White Scar Caves, and potholes which attract cavers from all over the country. It is home to England's highest waterfall at Gaping Gill, where the Fell Beck drops 98 m (322 ft) vertically down a pothole, into Britain's second largest cavern. The beck re-emerges further down the mountain adjacent to Ingleborough Cave, where visitors can take a guided tour of a floodlit part of the cave system. Whernside, being more rounded, is visually less imposing than its neighbours, but its summit is the highest point in North Yorkshire. (Note: Mickle Fell in southern Teesdale is the highest point within the boundaries of the historic county of Yorkshire.)

== History ==
The area is rich in historical interest. The summit of Ingleborough has the remains of a huge Iron Age hill fort, while the Settle-Carlisle Railway runs between the mountains, crossing Ribblehead Viaduct at the foot of Whernside.

== Leisure ==
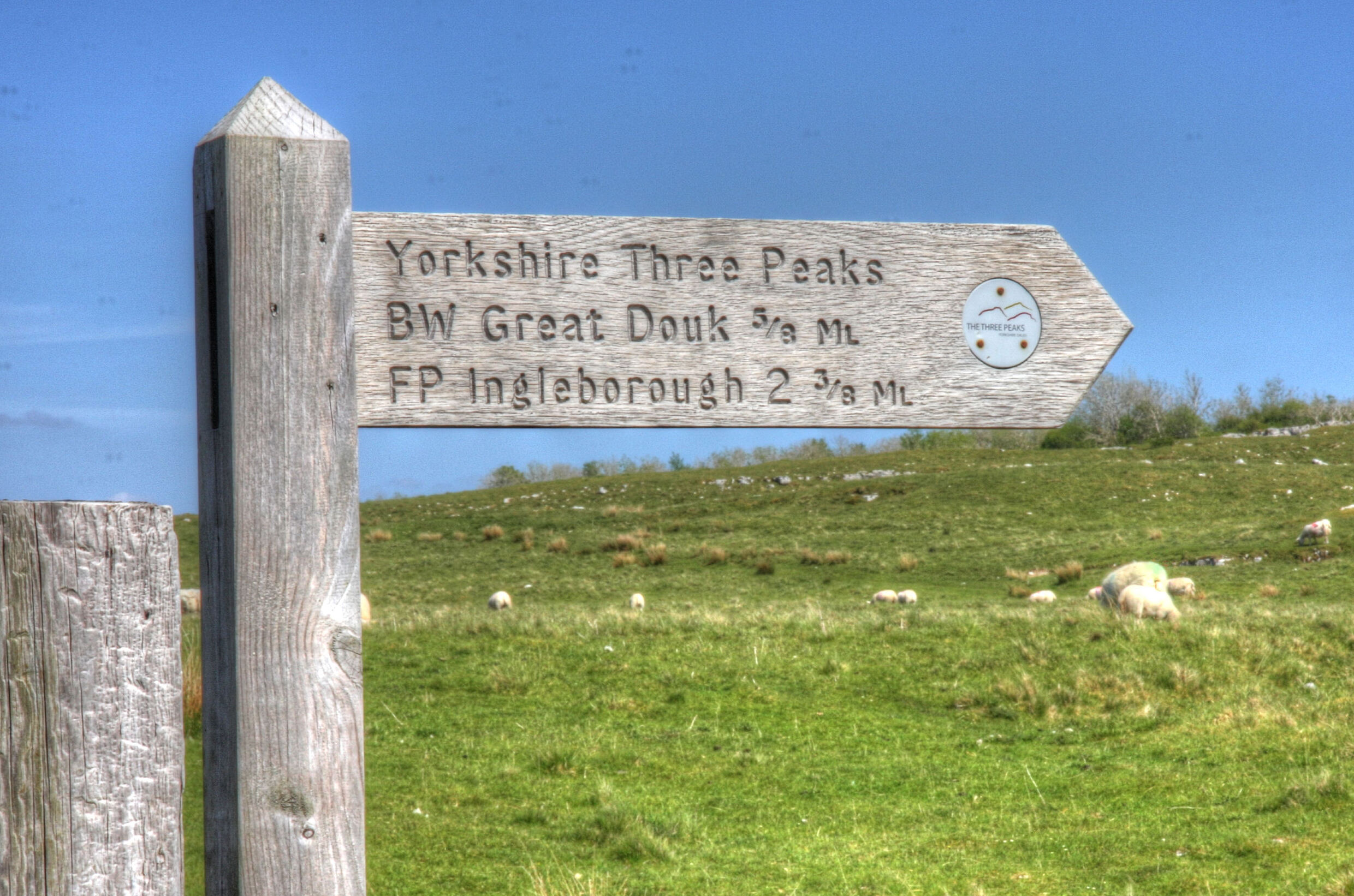
Three Peaks sign post

=== Long-distance footpaths ===
- The Pennine Way visits Horton and crosses the summit of Pen-y-ghent.
- The Ribble Way follows the River Ribble from its source near the foot of Whernside to its mouth near Preston.

=== The Three Peaks walk ===
The Three Peaks walk of Pen-y-ghent, Whernside and Ingleborough is probably the original three peak walk within the UK. The first recorded ascent of the three hills was in July 1887 by J. R. Wynne-Edwards and D. R. Smith in a time of 10 hours. The walk covers a distance of 37.5 km (23.3 mi) to 42 km (26.1 mi) (depending on route) circuit of all three peaks with nearly 1,600 m (5,249 ft) of ascent and descent. A challenge that many walkers aim for when undertaking the walk is to complete the walk in under 12 hours, though as Alfred Wainwright says in his book Wainwright in the Limestone Dales, "Some participants have chosen to regard the walk as a race, and this is to be greatly regretted, walking is a pleasure to be enjoyed in comfort" (edited quote). The route most walkers take varies from the fell race in that most traverse the 'nose' of Pen-y-ghent from Brackenbottom Moor and do not ascend from the Pennine Way. Additionally, Whernside is generally traversed along the right-of-way to the east, initially following the railway line, all of which can add extra distance to the route.

For most people the route starts in the village of Horton-in-Ribblesdale, though many start from various points in the circular route, such as Chapel-le-Dale or Ribblehead Viaduct. Historically Chapel-le-Dale was the starting point though this probably changed when the Pen-y-ghent Cafe started running their clocking in and out service for walkers in 1968. The cafe is currently closed (@ March 2020) and as a result walkers can no longer register the beginning and end of their walk or pay to join the Pen-y-ghent Cafe's privately owned 'Three Peaks of Yorkshire Club'.

The Yorkshire Dales National Park runs a voluntary Friends of the Three Peaks project. The proceeds of this go towards the upkeep of the paths on the route. Certificates, medals and membership forms are awarded by local participating businesses.

==== The walking challenge ====
The Three Peaks Walk has become very popular for charity sponsored walks, and Saturdays in early summer can see several hundred walkers make their way round the route.

=== The races ===
In addition to it being seen as a walking challenge it has also become a race for fell runners and cyclo-cross cyclists. However, there is no bridleway access to the peaks (except Ingleborough from the Ingleton side only) so any bicycle access is on a permissive basis on race days only.

- The Three Peaks Race, has been held annually since 1954 and traditionally started at the Hill Inn until 1975, when the start moved to Horton. In 2008 this race was also the World Long Distance Mountain Running Challenge. The current record time for the men's race is 2:29:53, set by Jeff Norman on 28 April 1974. The current record time for the women's race is 3:09:19, set by Victoria Wilkinson on 29 April 2017.
- The Three Peaks Cyclo-Cross race follows a longer, 61 km (38 mi), route across the peaks.
- Yorkshire 3 Peaks Ultra is a 70-kilometre (43 mi) self-navigation ultra marathon held annually in October. Starting in Hawes, it joins the classic Yorkshire Three Peaks route around Whernside, Ingleborough and Pen-y-ghent, returning to Hawes via the Pennine Way.

== Media ==
The Three Peaks were featured on the BBC Two programme Seven Natural Wonders as one of the wonders of Yorkshire.

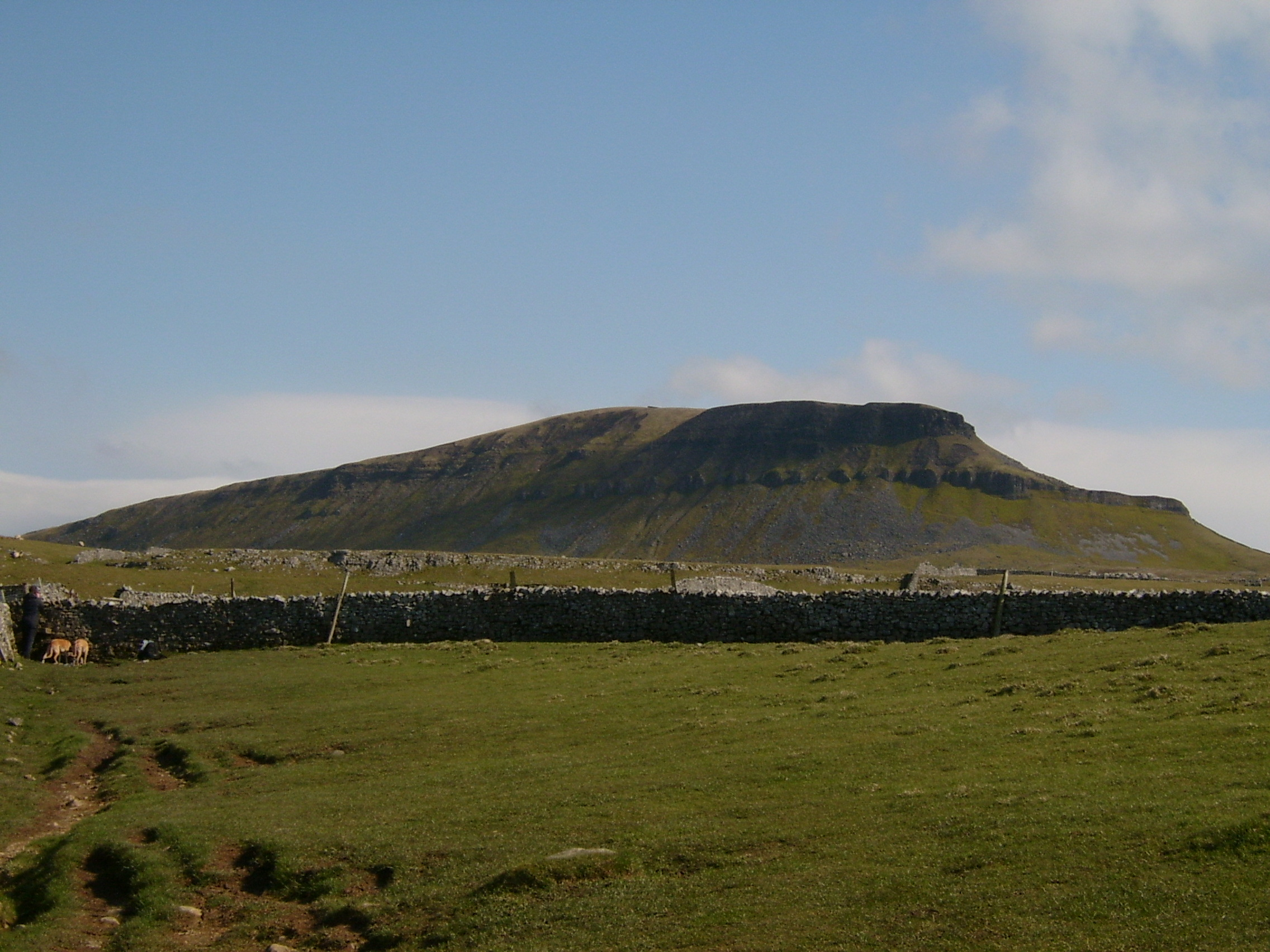
Pen-y-ghent

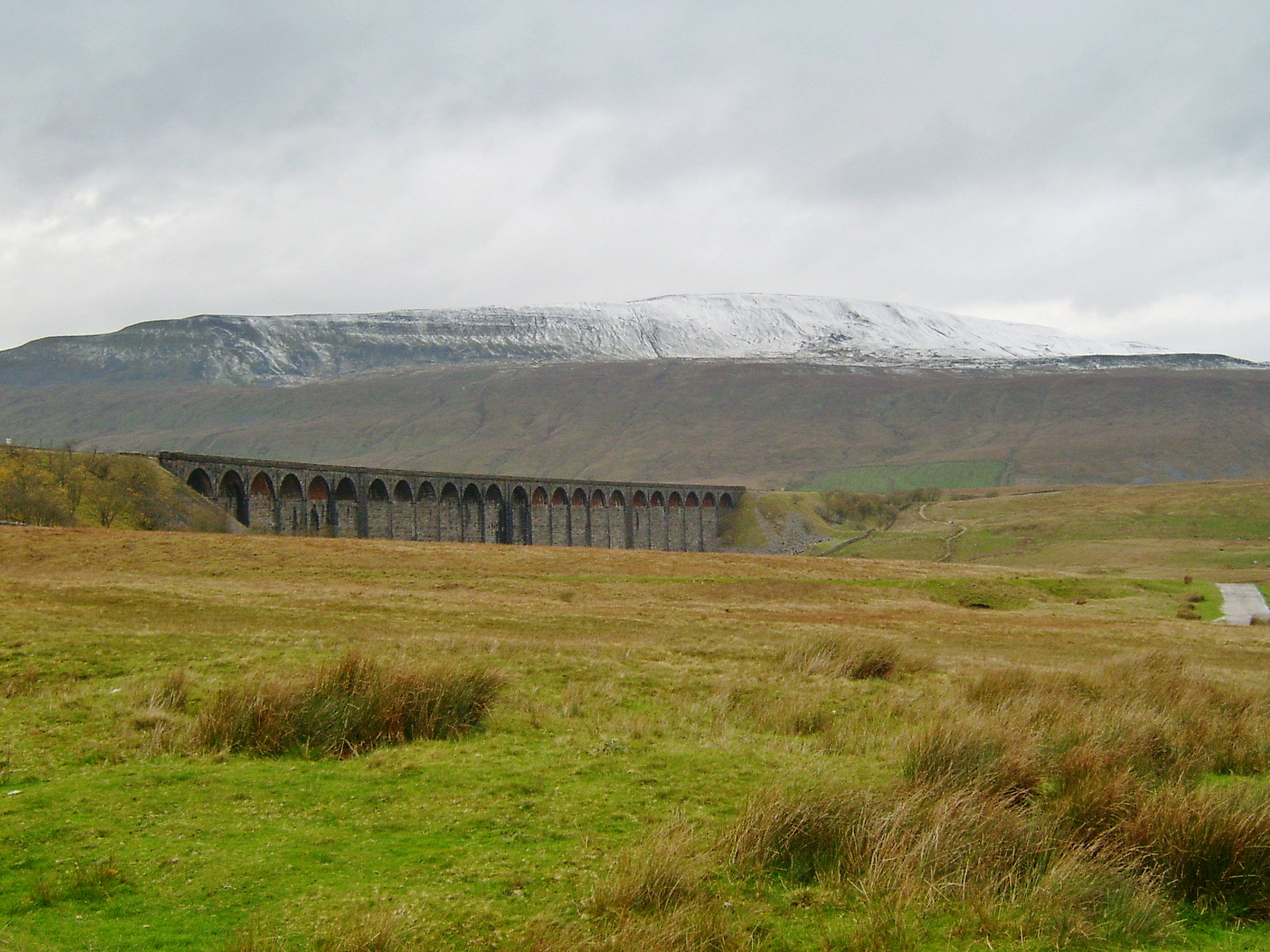
Whernside

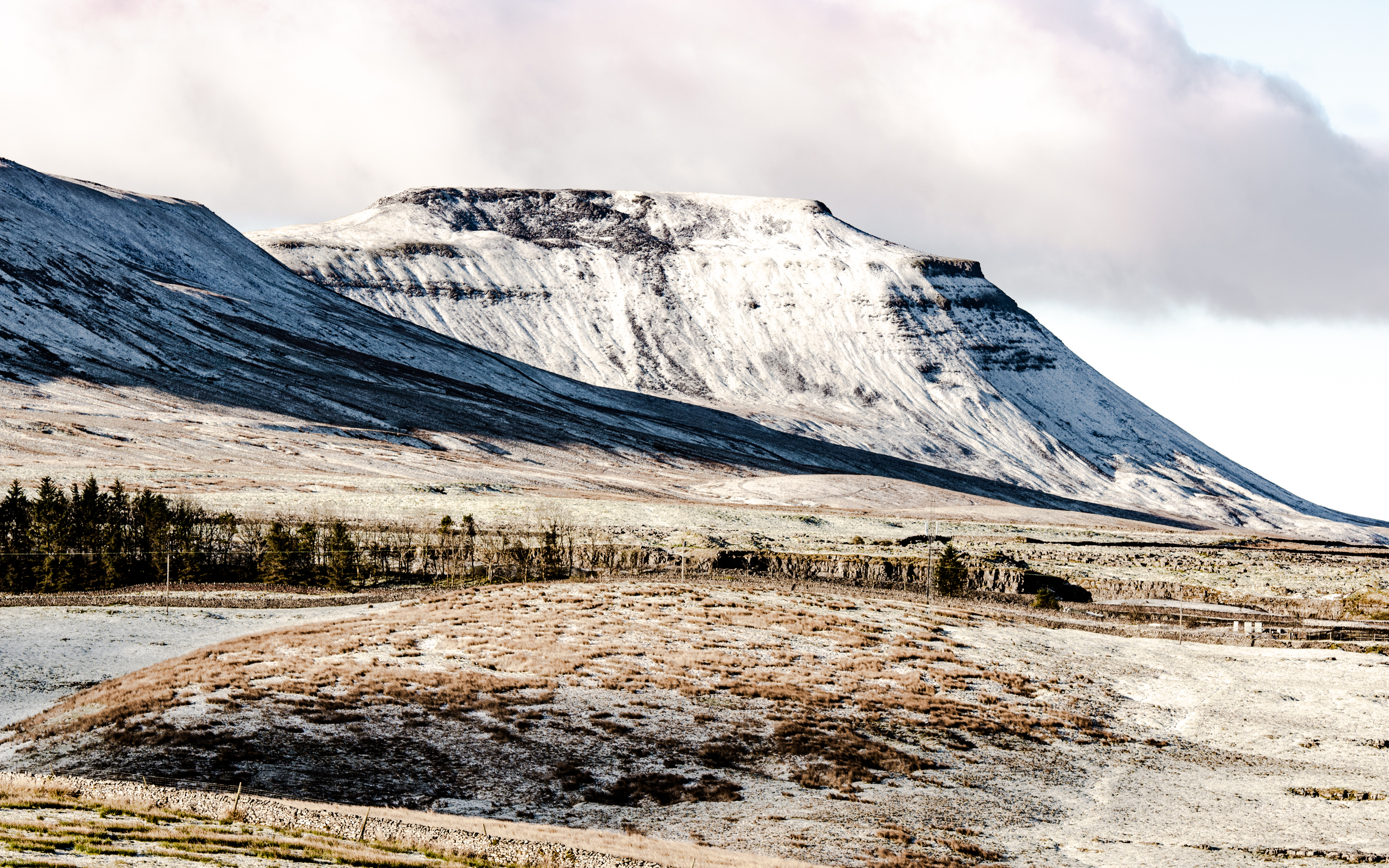
Ingleborough

== Location of Peaks ==
Point	Coordinates (Links to map resources)	OS Grid Ref	Notes
Whernside	54.227730°N 2.402498°W	SD73868141	
Ingleborough	54.166564°N 2.397793°W	SD74137460	
Pen-y-ghent	54.156006°N 2.248735°W	SD83857338	
