= Horton Quarry =

Limestone quarry in North Yorkshire, England

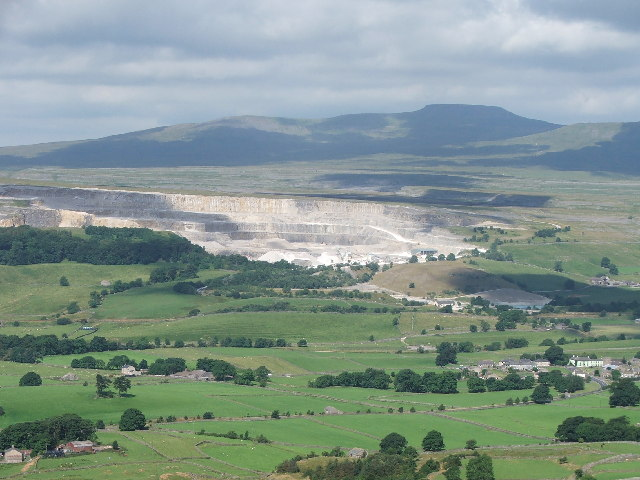
- Horton Quarry, seen from the east

- Location within North Yorkshire
- Location: Horton in Ribblesdale, North Yorkshire, England; 54.143°N 2.311°W
- Products: Limestone
- Opened: 1889
- Company: Heidelberg Materials UK
- Website: Official website
- Acquired: 2000

Horton Quarry is a limestone quarry near to Horton-in-Ribblesdale, North Yorkshire, England. The quarry, which is some 6 miles (9.7 km) north of Settle, has been operating since at least 1889, and produces limestone for a variety of purposes. Stone used to be exported from the quarry by rail, but after closure of the sidings in the mid-sixties, it has been exported by lorry. The sidings were re-instated in April 2025 with operations starting shortly afterwards. The quarry used to produce its own lime by roasting the limestone in big kilns on the site, but the last of these were removed in the 1980s. Since 2000, the quarry has been owned and operated by Heidelberg Materials UK.

== History ==
Horton lime quarry was also known as Beecroft Quarry, which was the name of the farm that it replaced. The development of the nearby Settle–Carlisle line in 1876, allowed the Great Scar limestone in the area to be worked on an industrial basis. A quarry had existed at Beecroft since 1850 working the greywacke sandstone, but this was expanded greatly by a local businessman, John Delaney, who purchased much of the land surrounding the earlier quarry to work the limestone. Horton Quarry was opened in 1889; Delaney also had several other limestone and quarrying concerns in the Craven District of North Yorkshire. The quarry is to the west of the village of Horton in Ribblesdale, on the west bank of the River Ribble, just over 6 miles (9.7 km) north of Settle. It works the Carboniferous Limestone formation, but its location near to Arcow and Dry Rigg quarries, means there is also some greywacke present in the quarry area. Previously, the exposed sandstones and siltstones were worked at the quarry bottom, but that area was later flooded. Initially worked by hand with little machinery, tubs of limestone were allowed to descend a very steep incline to a rudimentary processing plant, which was powered by a steam traction engine. The advantage of this was the traction could be moved around the quarry floor as needed. The method of extracting rock was by blasting and hand-recovery; mechanization of the workings did not occur until June 1945, precipitated by a shortage of workers.

Around the turn of the 20th century, Horton was exporting almost 50,000 tonnes (55,000 tons) of limestone via the Settle and Carlisle railway, which represented a third of all mineral traffic on the line. Although originally licensed to do so, the quarry at Horton is partially responsible for the destruction of the limestone pavement in the area. It has been noted that due to the long and complicated process for the creation of the limestone pavement, the quarrying of it is not sustainable, and once damaged, will never recover. When the quarry was acquired by Hanson in 2000, they announced that they would relinquish the rights to quarry the limestone pavement.

The quarry face runs on a north-south alignment (parallel to the railway) and in the 1940s, it was 150-foot (46 m) deep. The quarry face is prominent in the landscape, being visible from the valley floor and on the eastern side of Ribblesdale. The quarry used to have kilns to produce lime from the limestone it quarried. In 1954, the three Spencer kilns were replaced by a bank of four Priest-Knibbs kilns. These were in turn demolished in the early 1980s when lime production ceased at the quarry. In 1961, ICI Mond made an offer to the then owning company (Settle Limes) of £1.34 million (equivalent to £26,000,000 in 2025), which saw the quarry become part of the ICI brand in August of that year. ICI were keen to expand their lime portfolio and in the United Kingdom, lime was in short supply at that time. The quarry continued to operate as Settle Limes until 1970, when it was rebranded as ICI.

Since the year 2000, the quarry has been worked by Hanson, who have permission to extract 40,000,000 tonnes (44,000,000 tons) which will extend the life of the quarry until 2042, and see it extend to nearly 80 hectares (200 acres) in size. Hanson bought the quarry after previous owners Tarmac and Tilcon amalgamated, with competition rules demanding that they give up some of the assets. The company are permitted to quarry 600,000 tonnes (660,000 tons) per year, though in the early 2010s, the amount quarried was 450,000 tonnes (500,000 tons) per year.

== Transport ==
The quarry lost its rail connection in February 1965, and the idea of reconnecting the quarry to the Settle-Carlisle railway line was mooted over the years, to avoid lorries driving through the village of Horton-in-Ribblesdale which has several listed buildings and bridges. Conditional approval was granted in 1996, and plans were submitted to build a north-facing connection into the quarry from the line, which would necessitate the closure of the foot-crossing in the station. In April 2025 two loading sidings were built and connected to the Settle and Carlisle line.

In 2021, 600 tonnes (660 tons) of stone from the quarry was used to re-line the path up to the summit of Ingleborough. The path had become worn with use, and the company donated the stone.

== Owners ==
- 1889 – c. 1926 Delaney's
- c. 1926 – 1961 Settle Limes
- 1961 – 1980 ICI (Between 1961 and 1970, still traded as Settle Limes)
- 1980 – 2000 Tarmac
- 2000 – present Hanson

== Local environment ==
The southern, western and northern sides of the quarry are all bordering the Ingleborough SSSI and Ingleborough SAC. These are noted for the juniper growing on the limestone pavement and other grasses which grow in that environment. A variety of wildlife has been observed in the quarry, including skylarks and various butterflies including the northern brown argus, high brown and pearl-bordered fritillary.
