= Dry Rigg Quarry =

Gritstone quarry in North Yorkshire, England

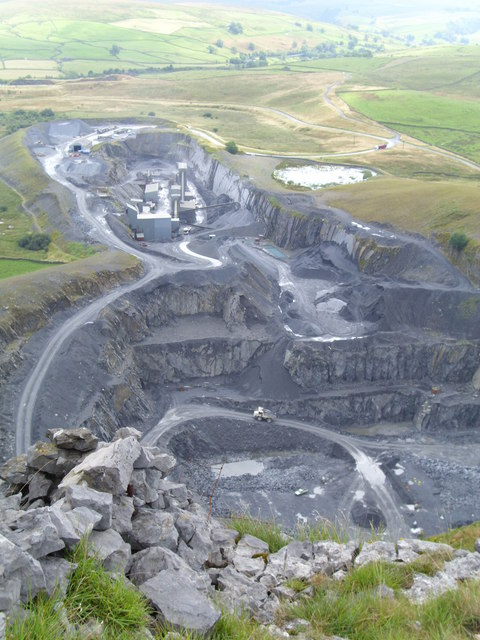
- Dry Rigg Quarry from the west

- Location within North Yorkshire
- Location: Helwith Bridge, Horton-in-Ribblesdale, North Yorkshire, England; 54.120°N 2.304°W
- Products: Gritstone (Greywacke)
- Production: 20,000 tonnes (22,000 tons)
- Opened: 1938
- Closed: 2035 (Projected)
- Company: Tarmac
- Website: Official website
- Acquired: 2015

Dry Rigg Quarry is a quarry at Helwith Bridge in North Yorkshire, England, located within the Yorkshire Dales National Park. The quarry produces a hard-wearing gritstone (also known as greywacke) which is listed as being nationally important for road building, and is one of four in the Yorkshire Dales National Park that produces this type of aggregate. The quarry operations have come under public scrutiny due to the amount of road traffic, leading to some of the output from Dry Rigg being moved from the adjacent railhead at Arcow Quarry. The quarry is situated in Upper Ribblesdale some 1.9 miles (3 km) south of Horton-in-Ribblesdale, and 5 miles (8 km) north of Settle.

== History ==
The current Dry Rigg workings were established in 1938 by a Mr Walker of Cullingworth, and the expansion of the quarry absorbed the former Combs Thorn Quarry, which was located to the west of Dry Rigg. Earlier workings are shown on mapping from 1909, when several quarries which are now defunct, also appear. Combs Quarry was started in the 18th century, but by 1880, quarrying had ceased, however, Dry Rigg was opened in 1938 to provide an "insatiable demand for aggregate". Initially, Dry Rigg supplied flagstone to the towns and cities across Northern England, though most was used locally around the area. The site is 1.9 miles (3 km) south of Horton-in-Ribblesdale, and 5 miles (8 km) north of Settle.

The gritstone (greywacke) produced at Dry Rigg is known as being nationally important for its skid-resistant properties in road building, with Dry Rigg being one of 15 sites in England and Wales that can produce stone to a high PSV. (Note: Polished Stone Value - PSV is the measure of how skid-resistant the stone is.) The stone worked at Dry Rigg is part of the Horton Formation, a gritstone laid down in the Silurian period, and typically rates at 65 in its PSV. Previous uses of stone from the Combs Thorn (Dry Rigg) quarry area was as a flagstone, with the area being noted for its "blue flag and slate stones". The abundance of this rock led to a proposal to construct a canal between Settle and Lancaster in 1774, though this did not come to fruition. Dry Rigg is one of four quarries in the Yorkshire Dales National Park that produces High Specification Aggregate (HSA), the others being Horton Quarry, Ingleton Quarry, and Arcow Quarry, the last of which is located close to Dry Rigg.

Since its opening in 1938, stone from Dry Rigg has been used in the road-building programme that was ongoing through Britain at that time. The owners abandoned the quarrying of flagstones in favour of crushed rock. Aggregate from Dry Rigg has been used for surfacing runways at Manchester Airport and the Falkland Islands, both carriageways of the M6 at Tebay in 1971, the Newbury Bypass in Berkshire, and at airstrips in the Orkney Isles. The quarry covers an area of 26 hectares (64 acres) and was 322 feet (98 m) deep in 2021. In 2016, the connection to the Settle-Carlisle Line was reopened to Arcow Quarry. This allows for half the output from Arcow and Dry Rigg to be railed away from the quarries rather than trucks on the roads through the dales. As the quarry is situated in Upper Ribblesdale, the normal route out was via the B6479 road through the dale. The opening of the rail link is estimated to have cut an annual average of 16,000 lorry journeys from the local road system.

The quarry is worked by blasting, then crushing the rock, which yields 20,000 tonnes (22,000 tons) on average per year. Output permissions from the quarry have dropped significantly since 2013, with the typical output from 2011 and 2012 being 320,000 tonnes (350,000 tons) and 260,000 tonnes (290,000 tons) respectively. In 2021, planning permission was extended for the quarry with over 4,000,000 tonnes (4,400,000 tons) of gritstone expected to be quarried over the 13 years from 2022, allowing restoration in 2035. Afterwards, water will be allowed to fill the 738 feet (225 m) quarry, which is expected to become full some 30 years later. However, the quarry extension plan was left undetermined by a High Court ruling in 2023, which stated that "...the [Yorkshire Dales National Park] Authority had failed to consider the impact of the development of the intrinsic character of the Yorkshire Dales National Park." The appeal to extend the life of the quarry will go before another planning committee meeting in April 2023.

== Owners ==
- 1938 – Walker
- c. 1940 George Greenwood
- 1964 – Redland
- 1998 – Lafarge Aggregates
- 2015 – Tarmac (CRH)

== Local environment ==
The quarry lies adjacent to Swarth Moor SSSI, a bog moorland that was previously cut for fuel. Swarth Moor is noted for its butterfly species, of which 16 different types have been observed, including the Small pearl-bordered fritillary, with Swarth Moor being a key site for this species in the Yorkshire Dales National Park. Dust from the quarrying process has altered the hydrology of Swarth Moor, leading to it drying out in the process. Natural England re-wetted the site in 2019, improving the site for great-crested newts and raining the footpath that runs between Swarth Moor and Dry Rigg. The quarry itself is host to over 20 species of birds, includes ravens, sand martins, and lapwings.
