= Horton in Ribblesdale =

Village and civil parish in North Yorkshire, England

Coordinates: 54°08′39″N 2°17′31″W

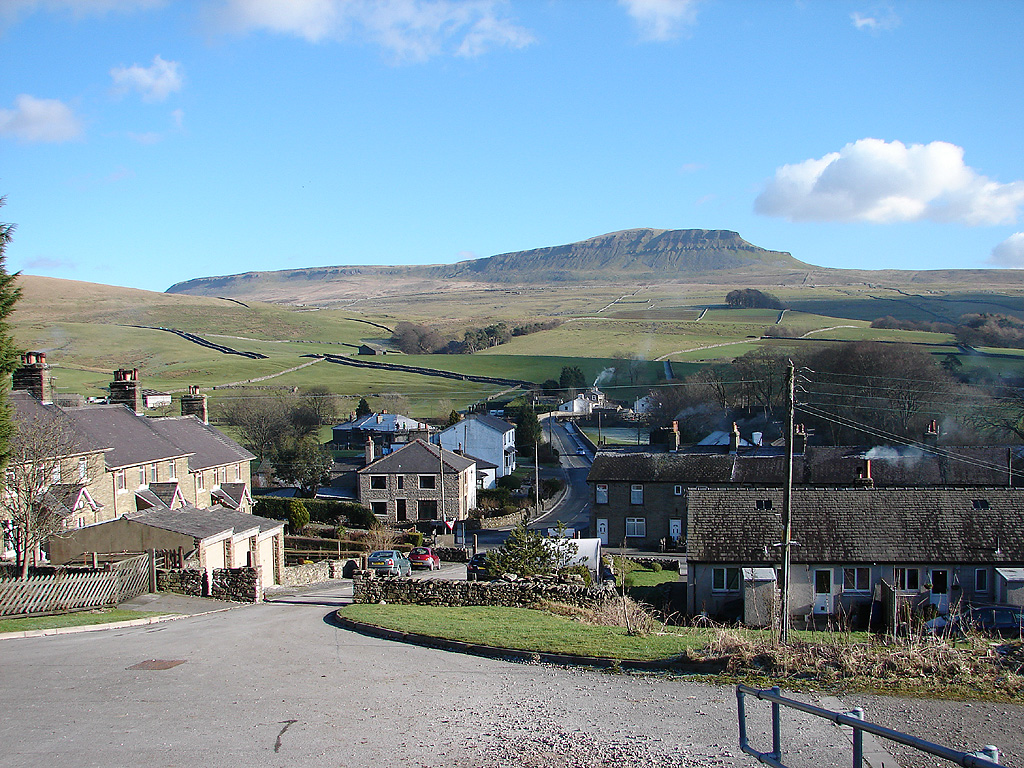
- Horton in Ribblesdale, with Pen-y-ghent in the background

- Location within North Yorkshire
- Population: 428 (2011 census)
- OS grid reference: SD807726
- Unitary authority: North Yorkshire
- Ceremonial county: North Yorkshire
- Region: Yorkshire and the Humber
- Country: England
- Sovereign state: United Kingdom
- Post town: SETTLE
- Postcode district: BD24
- Dialling code: 01729
- Police: North Yorkshire
- Fire: North Yorkshire
- Ambulance: Yorkshire
- UK Parliament: Skipton and Ripon

Horton in Ribblesdale is a small village and civil parish in Ribblesdale in the county of North Yorkshire, England. It is situated on the Settle–Carlisle Railway to the west of Pen-y-ghent.

The parish extends from Helwith Bridge, 2.2 miles (3.5 km) south of the village, to a point 6.5 miles (10.5 km) north of the village. It includes the summits of Pen-y-Ghent and Plover Hill on the east side of the dale, and the summit of Simon Fell to the west. In addition to the village of Horton the parish includes the hamlets of Selside, High Birkwith, Brackenbottom and Studfold. Its population in the 2001 census was 498 people in 211 households; decreasing to 428 at the 2011 Census.

== History ==
It is first attested as Horton in the Domesday Book of 1086, with in Ribblesdale being added already in the 13th century to distinguish it from Horton, Lancashire. The place-name Horton is a common one in England. It derives from Old English horu 'dirt' and tūn 'settlement, farm, estate', presumably meaning 'farm on muddy soil'.

Horton in Ribblesdale was historically a part of Ewcross wapentake in the West Riding of Yorkshire. It became a parish town in the early 12th century when the church of St. Oswald was established. This church was historically associated with the Deanery of Chester, and was part of the Diocese of York – though today it is part of the Diocese of Leeds. The surviving parish records date back to 1556.

In the 13th century the village and parish were ruled by rival monastic orders at Jervaulx Abbey and Fountains Abbey. Their dispute stemmed from a 1220 transfer of property here by William de Mowbray to the Fountains monks, which challenged the primacy of an earlier grant by Henry III to Jervaulx's predecessors at Fors Abbey. Not until 1315 was this dispute firmly settled, when Edward II confirmed the Abbot of Jervaulx as Lord of Horton in Ribblesdale.

During the Dissolution of the Monasteries, the monks' interests at Horton in Ribblesdale was attributed with an annual income of £32 and 5 shillings; and was given to the Earl of Lennox. He, in turn, disposed of the manor lands about 1569 or 1570 to a syndicate consisting of John Lennard, Ralph Scrope, Ralph Rokebie, Sampson Lennard, William Forest, Robert Cloughe and Henry Dyxon.

It seems the manor lands were eventually held solely by the family of John Lennard, the first named member of the syndicate. His daughter Lady Anne Lennard married Sir Leonard Bosville of Bradburne in Kent and together they sold their interests at Horton in Ribblesdale during the reign of Charles II to a partnership consisting of Lawrence Burton, Richard Wigglesworth and Francis Howson.

In 1597 Horton in Ribblesdale, like so much of northern England, was struck by plague. This is confirmed by the parish burial register, which lists 74 deaths that year compared to just 17 deaths during the preceding and succeeding years. Those lost to this pandemic amounted to roughly one-eighth of the parish's population.

In 1725, local squire John Armistead left an endowment to establish a free grammar school here.

== Governance ==
From 1894 to 1974 Horton was part of Settle Rural District in the West Riding of Yorkshire. In 1974 it was transferred to Craven District in the new county of North Yorkshire. From 1974 to 2023 it was part of the Craven District, it is now administered by the unitary North Yorkshire Council.

== Visitor attractions ==
Horton in Ribblesdale is the traditional starting (and finishing) point for the Three Peaks walk. The Pennine Way and Ribble Way long-distance footpaths pass through the village.

The region is also popular for caving and potholing, with Alum Pot and the Long Churn cave system just to the north of the village, and Hull Pot and Hunt Pot on the western side of Pen-y-ghent.

The Three Peaks walk is an endurance challenge of 26 miles (41.8 km) distance, including 5,000 feet (1,524 m) of ascent and descent of the mountains of Pen-y-ghent, Whernside and Ingleborough all to be completed in under 12 hours which attracts thousands of walkers each year. The circuit is also used for a fell race in April, while the Three Peaks cyclo-cross race also visits the three summits in the course of a longer 37.9 miles (61 km) route on the last Sunday in September. Participants in both the running and cycling race regularly achieve winning times of around three hours, and sometimes both races in the year are won by the same competitor.

== Local architecture and amenities ==
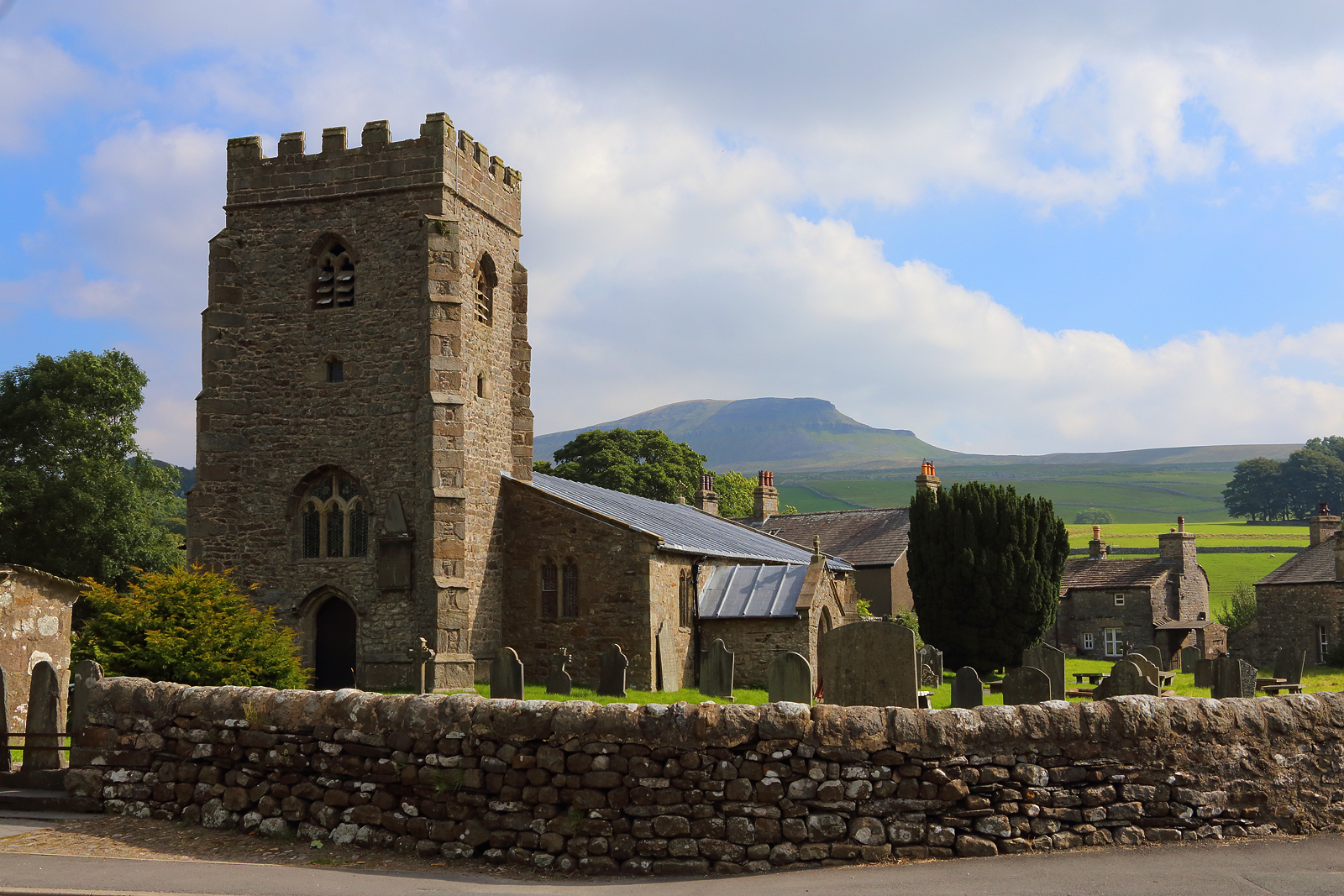
St Oswald's Church, Horton in Ribblesdale

The village has two pubs, the Crown Hotel and the Golden Lion. In 2006 a villager controversially installed a radio telescope.

St Oswald's Church, Horton in Ribblesdale is Grade I listed. It has a complete Norman nave, south door and tub-font and is the most complete of the Norman churches built in the Yorkshire Dales after the Norman conquest and the Harrying of the North that followed. The square tower was built later. The lychgates to enter the churchyard are roofed with slabs of Horton slate.

Other buildings in Horton are typical of the area. 17th-century yeomen's farmhouses can be found on the edge of the village, and later cottages can be seen nearer the centre of the village. In the 1870s the new railway prompted the building of Victorian terraced housing. Later the local quarrying of limestone led to the building of housing for the quarrymen.

Local quarries are in operation to mine limestone at Horton Quarry and gritstone at Arcow quarry.

== Gallery ==
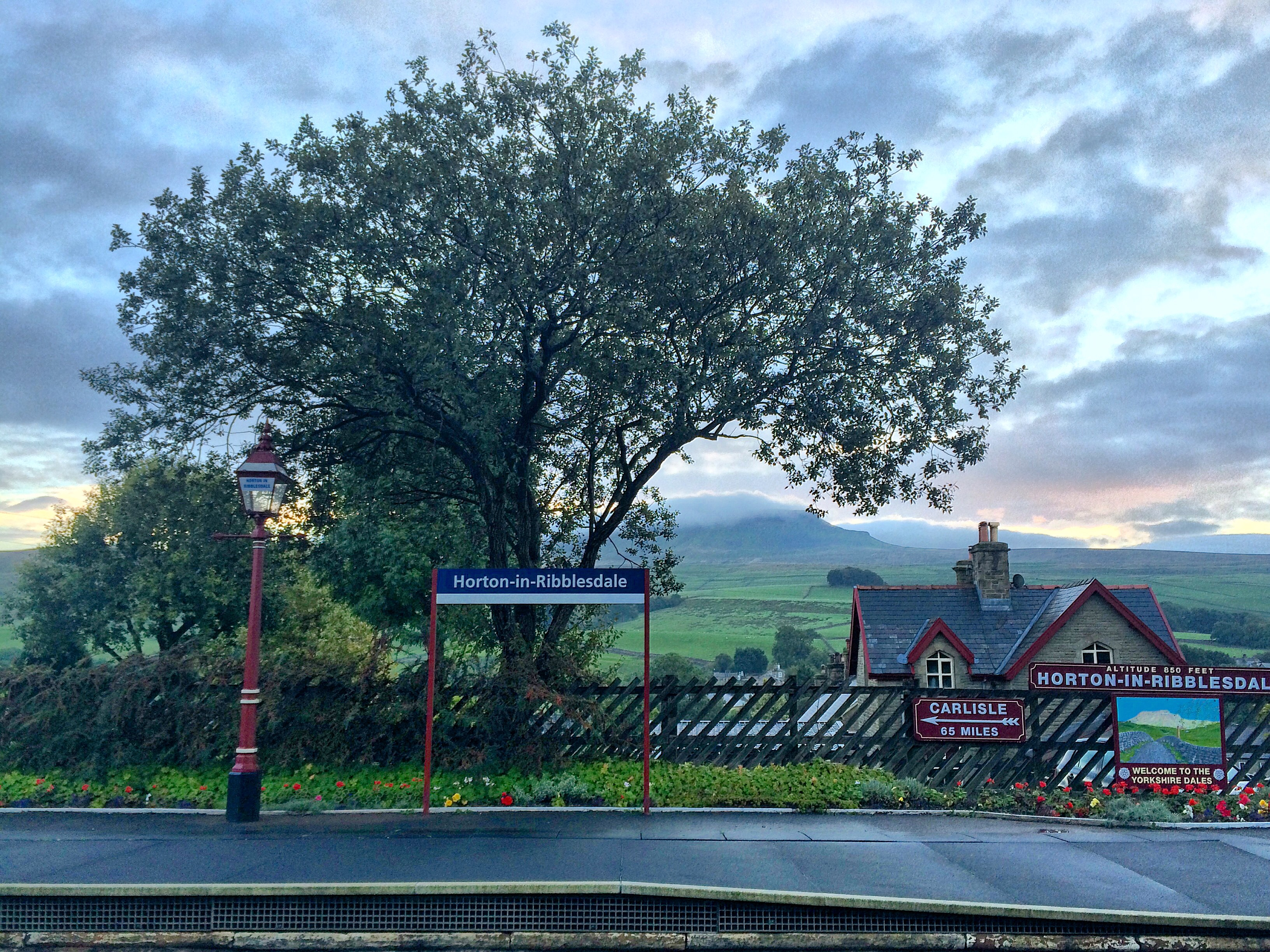
Horton in Ribblesdale railway station

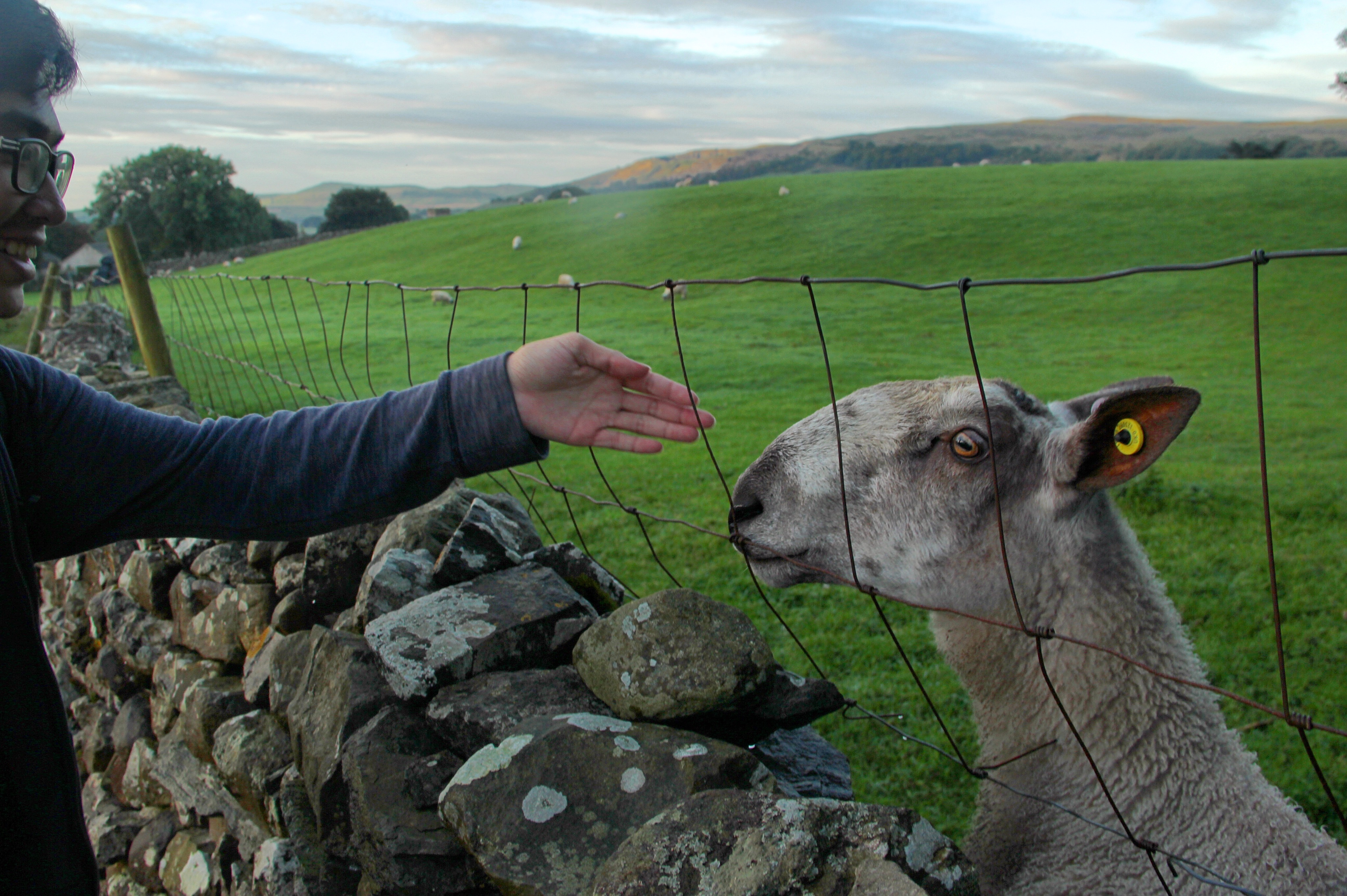
Sheep in Horton in Ribblesdale

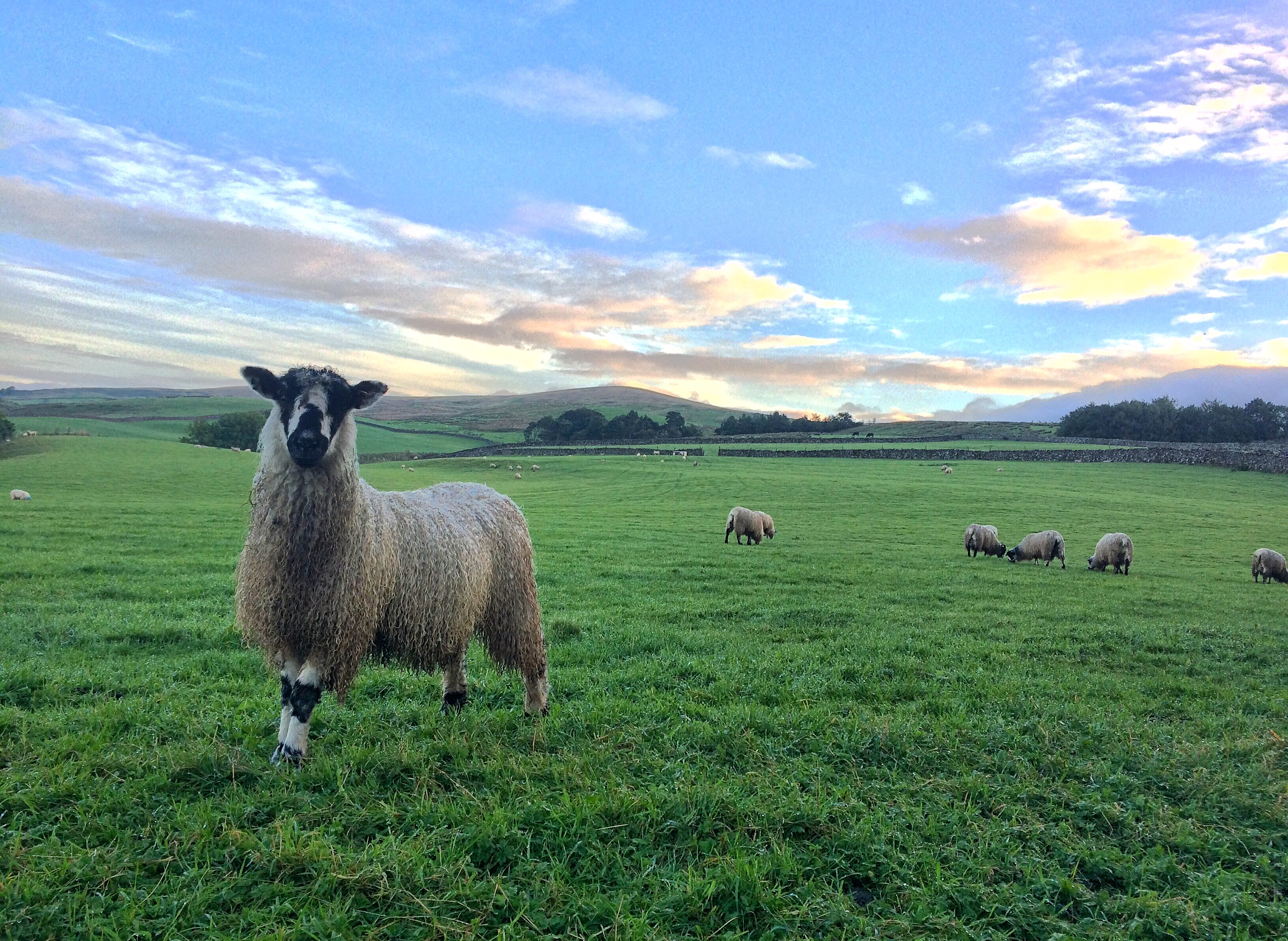
Horton in Ribblesdale

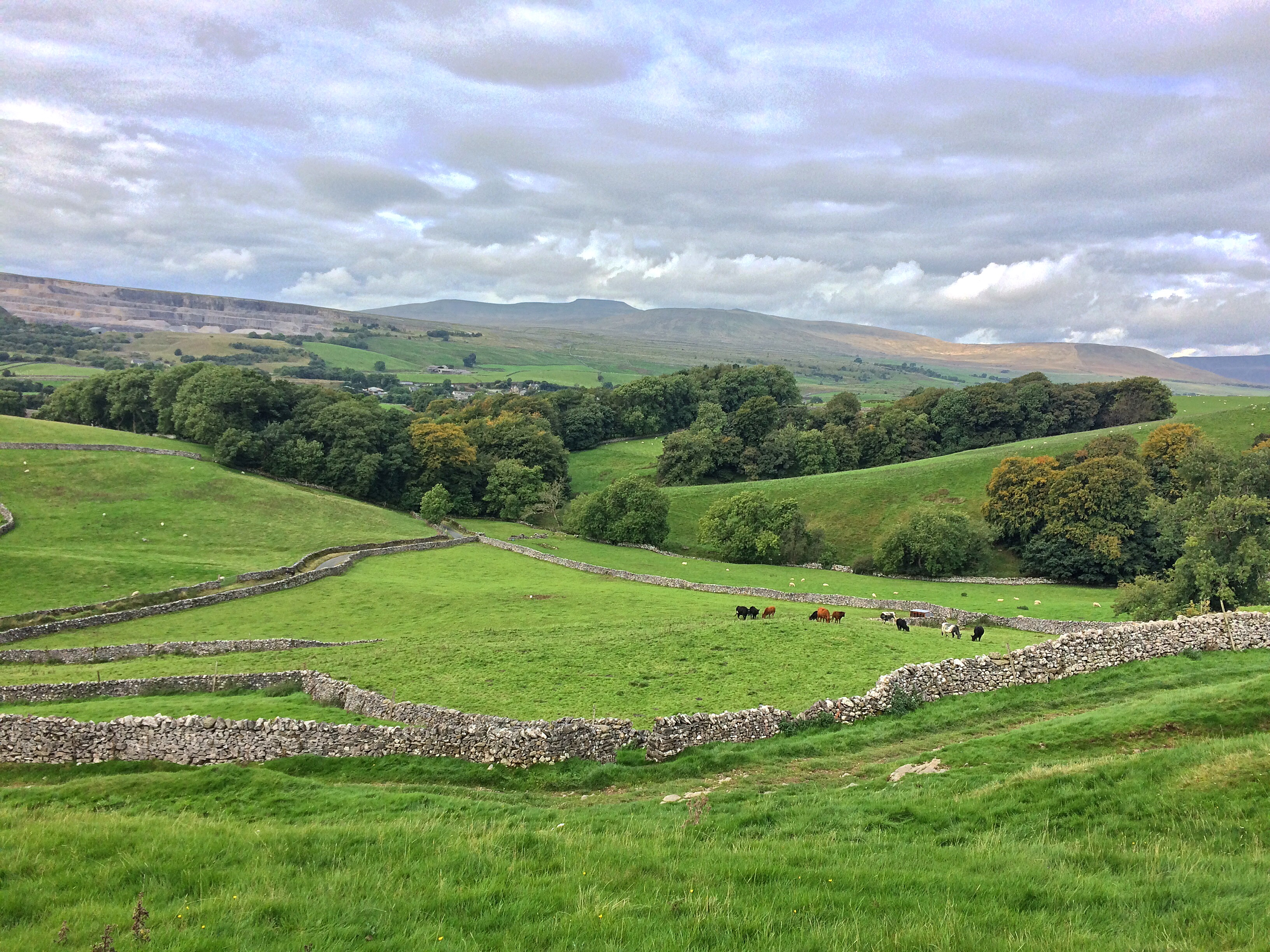
Horton in Ribblesdale

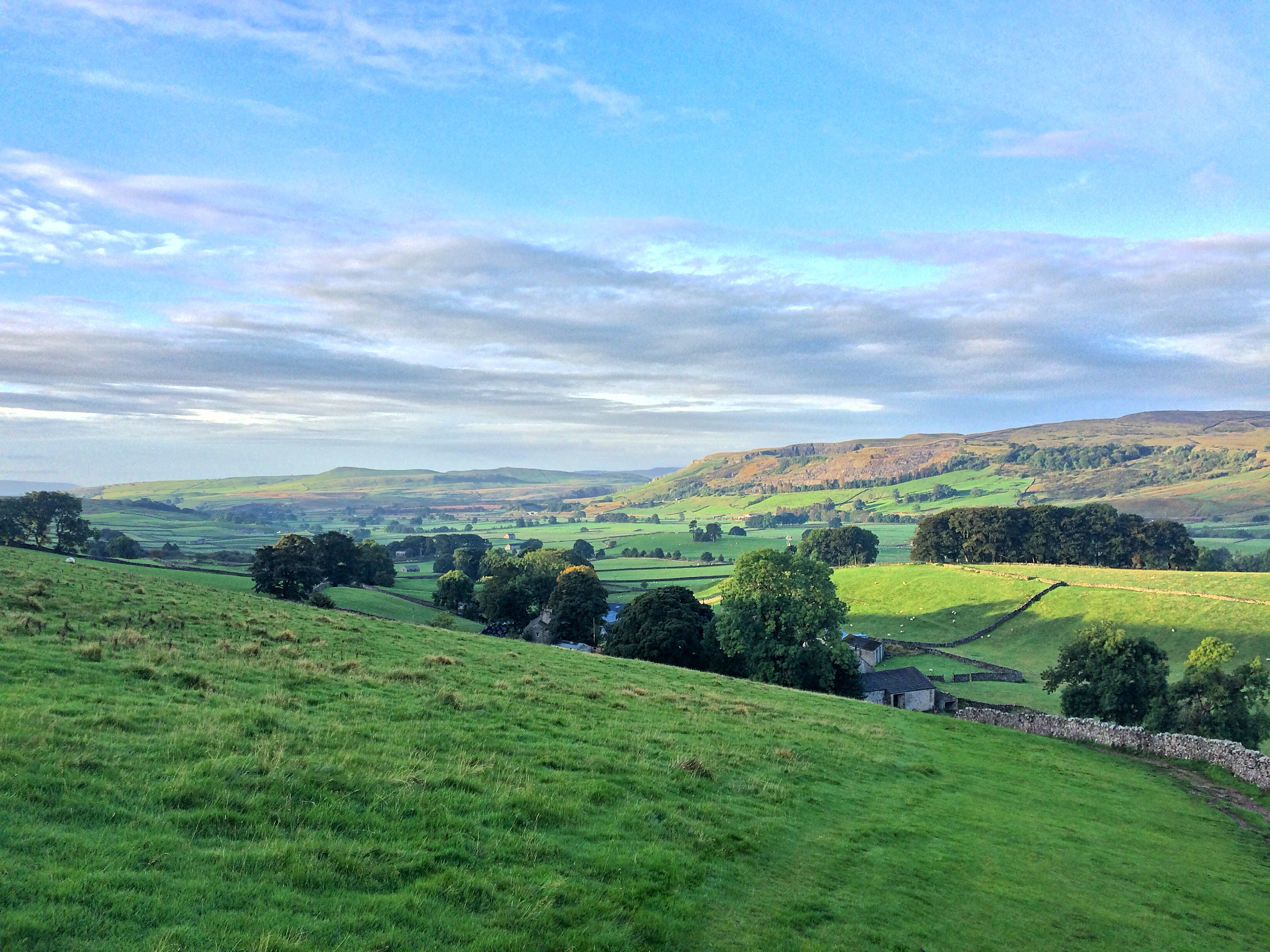
Horton in Ribblesdale from Pen-y-ghent

== See also ==
- Listed buildings in Horton in Ribblesdale
- Horton-in-Ribblesdale railway station
