= Langcliffe Pot =

Cave system in North Yorkshire

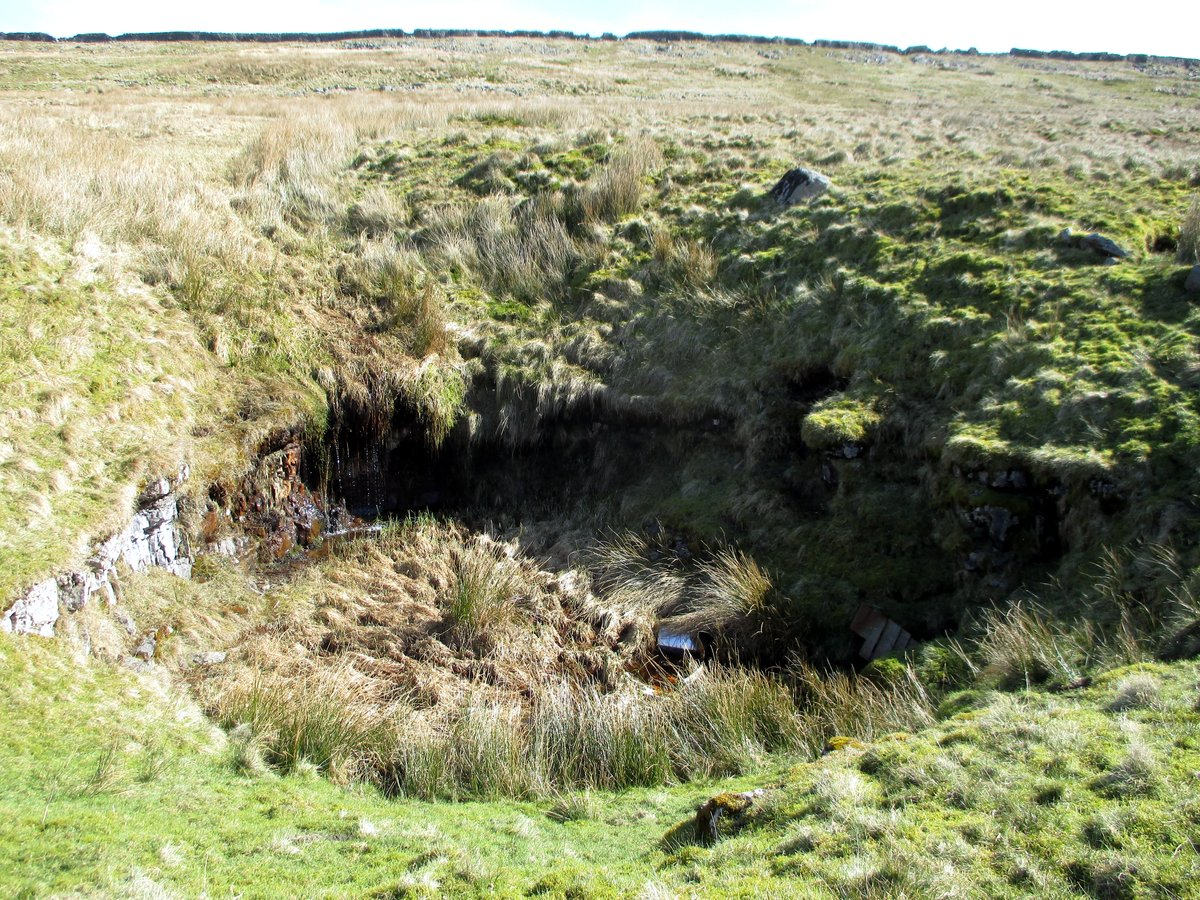
- Oddmire Pot entrance shakehole

- Location within North Yorkshire
- Location: Great Whernside, North Yorkshire, UK
- OS grid: SD 9958 7107
- Coordinates: 54°08′08″N 2°00′29″W
- Depth: 116 metres (381 ft)
- Length: 9.6 kilometres (6.0 mi)
- Elevation: 488 metres (1,601 ft)
- Discovery: 1936
- Geology: Yoredales Limestone
- Entrances: 2
- Difficulty: V
- Hazards: water, loose boulders
- Access: None
- Cave survey: ULSA survey on Cavemaps

Langcliffe Pot is a cave system on the slopes of Great Whernside in Upper Wharfedale, about 3 kilometres (1.9 mi) SSE of Kettlewell in North Yorkshire. It is part of the Black Keld Site of Special Scientific Interest where the "underground drainage system which feeds the stream resurgence at Black Keld is one of the largest and deepest in Britain, although only a small proportion of its cave passages are accessible at present." Mossdale Caverns is also part of the Black Keld SSSI. Although a considerable length of passage has been explored in Langcliffe Pot, the current end is over 170 metres (560 ft) above the resurgence, and over 4 kilometres (2.5 mi) in distance. A trip to the far end has been described as "one of the most serious undertakings in British caving".

Lancliffe Pot from Southwest

== Description ==
The entrance lies within a shakehole where a small hole between blocks leads to a ledge at the top of a 26-metre (85 ft) shaft. This lands in a chamber with a narrow rift passage leading off which degenerates into the Craven Crawl, 200 metres (660 ft) of low, wet passage. At a junction with an inlet, the passage enlarges into Stagger Passage, 600 metres (2,000 ft) of walking and stooping. At the start of a deep canal it passes a passage on the left which is the main way to the alternative entrance of Oddmire Pot. The canal passage continues to meet a major junction at Hammerdale Dub, where over 1,000 metres (3,300 ft) of upstream passages also lead back towards Oddmire Pot. Downstream, 1,500 metres (4,900 ft) of boulder-strewn streamway finishes where the water disappears under a wall, but a small passage leads into Boireau Falls Chamber, at the base of which it is possible to regain the stream. This finishes at Nemesis, a 20-metre (66 ft) shaft below which a route through a tight and complex boulder choke leads into Gasson's Series. This is initially a high streamway which degenerates into a low wet section, beyond which the passage continues for 100 metres (330 ft) before arriving at Poseidon Sump, which has been dived for some 20 metres (66 ft) to where it becomes small. Back at the low pool, a dry inlet passage of fine rift passage and chambers continues for over 1,100 metres (3,600 ft) before decreasing in size, and dropping into the large New Fearnought Streamway. Downstream leads to Dementor Sump, which has been dived for 20 metres (66 ft) to a blockage. Upstream terminates in a boulder blockage after 230 metres (750 ft).

Oddmire Pot (54.138109°N 2.011044°W) is located 350 m (1,150 ft) north-west of Langcliffe Pot. A small hole in a shakehole leads on to a broken 17-metre (56 ft) shaft. At the base of this, Strid Passage continues as a crawling/stooping passage for about 500 m (1,600 ft) before joining Stagger Passage from Langcliffe Pot. An obscure inlet about 150 m (490 ft) from the beginning leads into The Roads, an alternative and longer route to Hammerdale Dub.

== Geology and hydrology ==
Langcliffe Pot is a solutional cave formed within rocks of the Yoredale Series of the Pendlian and Brigantian substages of the Mississippian epoch of the Carboniferous period. The Yoredale Group consists of a number of cyclothems, with sequences of sandstones, shales, and thin coals separating limestones into well-defined beds separated by aquicludes. The upper part of the cave is formed at the base of the Middle Limestone, and the passages run down dip towards the south-east, floored by sandstone. In Boireau Falls Chamber, the stream cuts through the 50-centimetre (20 in) sandstone bed, and then through 4 metres (13 ft) of shale into the Simonstone Limestone. Nemesis Pitch drops straight through this, and the Gassson Series is formed totally within the Hardraw Limestone. The resurgence at Black Keld, some 174 metres (571 ft) below the lowest point of Langcliffe Pot, lies in the Great Scar Limestone.

Langcliffe Pot falls within the 20,000-hectare (49,000-acre) Black Keld catchment area. Most of the drainage within the catchment feeds into Mossdale Beck, which sinks into the limestone at Mossdale Scar. Langcliffe Pot is fed by a few small streams that drain an area of the flanks of Great Whernside about 500 metres (1,600 ft) wide. The water then drains down dip in the general direction of Mossdale. The waters of Mossdale Caverns and Langcliffe Pot combine at some unknown point, and resurge at Black Keld. Black Keld has been penetrated by divers for about 2 kilometres (1.2 mi)—well short of Langcliffe Pot.

== History ==
Langcliffe Pot was first spotted in December 1935 by members of the Craven Pothole Club (CPC), and they made the first descent the following April when the first 45 metres (148 ft) of traverse in the downstream passage was explored to a pool. Soon after, they dye-tested the Langcliffe Pot and Rigg Pot streams and various others to Black Keld. Another party from the same club descended in 1954 and pushed on for a further 400 metres (1,300 ft) along what is now known as Craven Crawl before turning back. In August 1968 a team from the Yorkshire Underground Research Team explored over 1 kilometre (0.62 mi) beyond the CPC limit as far as the Kilnsey Boulder Crawl. They were not too impressed with the place, and handed over the baton to the University of Leeds Speleological Society (ULSA). Over the next three months, ULSA explored and surveyed the main stream passage as far as Boireau Falls Chamber, and all the major inlets, giving a total system length of 6.4 kilometres (4.0 mi). The next phase of exploration took place in 1970 when the choke in Boireau Falls Chamber was excavated and Nemesis Pitch discovered. A week later a route was found through the complex boulder choke at the bottom and a further 2 kilometres (1.2 mi) of passages discovered. In June 1972 the system flooded whilst an ULSA diving team were on the far side of the Nemesis boulder choke, trapping them and resulting in a major rescue call-out. The party emerged unscathed after a 44-hour-long trip. A second major rescue occurred in 1974 when five cavers became trapped on the far side of the Nemesis Choke after boulder movement.

== See also ==
- List of caves in the United Kingdom
