= Boulder choke =

Collection of large rocks or rubble that obstructs the passage of a cave or mine

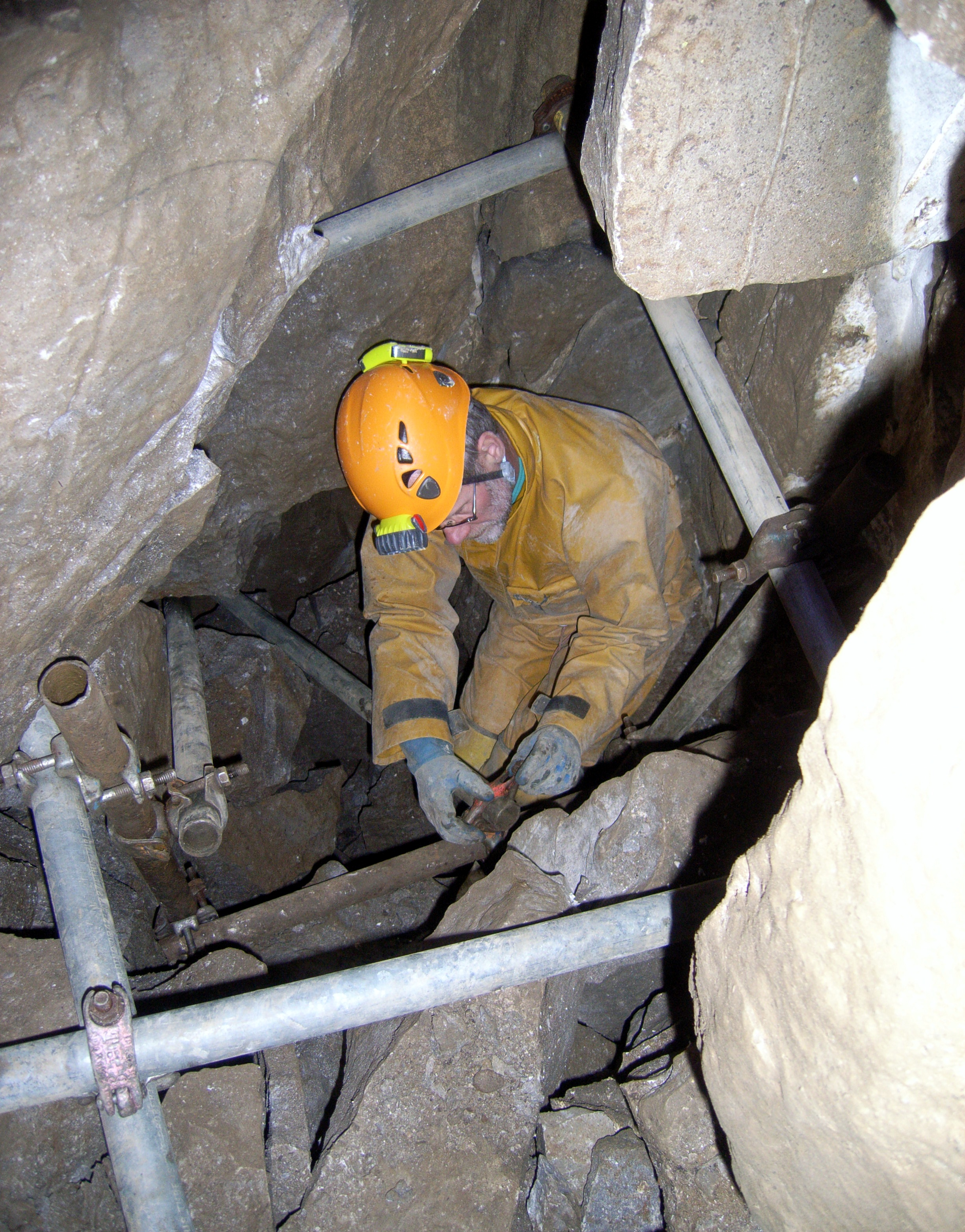
A caver clearing a boulder choke in Stile Pot, Gaping Gill

A boulder choke or breakdown plug is a collection of large rocks or rubble that obstructs a shaft or passage in a cave or mine. In order to progress through passages cavers often need to negotiate or clear boulder chokes.

Boulder chokes can be formed by rockfall, stream deposition, or mining debris. Due to the nature of their formation boulder chokes may be unstable and can prove difficult to navigate and map due to their complexity.

In order to clear a boulder choke the rocks obstructing the passage may need to be removed, often requiring breaking up first either mechanically or using a small explosive. The Three Counties System became the longest cave in the UK when cavers succeeded in clearing a route through a boulder choke for 140 metres (460 ft) to connect two known cave systems, an exercise that took three years.

Boulder chokes can be hazardous, as unstable boulders can unexpectedly move, potentially crushing or trapping cavers. In May 1988, for example, three cavers were killed in a boulder choke in Ease Gill Caverns. In caves prone to flooding, a narrow and contorted path through a boulder choke can fill up with water quickly, preventing progress. In 1972, ten members of the University of Leeds Speleological Association were trapped behind a complex flooded boulder choke in Langcliffe Pot, resulting in a 44-hour-long trip.
