= Black Keld Catchment =

Protected area in North Yorkshire, England

Coordinates: 54.126755°N 1.9877235°W

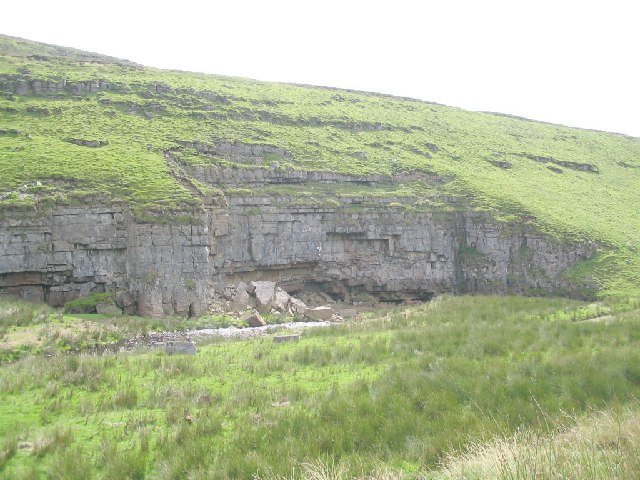
Mossdale Caverns

Black Keld Catchment is a Site of Special Scientific Interest (SSSI) within Yorkshire Dales National Park in North Yorkshire, England. It is located 1.2 miles (2 km) south-east of the village of Kettlewell, to the east of Wharfedale. This protected area includes major cave systems (Langcliffe Pot and Mossdale Caverns) and this protected area encompasses parts of Conistone Moor and Grassington Moor. This area is protected because of the unusual geology of the underground cave systems.

Black Keld Catchment SSSI is adjacent to Upper Wharfedale SSSI, and so forms part of a wider area of nature protection.

== Geology ==
The two cave systems (Langcliffe Pot and Mossdale Caverns) include over 20 km of cave passages. These cave systems are unique in the way parts of the drainage is constrained within Yoredale limestones and then passes through to underlying Great Scar Limestone. These cave systems pass through the intervening shales and sandstones that in other places form an impermeable layer. Such breaches of these impermeable rocks are due to streams forming routes through tectonic fissures, faults and fractures. The breakthrough from the Middle Limestone into the Simonstone Limestone occurs via a canyon within a vadose zone.

Langcliffe Pot and Mossdale Caverns have complex reticulate cave passages that are unusual for sites in Yoredale Limestones which more typically have a single stream passage.
