= Kilnsey =

Village in North Yorkshire, England

Coordinates: 54°06′23″N 2°02′30″W

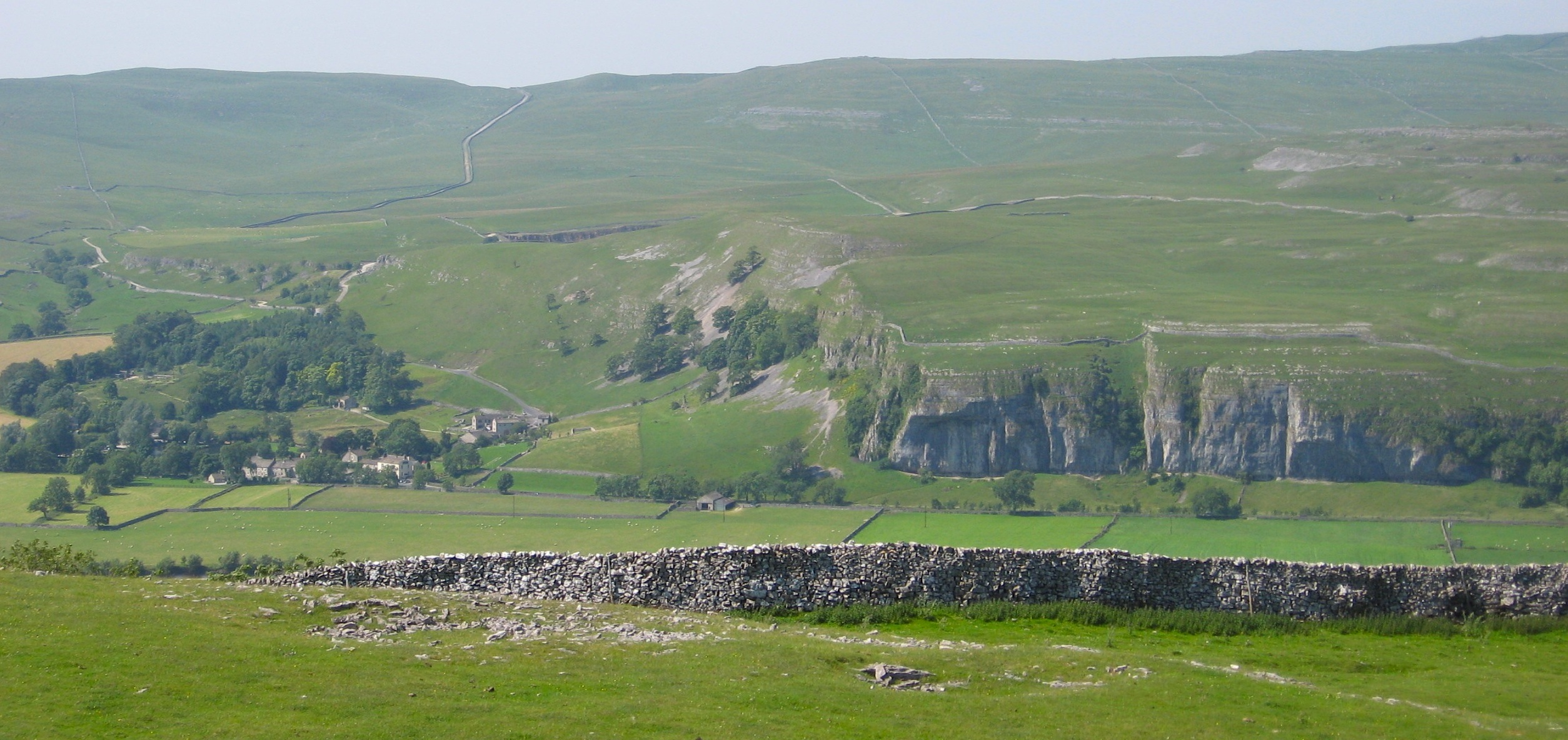
- Kilnsey and Crag over Wharfedale, from Conistone Pie: Mastiles Lane, left

- Location within North Yorkshire
- OS grid reference: SD973678
- Civil parish: Conistone with Kilnsey
- Unitary authority: North Yorkshire
- Ceremonial county: North Yorkshire
- Region: Yorkshire and the Humber
- Country: England
- Sovereign state: United Kingdom
- Post town: SKIPTON
- Postcode district: BD23
- Police: North Yorkshire
- Fire: North Yorkshire
- Ambulance: Yorkshire
- UK Parliament: Skipton and Ripon

Kilnsey is a small village in Wharfedale, North Yorkshire, England. It lies on the B6160 road, between the villages of Grassington and Kettlewell, near Arncliffe and just across the River Wharfe from Conistone. The village is 12 miles (19 km) north of Skipton and 3 miles (5 km) south of Kettlewell.

== History ==
The village is mentioned in the Domesday Book of 1086 as Chilsie when it was described as waste. Soon after the Domesday Book had been completed, the lands in and around Kilnsey were given to Edulf de Culnese. The derivation of the name is believed to come from Kyle and Ea, which means the chilly stream.

The most notable feature of Kilnsey is a large limestone cliff called Kilnsey Crag, overlooking the road and the River Wharfe from the west. The crag is around 170 feet high, with an overhang of 40 feet. It was painted by J. M. W. Turner in 1816. The crag contains several of Britain's most extreme sport climbing routes, such as Northern Lights 9a (5.14d), and North Star 9a (5.14d), by Steve McClure. To the west of the crag is the site of Cool Scar Quarry, which produced lime and magnesia from c. 1880 to 1998.

West from Kilnsey towards Malham Tarn runs the historic Mastiles Lane, a Roman marching road, later an important route for monks leading sheep from Fountains Abbey to summer pasture on higher ground. This is now a Dales walking track.

The village of Kilnsey is a small collection of stone-built Yorkshire Dales cottages, many dating back to the 1600s. Kilnsey Old Hall is believed to have been a medieval administrative site for the monks of Fountains Abbey who farmed flocks of sheep in the area. Most of the present building dates from 1648.

Kilnsey Park is a visitor attraction and fishing lake that was established in 1978 by the Roberts family. The park offers attractions including fishing, a nature trail and farm animals. There is also a working fish farm, smokehouse, and cafe.

Kilnsey has one pub, the Tennant Arms, named after the Tennant family of Chapel House (on the site of an ancient chapel belonging to Kilnsey Grange, a possession of Fountains Abbey) which owned the Kilnsey Estate from 1572 to 1911.

Each autumn the village hosts Kilnsey Show, one of the largest one-day agricultural shows in the country. The show was officially established in 1897 and regularly attracts over 12,000 visitors, though records dating back to the mid-1800s tell of harness racing and the fell race having been run for most of that century. The timing of the show has been linked as possibly tying in with the saint's day for St Mary's Church in nearby Conistone. One of the highlights is the Kilnsey Crag Race, a distance of 1–1.2 miles (1.6–1.9 km) and a climb of 330 feet (100 m) which dashes up and down the side of the crag.

On 5 July 2014, the Tour de France Stage 1 from Leeds to Harrogate passed through the village.

=== Old Nan ===
Old Nan was allegedly a witch living under Kilnsey Crag and well known locally. She was known as far as Skipton, where she had a stand in the market.

== See also ==
- Listed buildings in Conistone with Kilnsey

== Gallery ==
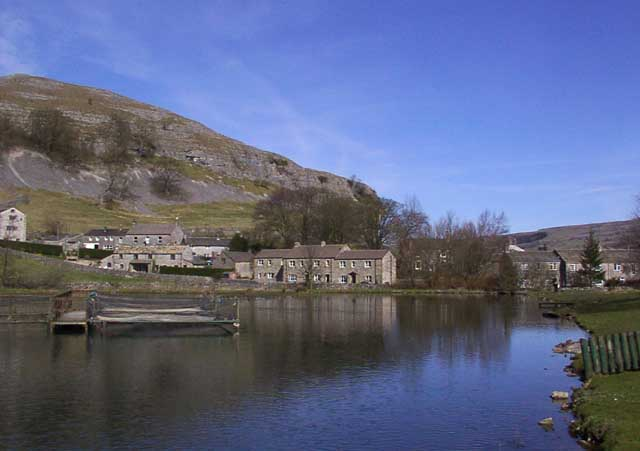
Kilnsey Crag

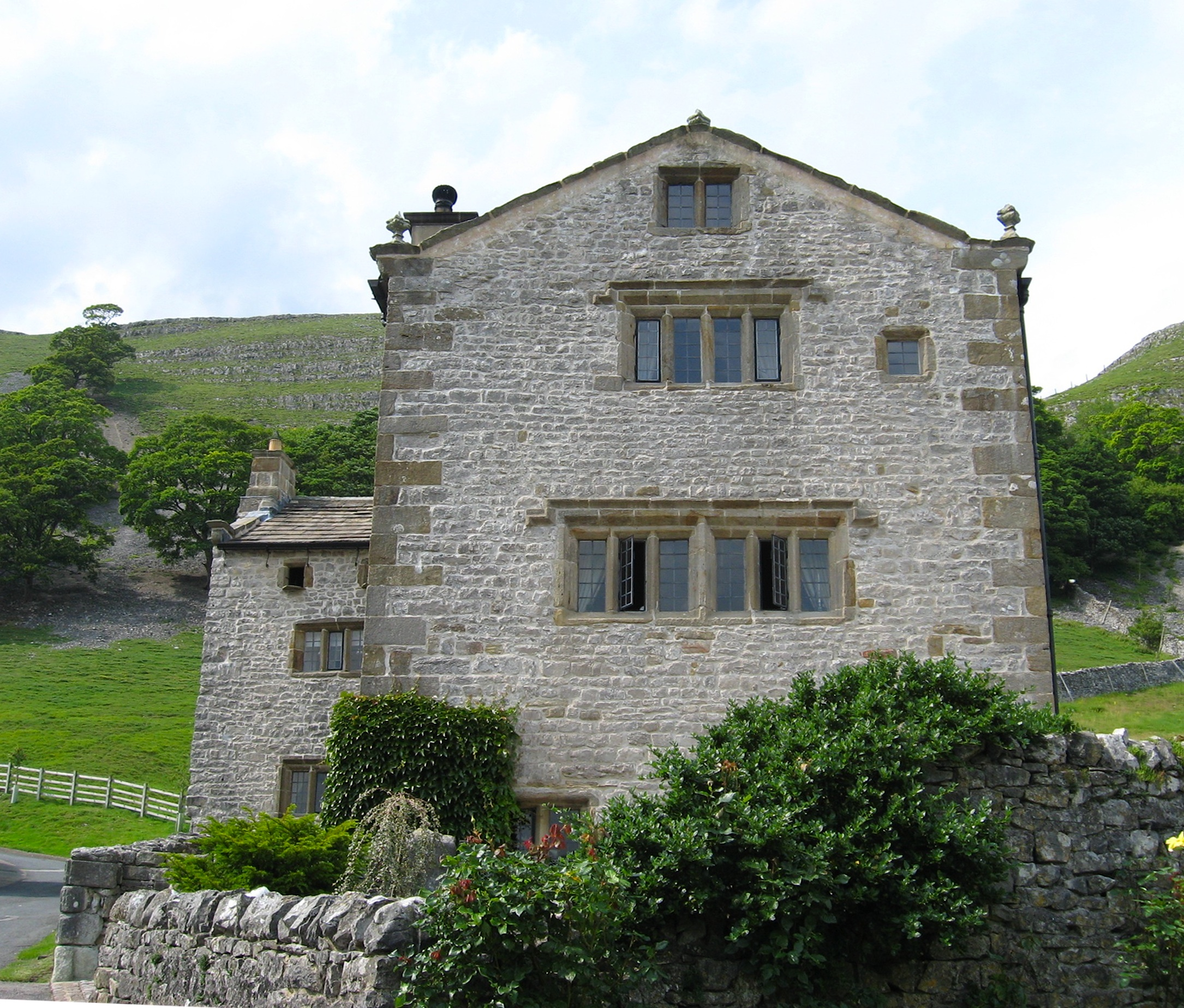
Old Hall

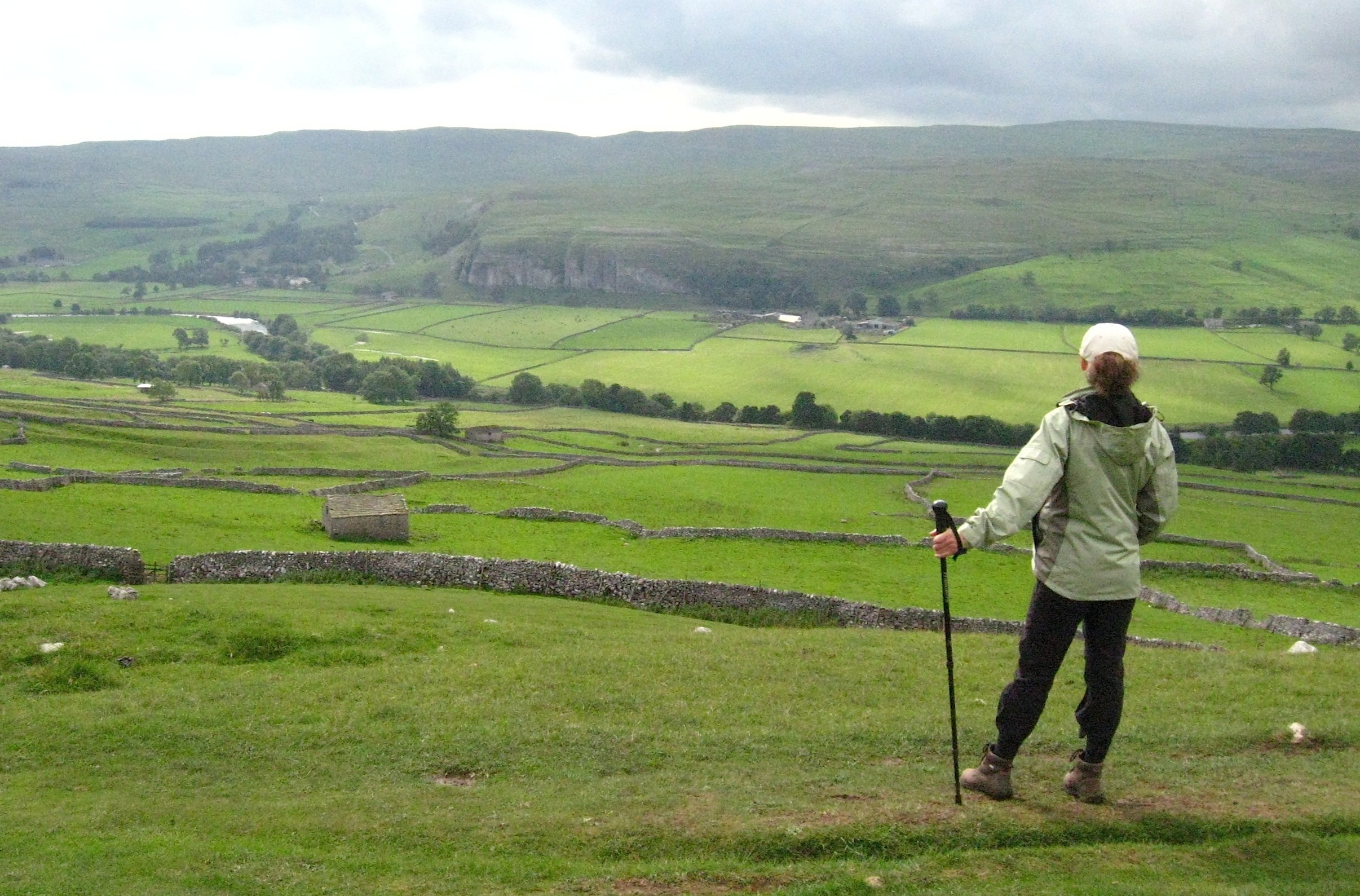
Kilnsey Crag above River Wharfe, across Wharfedale

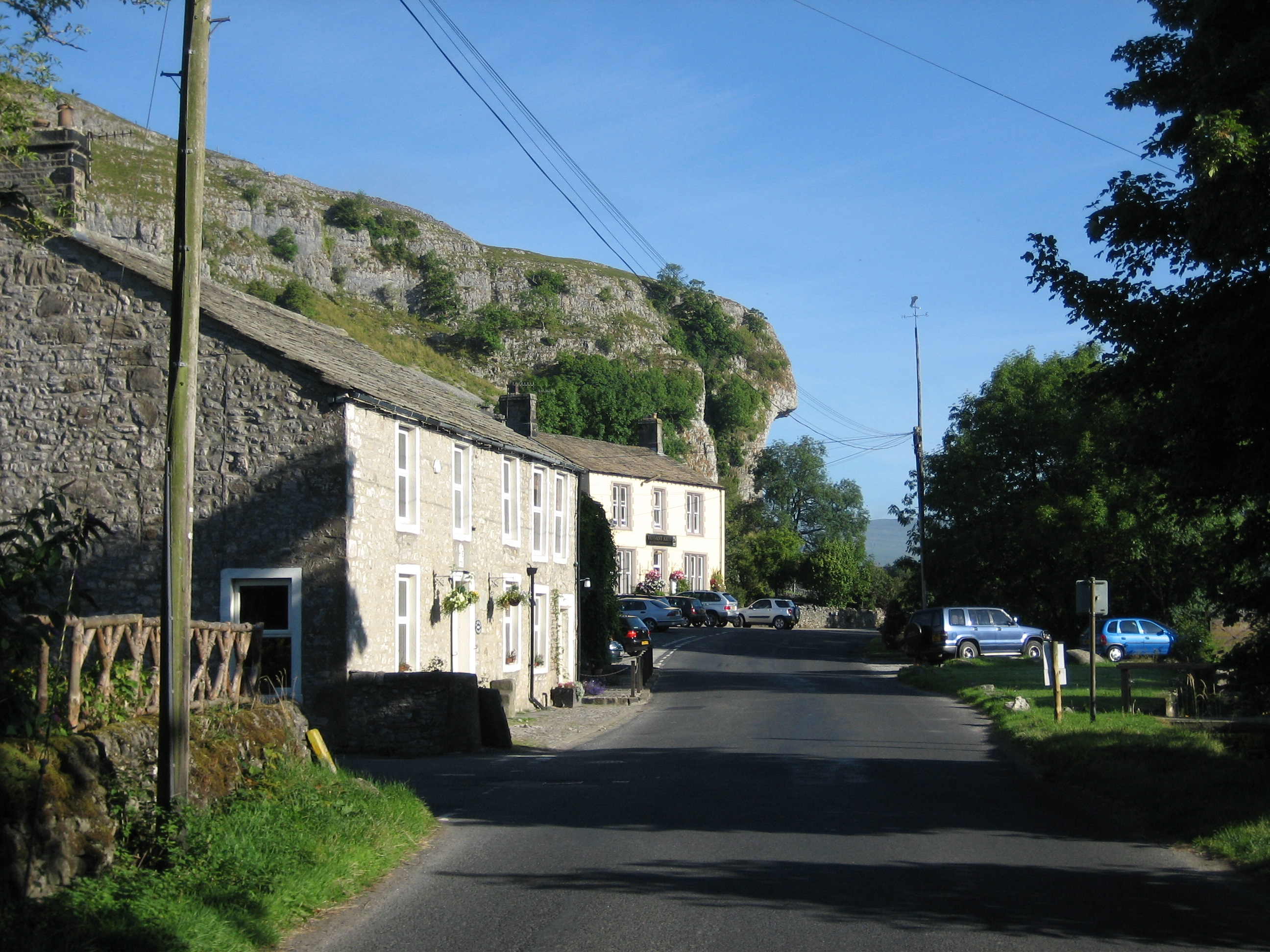
Kilnsey
