= Listed buildings in Conistone with Kilnsey =

Conistone with Kilnsey is a civil parish in the county of North Yorkshire, England. It contains 21 listed buildings that are recorded in the National Heritage List for England. Of these, one is listed at Grade II*, the middle of the three grades, and the others are at Grade II, the lowest grade. The parish contains the villages of Conistone and Kilnsey and the surrounding countryside. Most of the listed buildings are houses, cottages and associated structures, farmhouses and farm buildings, and the others consist of a church, chest tombs in the churchyard, two bridges and a telephone kiosk.

== Key ==
Grade	Criteria
II*	Particularly important buildings of more than special interest
II	Buildings of national importance and special interest

== Buildings ==
Name and location	Photograph	Date	Notes	Grade
St Mary's Church, Conistone; 54.10396°N 2.03060°W		11th or 12th century	The church was partly rebuilt in 1846 by Sharpe and Paley retaining earlier features, and is in Norman style. It is built in limestone with gritstone dressings and a stone slate roof. The church consists of a nave with a south porch, a north aisle, and a lower chancel with a north vestry. On the west gable is a bellcote with two moulded arches and a gable. The porch is gabled, and contains a round-arched doorway with a hood mould, and the windows are lancets with round heads.	II
Topham's Farmhouse; 54.10307°N 2.03094°W	—	1630	The farmhouse is in limestone with gritstone dressings, quoins, and a stone slate roof. There are two storeys, five bays and a rear outshut. The doorway has a chamfered quoined surround, a narrow triangular head, and a large lintel containing a recessed panel with the date and initials. There is an external staircase providing a hood to the doorway carried on a massive corbel. The windows have chamfered surrounds, some have mullions, some mullions have been removed, and some windows have hood moulds.	II
Kilnsey Old Hall; 54.10650°N 2.04236°W		1648	A house in limestone on a chamfered plinth, with gritstone dressings, quoins, and a stone slate roof, hipped on the right and with moulded gable coping and kneelers with vase finials elsewhere. There is an L-shaped plan, the main range with four bays, three storeys and an attic, reducing on a slope to two storeys and an attic, and a rear wing with three storeys and one bay. In the northeast front is a doorway with chamfered quoined jambs, a cart entrance with a segmental arch and a keystone, a doorway with moulded quoined jambs and an arched lintel with initials and the date, and a flight of external steps leading to a doorway with a chamfered quoined surround. Most of the windows are recessed, chamfered and mullioned.	II*
Chapel northwest of Kilnsey Old Hall; 54.10662°N 2.04258°W		1648	The chapel, later used as a farm building, is in limestone, with gritstone dressings, quoins, a stone slate roof and two storeys. In the south gable front is a doorway with a triangular head, and a recessed window with a chamfered surround. The east front has a doorway with a triangular head and a loft doorway approached by stone steps; all the doorways have moulded surrounds.	II
The Old Hall, Cottage and wall 54.10224°N 2.02938°W		1657	A house, later divided, in limestone, rendered on the front, with gritstone dressings, and a stone slate roof. There are two storeys, three bays, and gabled rear wings. On the front is a gabled porch containing a doorway with a chamfered surround and an initialled and dated lintel, and to the left is a doorway with stone jambs and a narrow corniced lintel. The windows are sashes, some with moulded architraves, and at the rear is a semicircular former stair turret. The garden wall is about 1 metre (3 ft 3 in) high, it has ridged coping, and contains a narrow gateway.	II
Renard Close Laithe; 54.10313°N 2.04548°W	—	1661	A field barn in stone with quoins, a stone slate roof, and a T-shaped plan. The northeast gable contains a loft opening, and in the northwest front is a blocked doorway with a chamfered surround and an initialled and dated lintel. In the southwest gable front is a window flanked by doorways with chamfered surrounds and an owl hole, and the southeast front has a doorway with a chamfered surround, and a loft opening.	II
Crag Cottage; 54.10654°N 2.04149°W	—	Mid to late 17th century	The house is in limestone with gritstone dressings, quoins, a moulded string course, and a stone slate roof with coped gables. There are two storeys and three bays. The doorway has dressed jambs and lintels. Most of the windows are recessed, chamfered and mullioned, and there is a sash window with a plain surround.	II
Gatehouse, Kilnsey Old Hall; 54.10648°N 2.04212°W	—	Late 17th century (probable)	The gatehouse, which has been partly demolished, is in limestone on a chamfered stone plinth, with gritstone dressings, quoins, a moulded string course, and a stone slate roof. In the east front is a recessed three-light chamfered mullioned window, the lights with round heads, and in the north front is a doorway with a chamfered surround and a triangular head.	II
Old Northcote Farmhouse; 54.11263°N 2.04068°W	—	Late 17th century	The farmhouse, which was remodelled in the 18th century, is in limestone, with quoins and a stone slate roof. There are two storeys and three bays. In the centre is a doorway and a gabled latticed porch, with a small window to the right. There is a blocked round-headed window to the right, and the other windows are casements in plain surrounds.	II
Renshaw Farm Cottage; 54.10297°N 2.03071°W		Late 17th century (or earlier)	The house is in limestone with gritstone dressings, quoins, and a stone slate roof. There are two storeys and four bays. On the front is a doorway with chamfered quoined jambs, to the left is a doorway with tie-stone jambs, and on the right are double doors with quoined jambs. Most of the windows are mullioned, and there is a round-headed window with a chamfered surround. On the left bay is an external staircase to a doorway with tie-stone jambs.	II
Hemplands Farmhouse; 54.10206°N 2.02962°W	—	1694	The house is in limestone, with dressings in sandstone and gritstone, quoins, and a stone slate roof. There are two storeys and three bays, the right two bays projecting under a lean-to roof, with a porch in the angle. In the porch is a doorway with moulded quoined jambs, an initialled and dated lintel and a hood mould. In the middle bay are two sash windows, the lower one horizontally-sliding, and the right bay contains a round-headed stair window with imposts and a keystone. At the rear is a doorway in a sandstone architrave with moulded jambs, a circular motif in the spandrels, a pulvinated frieze and a moulded cornice.	II
Renshaw Farmhouse; 54.10280°N 2.03088°W	—	1705	The farmhouse, which was altered in the 19th century, is in limestone, with dressings in gritstone and sandstone, quoins, and a stone slate roof. There are two storeys and two bays, the right bay projecting as a large gabled wing. The doorway has a moulded quoined surround, the moulding stepping up over the lintel, above which is a square plaque with initials and a date. The windows vary, some with chamfered mullions and hood moulds, and others with plain or chamfered surrounds.	II
Angler's Cottage; 54.10602°N 2.04014°W	—	1708	An inn, later a house, in limestone, with quoins and a stone slate roof. There are two storeys and five bays. In the second bay is a doorway with a plain surround and a fanlight, above which is an initialled datestone, and in the right bay is a doorway with a chamfered quoined surround. The windows are rectangular with plain surrounds, and are a mix of sashes and casements.	II
Barn at SD 9813 6744; 54.10286°N 2.02999°W		Early 18th century (probable)	The barn is in limestone with quoins and a stone slate roof. There are three bays, and on the front is a cart entrance with a massive lintel. At the rear is a doorway and a row of pigeon holes. The left return contains a door with a chamfered quoined surround and a shallow-arched lintel, a door with a slight lintel and a pitching hole above, a square window, three rows of pigeon holes, and through stones.	II
Maypole Cottage; 54.10316°N 2.03041°W		Mid 18th century	A house, at one time a post office, in limestone with gritstone dressings, quoins, and a stone slate roof with gable copings and shaped kneelers. There are two storeys and three bays. The doorway has quoined jambs, and the windows have flat-faced mullions and casements.	II
Two chest tombs 54.10386°N 2.03053°W		Mid 18th century	The two chest tombs are in the churchyard of St Mary's Church, Conistone and are in sandstone. Each tomb has an inscribed moulded top slab and a solid stone base.	II
Chapel House Farmhouse with outbuilding 54.09117°N 2.03041°W		1774	A farmhouse, stable and hayloft, later a private house and garage, in limestone on a plinth, with gritstone dressings, rusticated quoins, stone gutter brackets, gable copings, moulded kneelers, and a stone slate roof. There are two storeys, the house has three bays, and the outbuilding to the left is lower, with two bays. The central doorway has a triangular hood, above which is a datestone and a blind window. The other windows are tripartite with mullions and sashes. At the rear is a central doorway with a chamfered lintel, sash windows, and a round-arched stair window. The outbuilding is rendered, and has slit vents and a ball finial. In the left return is a segmental-headed cart entrance with voussoirs, a round-arched doorway, and a circular pitching hole.	II
Conistone Bridge; 54.10341°N 2.03348°W		Late 18th century	The bridge, which carries Kilnsey Road over the River Wharfe, was extended to the east in the 19th century. It is in stone, and the original part consists of three segmental arches over the river, the middle arch the largest. It has pointed cutwaters, pilasters, a deep band, and a parapet with ridged coping. To the east are revetment walls, and two flood arches with pointed cutwaters, rusticated pilasters, and incised parapet and buttress copings.	II
Skirfare Bridge; 54.11839°N 2.04490°W		Late 18th century	The bridge carries the B6160 road over the River Skirfare. It is in stone, and consists of three rounded arches, the central arch higher. The bridge has pointed cutwaters, voussoirs, a projecting band, pilasters, and a parapet with rounded coping.	II
Chapel House; 54.09517°N 2.03870°W	—	1783	A country house, later a hotel, incorporating earlier material, in limestone with quoins, stone gutter brackets, a shallow parapet, and a hipped stone slate roof. There are two storeys, a main block with fronts of three bays, and a west wing. In the centre of the main front is a doorway with a shouldered architrave, a fanlight and a triangular pediment. The windows are tripartite with mullions, and contain sashes. The left return has a recessed middle bay containing a Venetian window.	II
Telephone kiosk 54.10298°N 2.03056°W		1935	The K6 type telephone kiosk was designed by Giles Gilbert Scott. Constructed in cast iron with a square plan and a dome, it has three unperforated crowns in the top panels.	II
