= Conistone with Kilnsey =

Civil parish in North Yorkshire, England

Coordinates: 54.103°N 2.031°W

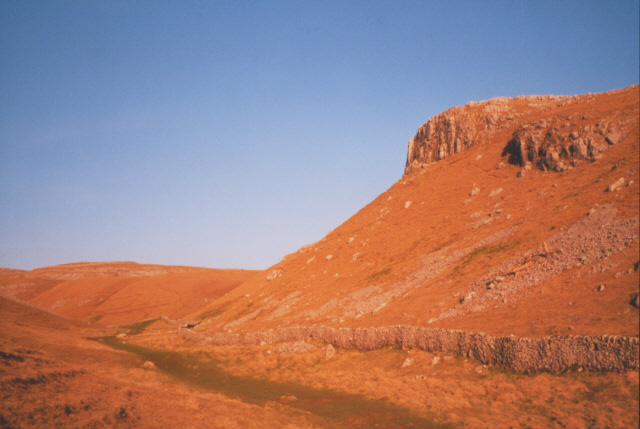
The dry gorge of Conistone Dib

Conistone with Kilnsey is a civil parish in Wharfedale in the county of North Yorkshire, England. It contains the villages of Kilnsey and Conistone. The population of this civil parish at the 2011 Census was 124 with an estimated population of 110 in 2015.

== History ==
Conistone with Kilnsey was formerly a township in the parish of Burnsall. In 1866 Conistone with Kilnsey became a civil parish in its own right. Until 1974 it was part of the West Riding of Yorkshire. From 1974 to 2023 it was part of the Craven District. It is now administered by the unitary North Yorkshire Council.

== See also ==
- Listed buildings in Conistone with Kilnsey
