= Conistone =

Village in North Yorkshire, England

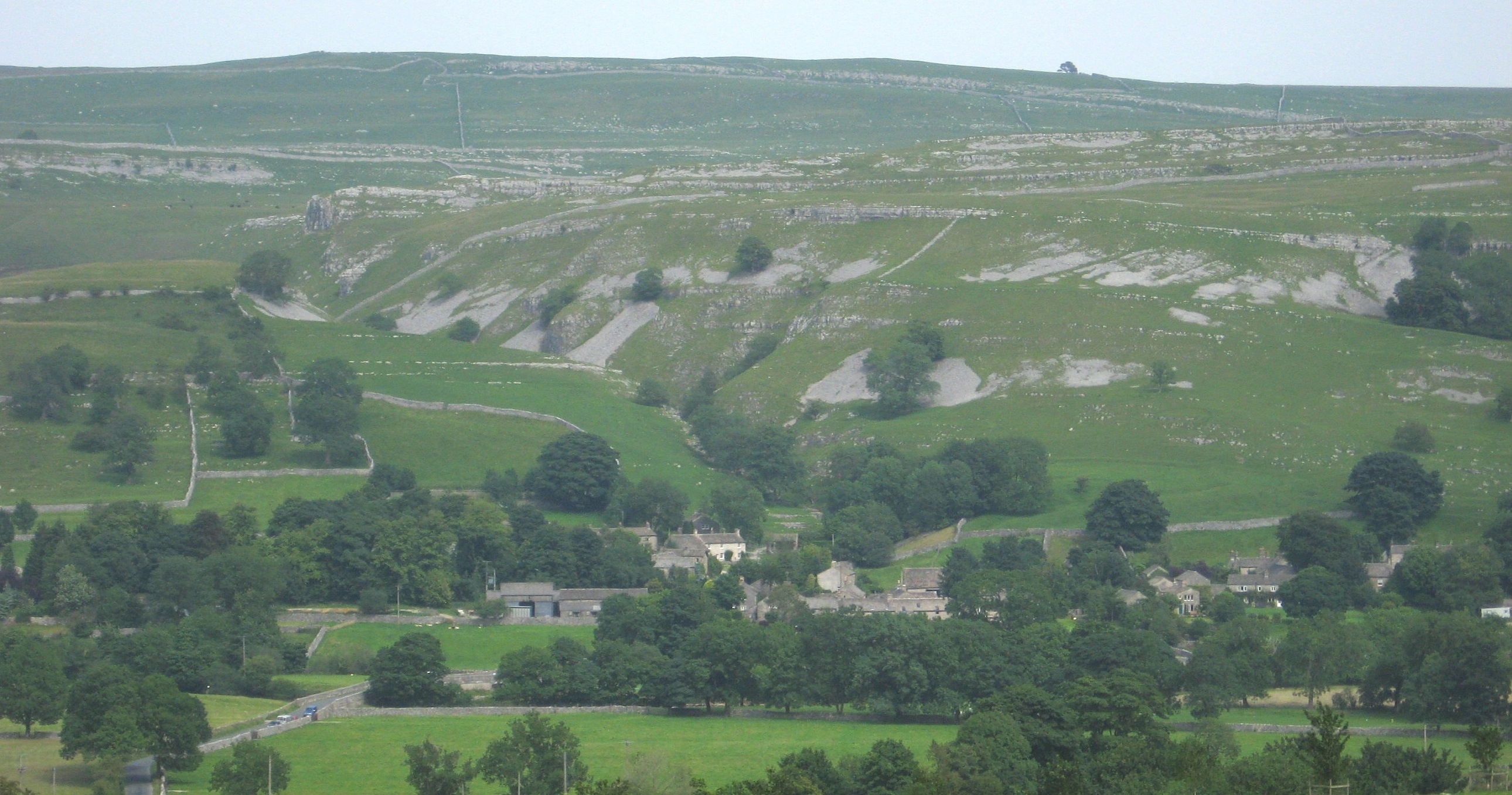
- Conistone, bridge and Dib, over Wharfedale from west

- Location within North Yorkshire
- OS grid reference: SD981675
- Civil parish: Conistone with Kilnsey
- Unitary authority: North Yorkshire
- Ceremonial county: North Yorkshire
- Region: Yorkshire and the Humber
- Country: England
- Sovereign state: United Kingdom
- Post town: SKIPTON
- Postcode district: BD23
- Dialling code: 01756
- Police: North Yorkshire
- Fire: North Yorkshire
- Ambulance: Yorkshire
- UK Parliament: Skipton and Ripon

Conistone is a small village in the county of North Yorkshire, England. It lies 3 miles (5 km) north of Grassington, 3 miles (5 km) south of Kettlewell and 12 miles (19 km) north of Skipton beside the River Wharfe, in Upper Wharfedale.

== History ==
Conistone is mentioned in the Domesday Book of 1086 as Cunestune and belonging to Ketil. The name derives from a mix of Old Danish (Kunung) and Old English (tūn), which means King's farm or settlement.

The village is set in characteristic limestone scenery, including Mossdale Caverns, the dry gorge of Conistone Dib and the limestone outcrop of Conistone Pie. Above the Dib the Dales Way path connects Kettlewell, to its north, and Grassington, to its south, providing distant views over Wharfedale. From the B6160 road, the Wharfe is crossed at Conistone by a stone-arch bridge, which is within easy walking distance of Kilnsey, with its Crag.

The parish church, St Mary's Church, dates from the 11th or 12th century, and is a Grade II listed building. The former Methodist Church in Conistone is now operated as a hostel used for conferences and retreats.

Conistone was historically in the large ancient parish of Burnsall, in Staincliffe Wapentake in the West Riding of Yorkshire. It became part of the civil parish of Conistone with Kilnsey in 1866, and was transferred to North Yorkshire in 1974. From 1974 to 2023 it was part of the Craven District. It is now administered by the unitary North Yorkshire Council.

The population of the parish in the 2001 census was 117, rising to 124 at the 2011 census. In 2015, North Yorkshire County Council had estimated the population to be 110.

Immediately to the east of the village are Conistone Moor and Riggs Moor. The moorland here was known for its lead mines, and also as being the furthest point in England from a road. Known by the Ordnance Survey as Pile of Stones, the point is on Riggs Moor and is found at 54.1427°N 1.9585°W, SE03287183.

== See also ==
- Listed buildings in Conistone with Kilnsey

== Gallery ==
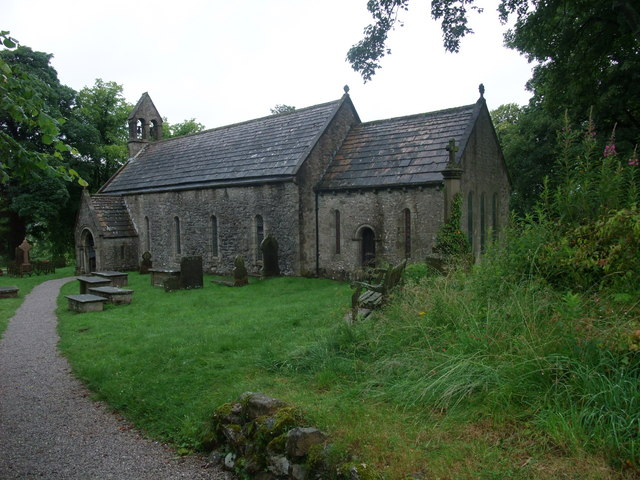
St Mary's Church, Conistone, from the south-east

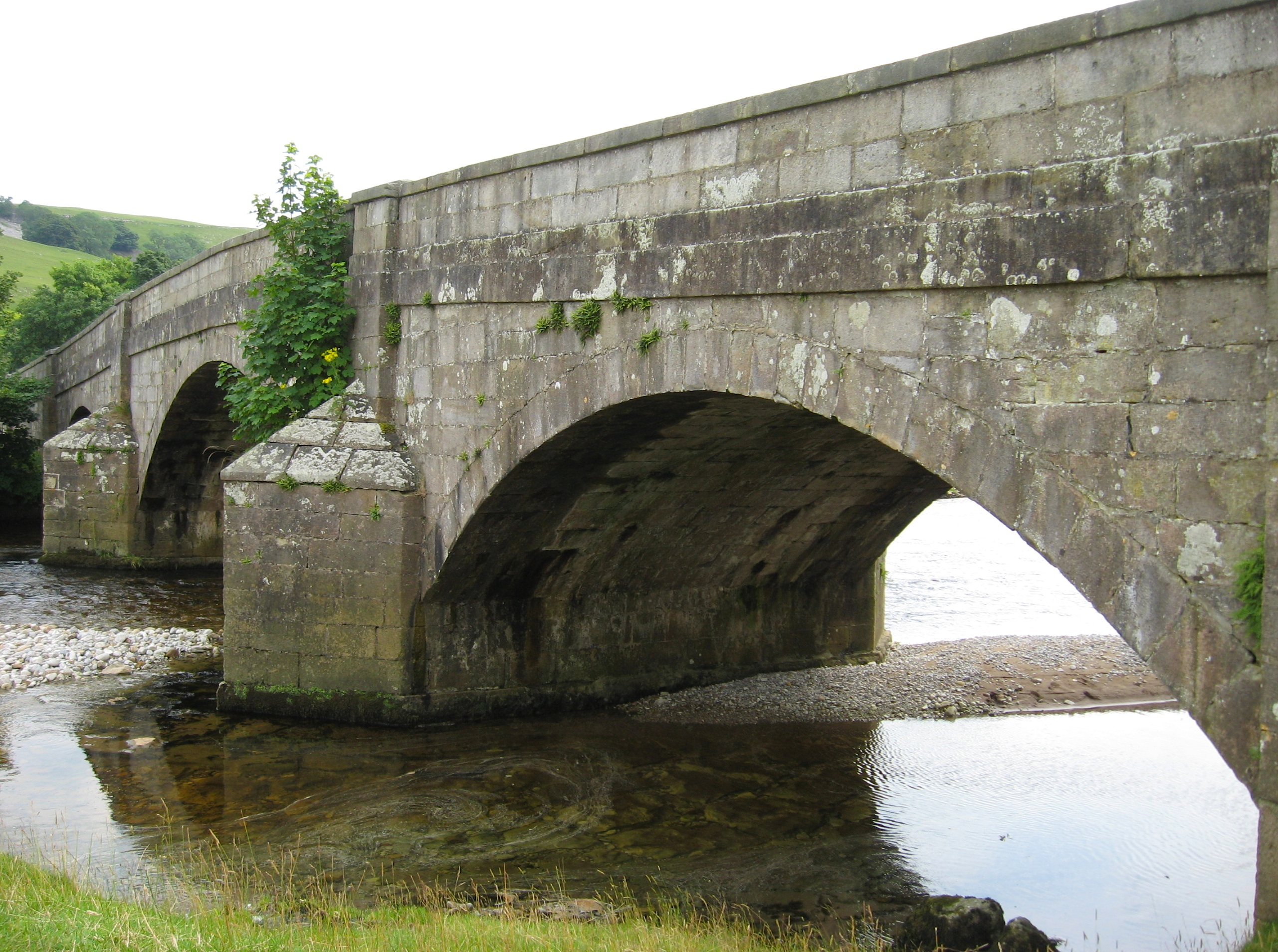
Stone arch bridge over Wharfe

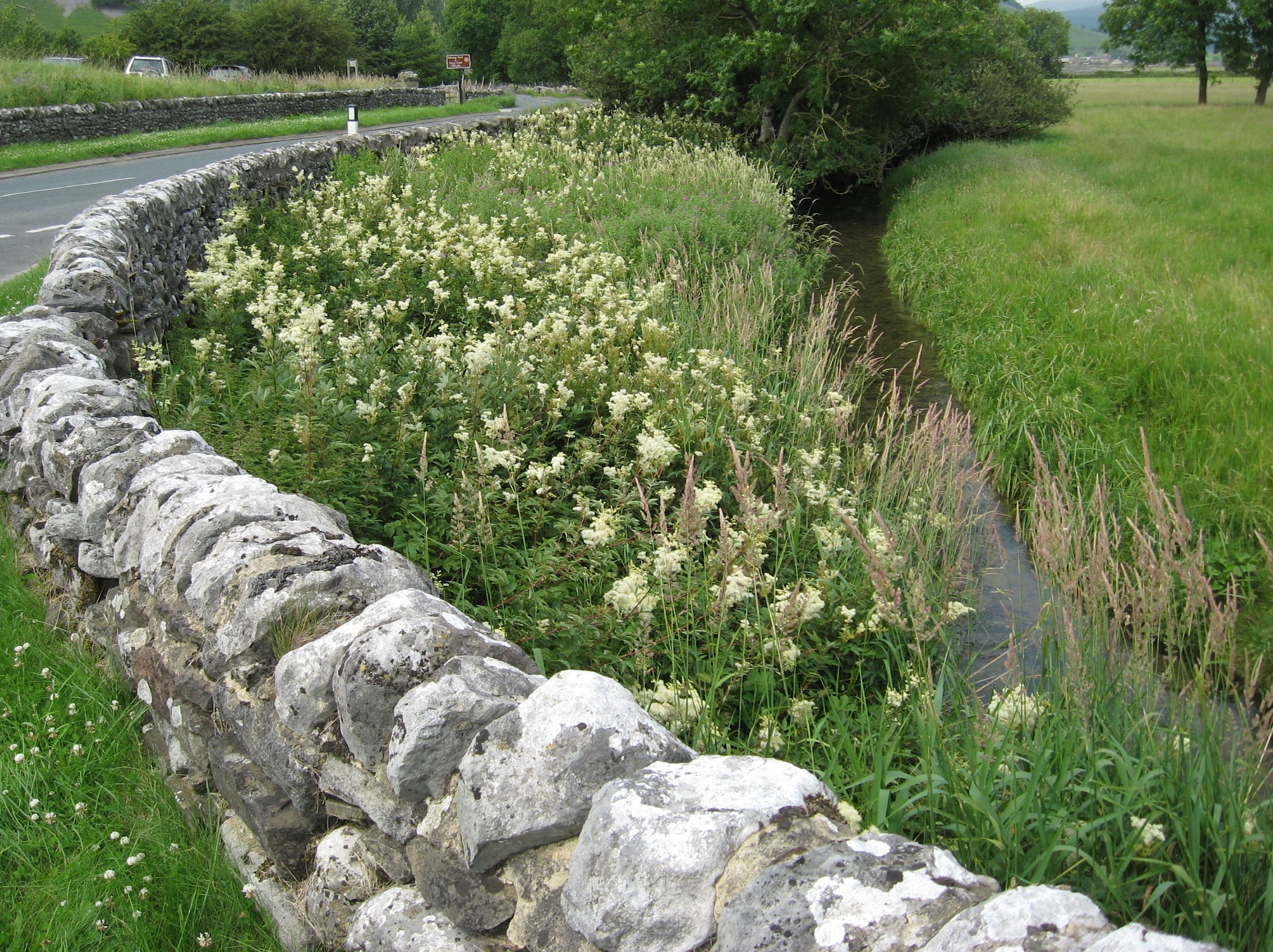
Meadowsweet along B6160, toward Kilnsey

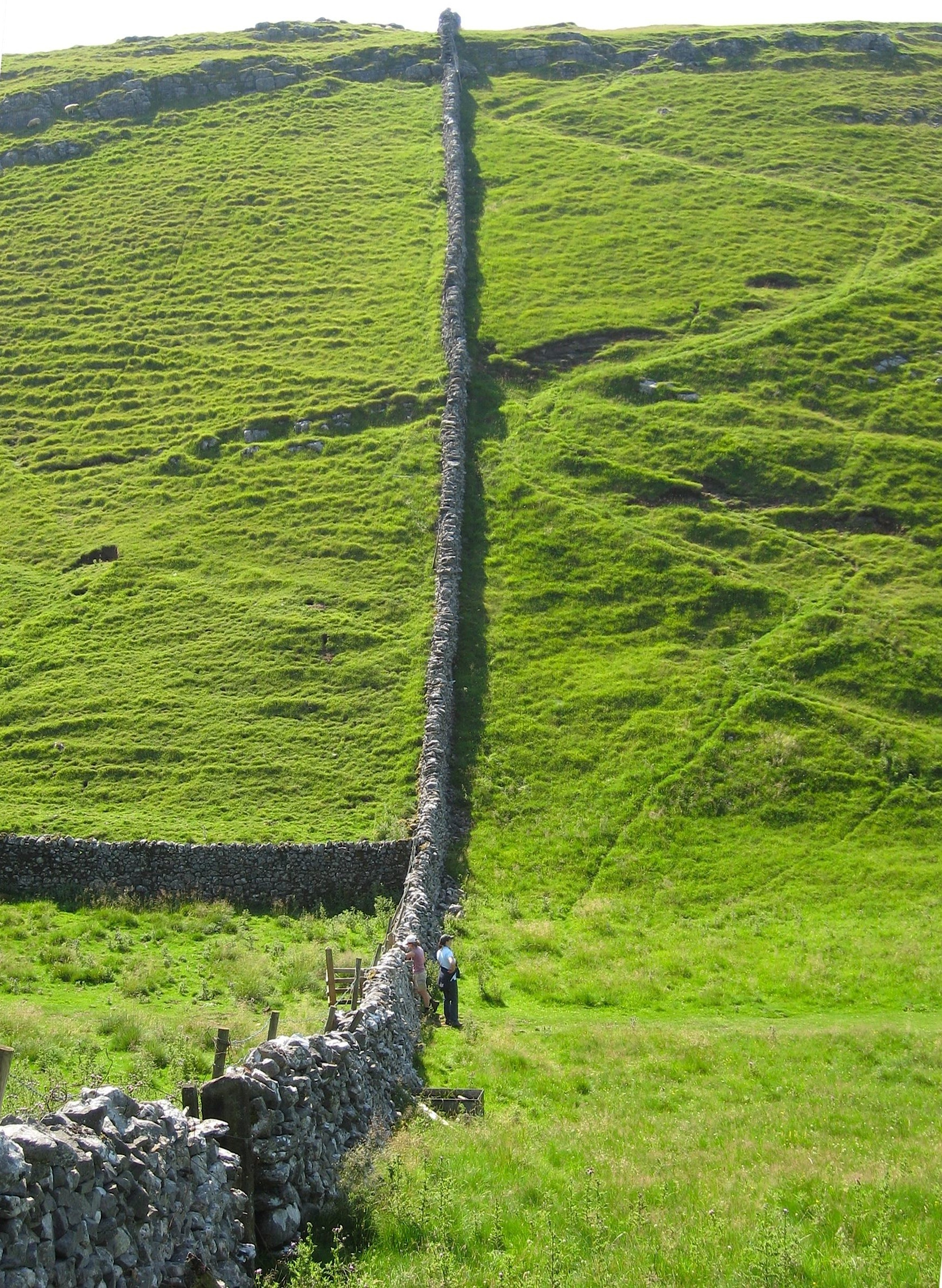
Wall across Dib

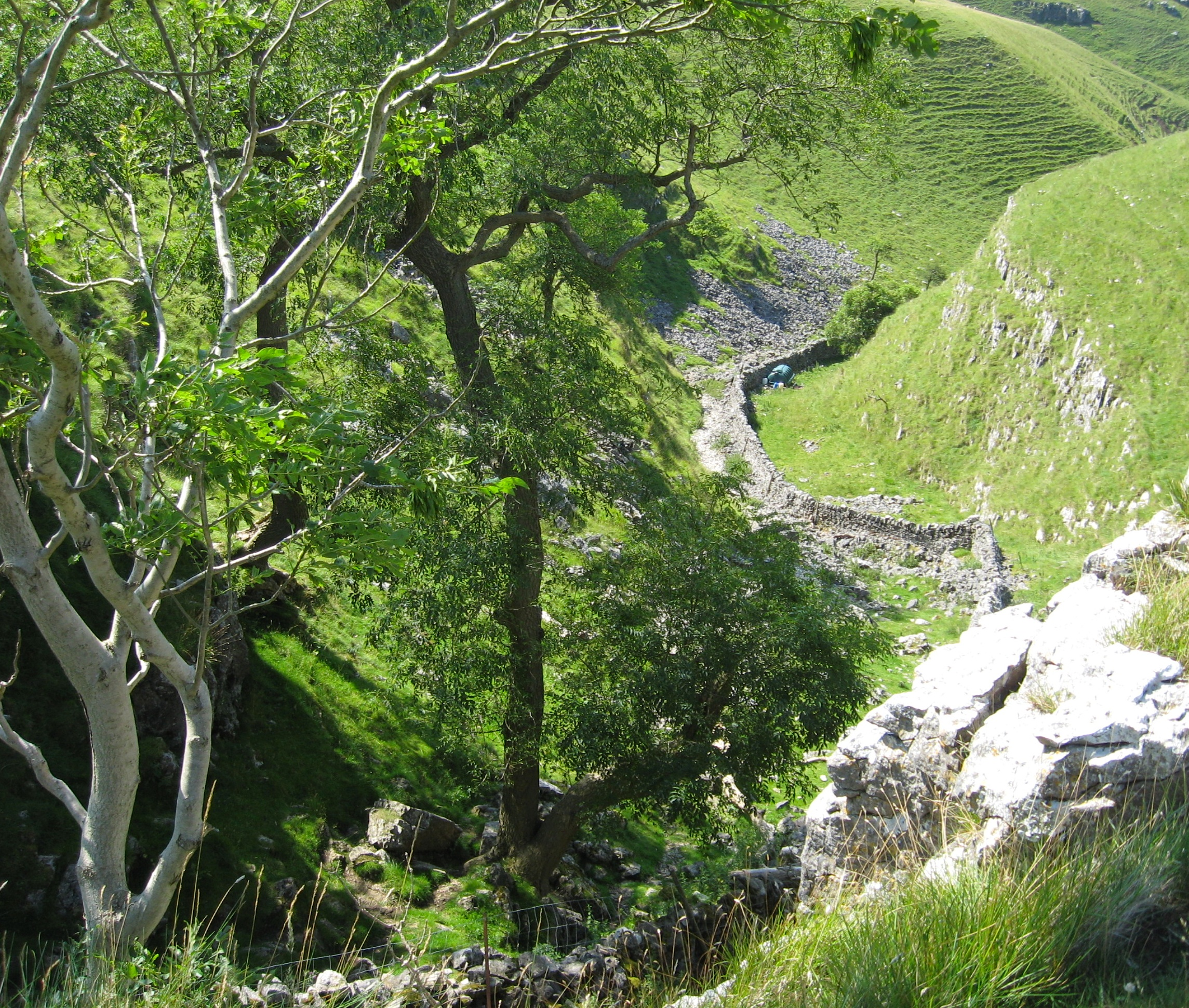
View down Dib from top, at Dales Way path

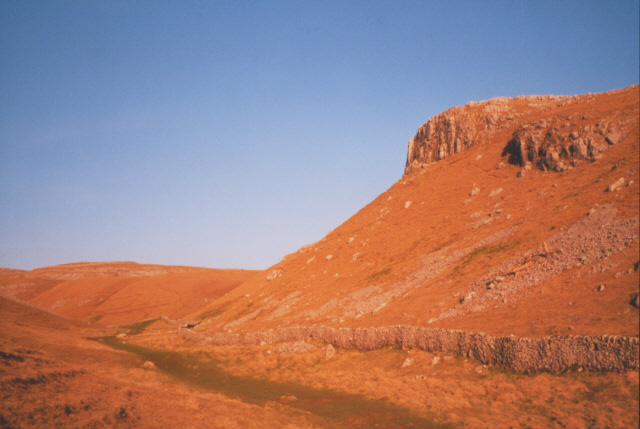
Conistone Dib
