= Mastiles Lane =

Roman road, Yorkshire, England

Mastiles Lane, near Malham and Kilnsey in North Yorkshire, was a Roman marching road and later an important route for the Cistercian monks leading sheep from Fountains Abbey to summer pasture on higher ground. Also known as the Old Monks' Road, it is now a Dales walking track.

Historic England refers to a Roman temporary camp and medieval monastic cross base located along the lane. The National Trust states that Mastiles Lane was owned by Coverham Abbey, near Middleham.

It has been suggested that after the dissolution of the monasteries Mastiles Lane became a droving route for cattle being brought south from Scotland.
