= St Mary's Church, Conistone =

Grade II listed church in North Yorkshire, England

Coordinates: 54.1039°N 2.0306°W

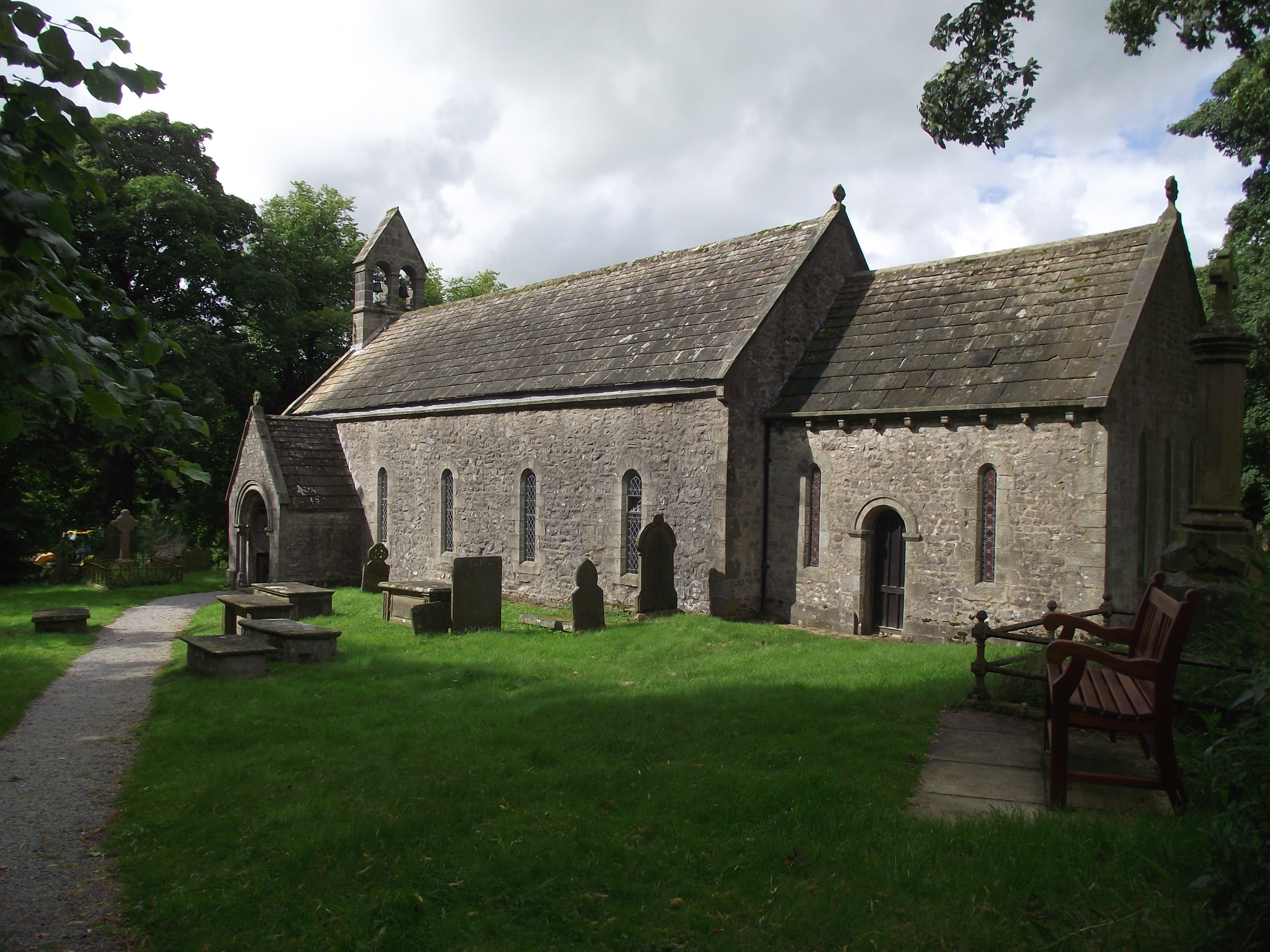
- St Mary's Church, Conistone, from the southeast

- Location in North Yorkshire
- OS grid reference: SD 980 675
- Location: Kettlewell Road, Conistone, North Yorkshire
- Country: England
- Denomination: Anglican
- Website: St Mary, Conistone

History
- Status: Parish church

Architecture
- Functional status: Active
- Heritage designation: Grade II
- Designated: 10 September 1954
- Architect: Sharpe and Paley
- Architectural type: Church
- Style: Norman, Gothic
- Groundbreaking: 11th century
- Completed: 1846

Administration
- Province: York
- Diocese: Leeds
- Archdeaconry: Craven
- Deanery: Skipton
- Parish: Kettlewell with Conistone

Clergy
- Vicar: James Theodosius

St Mary's Church is in the village of Conistone, North Yorkshire, England. It is an active Anglican parish church in the deanery of Skipton, the archdeaconry of Craven and the Diocese of Leeds. The church is recorded in the National Heritage List for England as a designated Grade II listed building.

== History ==
The church was built in the 11th or 12th century. In 1846 the chancel was added and the nave and aisle were rebuilt under the supervision of the Lancaster architects Sharpe and Paley, who maintained its original Norman style of architecture. Another period of renovation was undertaken in the 1950s, which uncovered Saxon markings on undiscovered stones in the churchyard. This led to speculation that the church could be the oldest building in the dale, and possibly in Craven.

== Architecture ==
St Mary's is constructed in limestone rubble, with gritstone dressings and a stone slate roof. Its plan consists of a five-bay nave with a north aisle and a south porch, and a three-bay chancel with a north vestry. On the west gable of the nave is a double bellcote. The east window has three lights. Internally there is an arcade between the nave and the north aisle. The two western arches of the arcade date from the early Norman period, and the two eastern arches are from the 14th century. The bowl of the font is also possibly Norman.

A memorial is located in the churchyard to the six cavers who died in the Mossdale Caverns tragedy of June 1967.

== See also ==
- Listed buildings in Conistone with Kilnsey
- List of works by Sharpe and Paley
