= Cool Scar Quarry =

Quarry in North Yorkshire, England

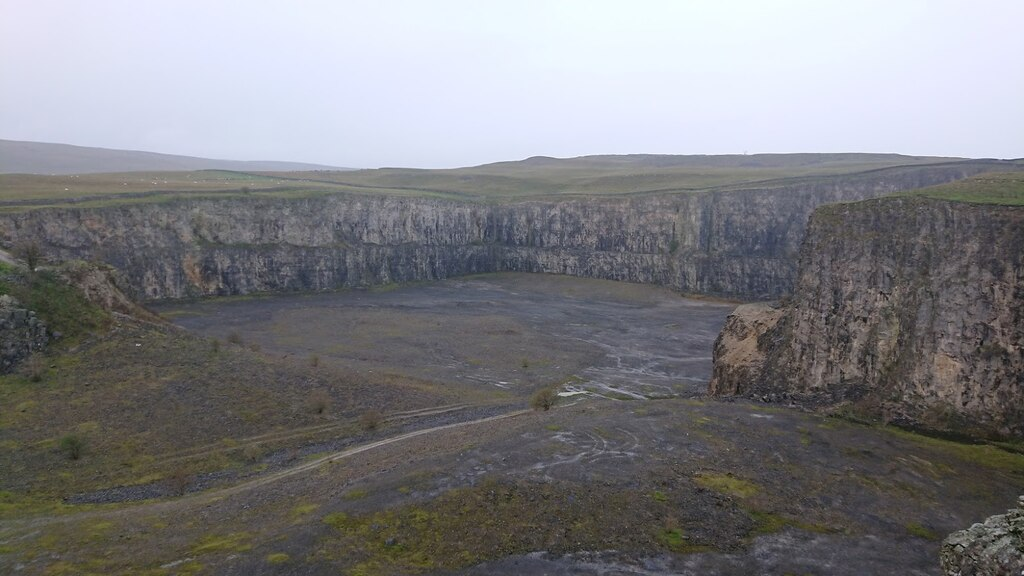
- Cool Scar Quarry
- Interactive map of Cool Scar Quarry

Location
- Location: Kilnsey, North Yorkshire, England; 54.1049°N 2.0510°W

Production
- Products: Limestone
- Type: Quarry

History
- Opened: c. 1880
- Closed: 1998

Owner
- Company: See list

Cool Scar Quarry (or Coolscar Quarry) was a quarry in Kilnsey, North Yorkshire, England. It produced agricultural and crushed limestone from c. 1880 to 1998, and in its later years was a valuable source of stone to produce magnesia. The old quarry workings are hidden from view behind (to the west of) Kilnsey Crag, which is in the Yorkshire Dales National Park.

== History ==
The quarry is situated 0.5 miles (0.80 km) to the south-west of the village of Kilnsey in Upper Wharfedale, North Yorkshire, part of the Yorkshire Dales National Park. It is hidden beyond Kilnsey Crag with a surface level at 289 metres (948 ft) above sea level, and worked limestone from the Cove Limestone Member of the Malham Formation. The name derives from the Old Norse meaning the stock enclosure/hill with cows and Sker, meaning just as it sounds, a scar or cliff. There is no authentic record of when the quarry started operating, however, it is recognised as being one of the first quarries in the Dales to be mechanised after it acquired a steam-powered jaw crusher to replace manual breaking of stones in the 1880s. From the late 1940s until the early 1960s, the quarry specialised in agricultural limes, winning approval for the plant needed to work the quarry face by arguing that if they did not quarry there, local farmers would have to travel over 80 kilometres (50 mi) to acquire lime for their fields.

At the point of the first public inquiry in 1983, the quarry covered an area of 10 acres (4 ha) and was only 100 yards (91 m) west of the cliff-face of Kilnsey Crag. The quarry plant and production buildings used to be located above the quarry, but they were moved inside the quarry in the 1960s hiding them from view. The quarry produced a high-purity limestone which was processed into magnesia, but aggregate from the quarry was also used locally. Due to the nature of the high-purity limestone and continued expansion of the quarry, the matter of the quarry's expansion was debated in the Houses of Parliament in the 1980s.

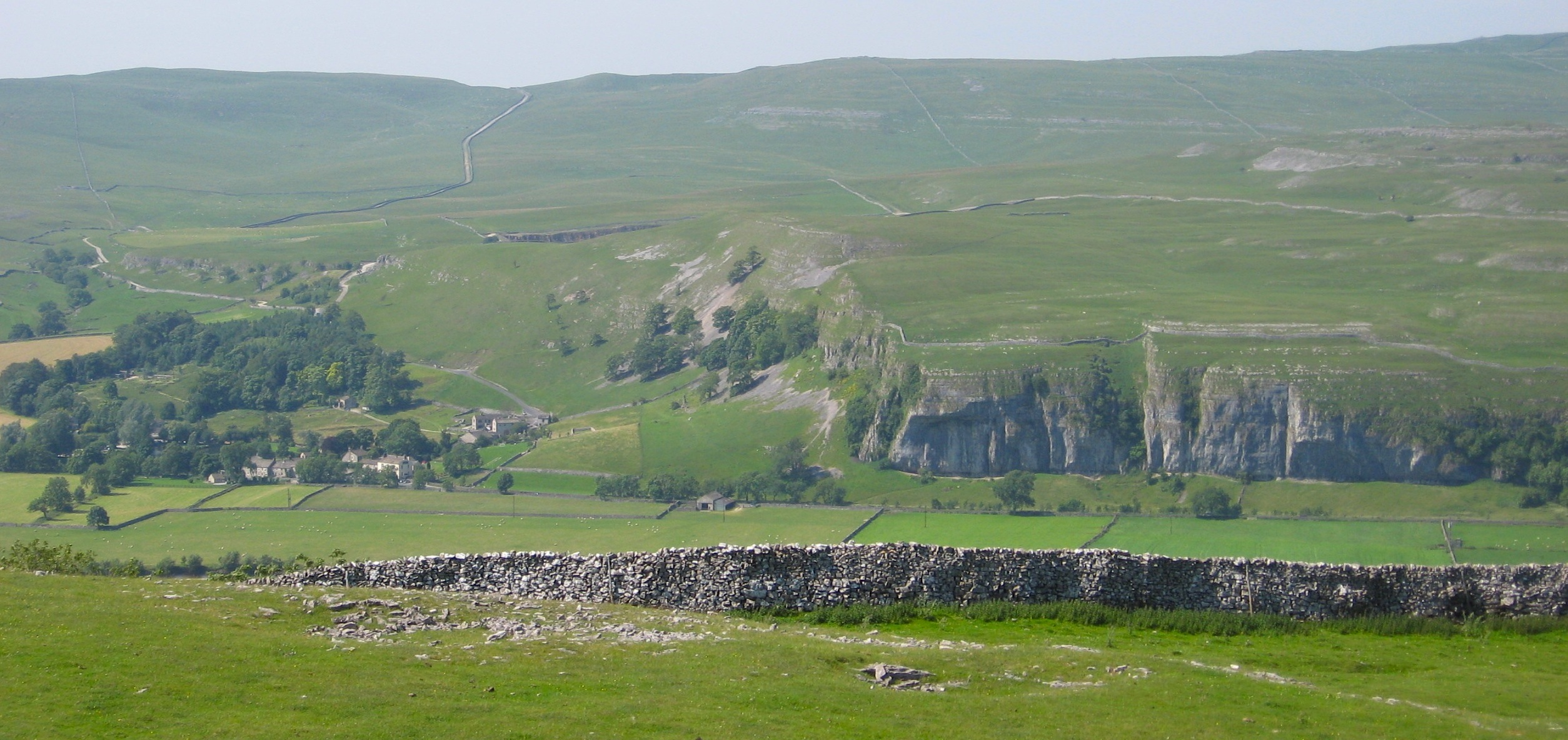
Kilnsey from Conistone. The top of the quarry can be seen on the centre left

After an initial public inquiry, the quarry owners were given permission to extend the quarry in 1983 and were limited to an output of 100,000 tonnes (110,000 tons) annually. The period of the first inquiry took so much time, that by 1985, the previous agreements on the quarries expansion and production rates had expired, and the quarry operators expanded the quarry without the proper permission. They justified this by saying that they had exhausted their permitted reserves and were "forced" to dig into the proposed new area whilst awaiting a planning decision.

In 1987, the National Park Authority granted the owners an 8-acre (3.2 ha) extension subject to "stringent" environmental considerations. Part of the reason for the quarry's survival was the need to supply limestone feedstock to a chemical plant in the north-east of England. This was limited to a ten-year period with a maximum supply of 175,000 tonnes (193,000 tons) per year. However, soon after the extension was granted, the magnesia plant changed its contract to another supplier from the Yorkshire Dales National Park, and the quarry sold its products as aggregate. The quarry was finally closed in 1998, and had latterly supported 20 jobs; ten in the quarry and ten jobs in hauling the quarried stone away.

Post closure, the quarry was partially remediated and returned to nature, however, the verticality of the walls have been described as "not being conducive to plant colonisation." The quarry site is almost entirely surrounded by the Malham-Arncliffe SSSI.

== Owners ==
- ?–1946 W. D. Roberts
- 1947–1977 Better Limes (trading as Kilnsey Limes)
- 1977–1987 Eskett Quarries
- 1987–1998 Aggregate Industries
