= Kilnsey Old Hall =

Historic building in Kilnsey, North Yorkshire, England

Coordinates: 54°06′23″N 2°02′32″W

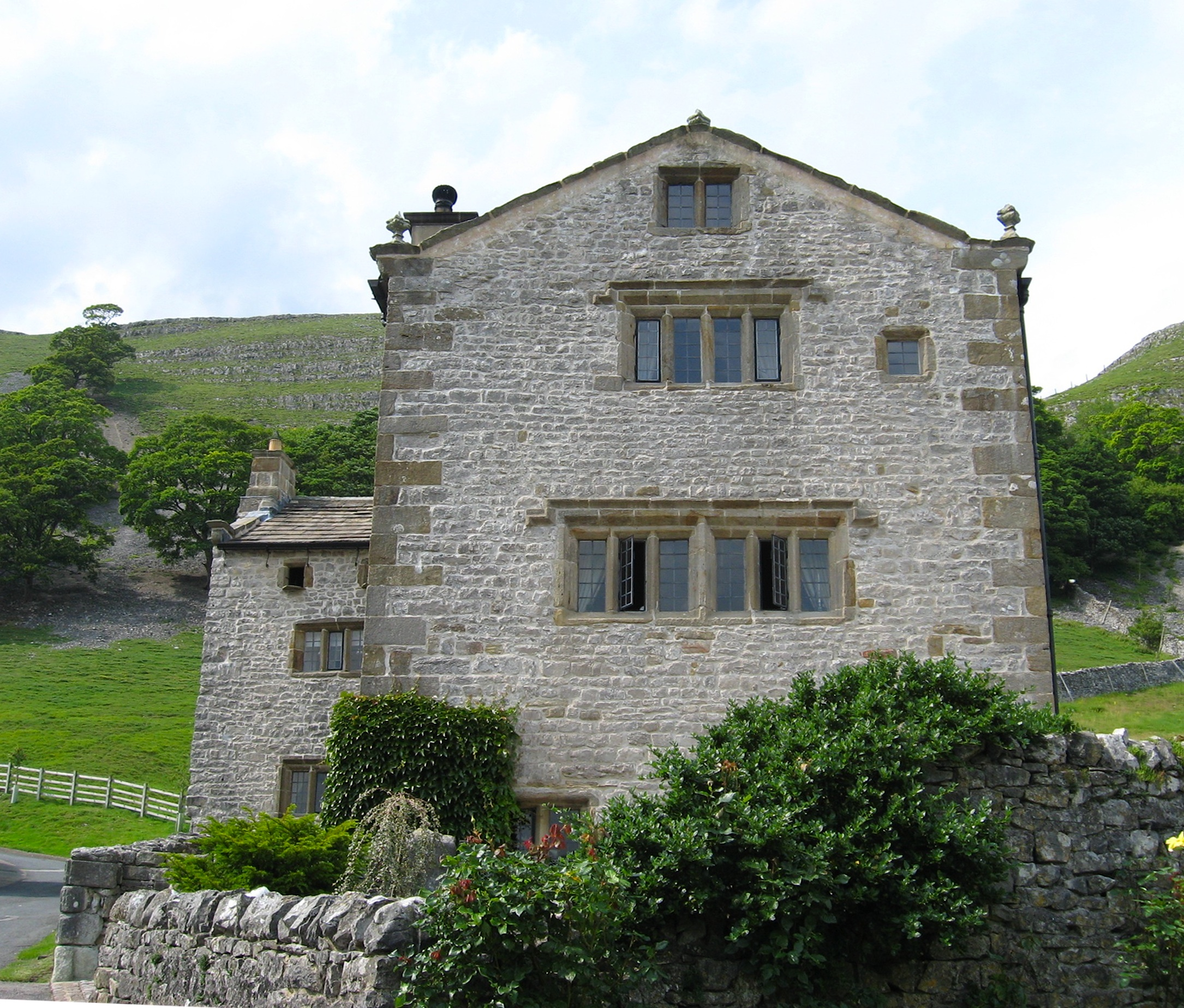
The building, in 2008

Kilnsey Old Hall is a historic building in Kilnsey, a village in North Yorkshire, in England.

In the Mediaeval period, the site was owned by Fountains Abbey, who operated a grange there. Following the Dissolution of the Monasteries, it was sold to the Yorke family, who in the 17th century sold it to Christopher Wade. In 1648, he constructed a new house on the site, now the Old Hall. The Wade family sold the house in 1693, and by 1745 it had been let to a tenant. In about 1800, it was converted into a farm outbuilding, and in 1805 it was described as "fast becoming a ruin". However, it was reroofed, and survived, with cattle stalls added to the ground floor in the 20th century. In 1998, it was purchased and restored, partly funded through operational costs as a bed and breakfast.

The building is built of limestone on a chamfered plinth, with gritstone dressings, quoins, and a stone slate roof, hipped on the right and with moulded gable coping and kneelers with vase finials elsewhere. There is an L-shaped plan, the main range with four bays, three storeys and an attic, reducing on a slope to two storeys and an attic, and a rear wing with three storeys and one bay. In the northeast front is a doorway with chamfered quoined jambs, a cart entrance with a segmental arch and a keystone, a doorway with moulded quoined jambs and an arched lintel with initials and the date, and a flight of external steps leading to a doorway with a chamfered quoined surround. Most of the windows are recessed, chamfered and mullioned. Inside, the first and second floors retain 17th century plasterwork and fireplaces, and there is a queen post roof. The building has been Grade II* listed since 1954.

== See also ==
- Grade II* listed buildings in North Yorkshire (district)
- Listed buildings in Conistone with Kilnsey
