= Mossdale Caverns =

Cave system in the Yorkshire Dales, England

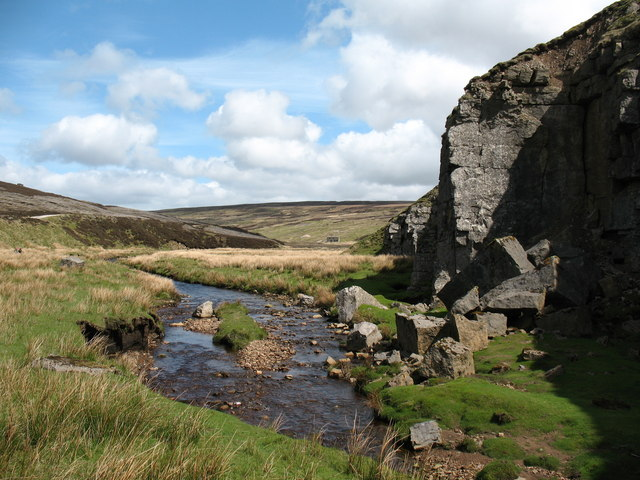
- Mossdale Scar
- Interactive map of Mossdale Caverns
- Location: Yorkshire Dales
- Coordinates: 54°07′25″N 1°58′36″W
- Depth: 76 m (249 ft)
- Length: 10.5 km (6.5 mi)
- Discovery: 1941
- Geology: Carboniferous limestone
- Entrances: 1
- Difficulty: Grade 5
- Hazards: Flooding
- Access: not granted
- Cave survey: Online ULSA survey

Mossdale Caverns is a cave system in the Yorkshire Dales, England. It is about 5 kilometres (3.1 mi) north of Grassington, and east of Conistone, where Mossdale Beck sinks at the base of Mossdale Scar. It lies at an altitude of 425 metres (1,394 ft) on the eastern flank of Wharfedale, and extends south-east beneath Grassington Moor.

The cave system is formed within the Middle Limestone of the Yoredale Series. The large stream (average flow 100 litres/second) has been shown by dye testing to resurge at Black Keld, some 4.4 kilometres (2.7 mi) to the WNW 225 metres (738 ft) lower. This cave system is within the Site of Special Scientific Interest called Black Keld Catchment SSSI.

== Speleology ==
Eli Simpson, a founder of the British Speleological Association, had become convinced there was a large undiscovered cave system in the area and devoted much of his time to finding it. Simpson later enlisted the help of fellow B.S.A. member Bob Leakey, who recruited a team of female co-workers from Yeadon aircraft factory to help the exploration of Mossdale Scar. (The Second World War had created a local shortage of able-bodied males.) On 31 May 1941, while searching for a fallen tobacco pipe, Leakey found an entrance which led to the subsequent exploration of Mossdale Caverns.

It is a very challenging cave system prone to flooding, with many passages involving long wet crawls while other sections can be neck-deep in water; many of Leakey's explorations were conducted solo as few contemporaries had the necessary endurance. The end was finally reached again in 1964 by Mike Boon and Pete Livesey. A return trip to the far end takes between eight and ten hours.

Legal permission to enter the caves is no longer granted because of the tragedy that occurred in 1967, but exploration does still take place on an unofficial basis. It is thought that the cave system (known as the 'missing link') may hold the key to breaking into the Great Scar Limestone and the extensive cave that exists behind Black Keld.

== 1967 tragedy ==
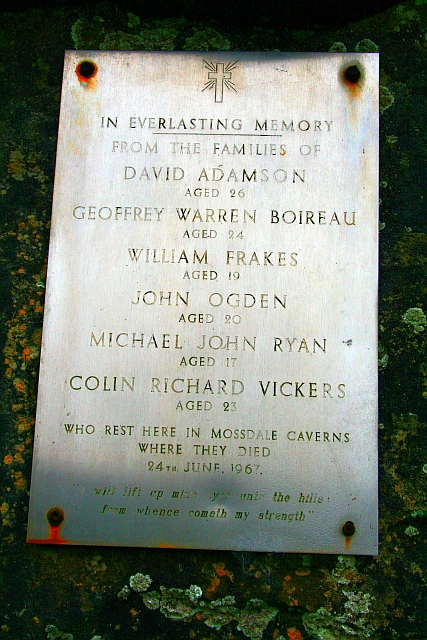
Memorial plaque above the entrance

The cave system is notorious amongst cavers in the United Kingdom for a tragedy that occurred on 24 June 1967. On that day, ten cavers entered the system. Three hours later, four members of the party decided not to continue and exited the cave system. One of the four – Morag Forbes – returned to the entrance shortly afterwards, only to find it completely submerged, recent rainfall having swollen Mossdale Beck. Realising immediately that the six cavers who remained inside the cave system were in danger, she ran 4 kilometres (2.5 mi) across the moor to raise the alarm.

Cave rescue teams arrived at the scene, but the high water levels prevented access to the cave. The waters of Mossdale Beck had to be diverted away from the cave entrance by digging a trench. Even then the rescue operation could not be started because of the high water levels inside.

It was not until the following day that entry was possible. The cave rescue teams found the bodies of five of the cavers in the Far Marathon Crawls, and Bob Leakey led a search party to a location where he believed the sixth might have survived, without success. The sixth body was located the following day. The bodies were left in situ. The coroner decided the cave should be sealed, and concrete was poured down the only safe entrance. This was later re-opened and in 1971, with the agreement of their families, the bodies were buried by their colleagues from the ULSA in "Mud Caverns", a chamber at the far end of the system.

This is to date the most deadly incident in British caving. A memorial plaque is affixed to the cliff above the entrance.

On the moors above is a memorial cairn. The plaque on the cairn reads: "Mossdale memorial cairn – over the place in the cave where the bodies were found".
