= Cowside =

Valley in North Yorkshire, England

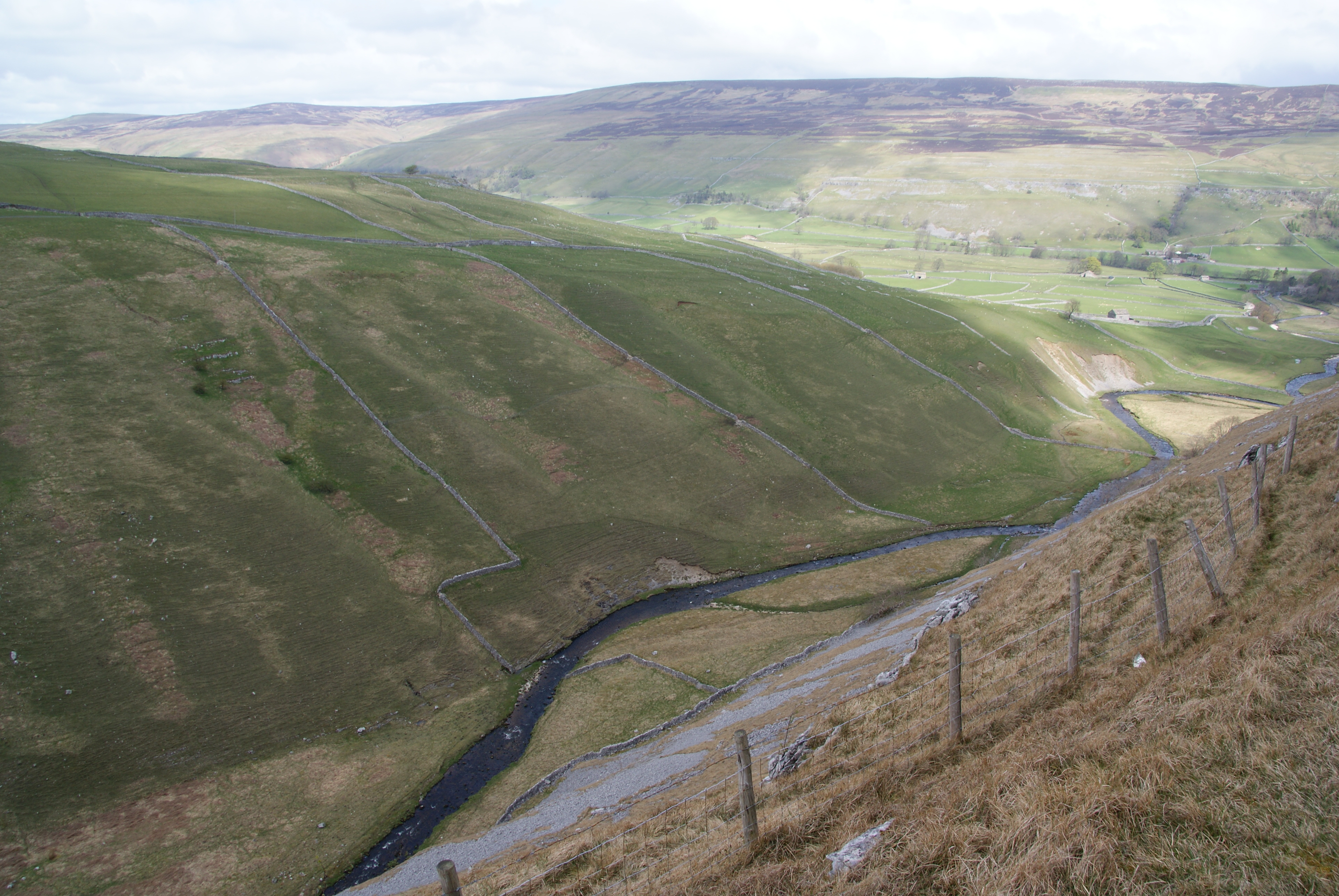
- Cowside Beck from Monk's Road

- Location within North Yorkshire
- Floor elevation: 950–890 feet (290–270 m) (south west to north east)
- Length: 8 miles (13 km) South east–north west

Geology
- Type: Valley

Geography
- Location: Arncliffe
- Country: England
- State/Province: North Yorkshire
- Coordinates: 54.126°N 2.143°W
- River: Cowside Beck
- Interactive map of Cowside

Cowside is a side dale of Littondale in North Yorkshire, England. The valley, which faces in a north east direction, carries the waters of Cowside Beck to the River Skirfare at Arncliffe, draining an area of 8.9 square miles (23 km^{2}), and flowing for 7.5 miles (12 km). Cowside is one of the few 'V'-shaped valleys in the Yorkshire Dales (as opposed to a 'U'-shaped valley) which had ice run across the valley, but not down it. The only settlement in the valley is Darnbrook, a very small hamlet at the foot of Darnbrook Fell. Cowside is a common name in the Craven area of the Yorkshire Dales, and it is not to be confused with the Cowside in Upper Wharfedale near Buckden, nor the Cowside Beck near Stainforth.

Most of the valley is in the civil parish of Arncliffe, but the upper part of the valley, including the hamlet of Darnbrook, is in the civil parish of Malham Moor. Part of Cowside valley is within the protected area: Malham-Arncliffe SSSI.

== Description ==
The Cowside valley was carved out by glacial action, but the ice flow ran across the valley southwards (transverse) rather than down the valley. This action created the deep incised V-shape. The Devensian ice moved from the north-west to the south-east across Cowside Valley, but some ice may have been pushed up the valley (north-eastwards) towards Arncliffe. Evidence of human habitation in the area is evident from the Bronze Age. The remains of small pounds to keep cattle in can be found in the valley above Cowside Beck. One such settlement is at Dew Bottoms (SD912692), which shows distinct outlines in the ground of huts, both circular and rectangular, and crude boulder walls for pens. In the latter half of the 12th century, William de Percy [II] granted the rights of the pasture land between Malham Tarn and Arncliffe to the monks of Fountains Abbey.

At the eastern end of the beck, where it spills into Littondale, the north-west facing stones are home to dryas octopetala, a now rare plant that exists at is southernmost in England at Cowside. The underlying stone of the valley floor is Cove Limestone (Holkerian), but at the valley sides and tops, it consists of Gordale Limestone, with the surrounding hills of Darnbrook Fell and Fountains Fell belonging to the Yoredale Series, though the uppermost part of Fountains Fell is Millstone Grit. It is thought that much of the water from the high ground on the south side of the valley disappears in the limestone to enter the Wharfe catchment further downstream, or even under Gordale Scar into the Aire catchment. Rainfall over the catchment is an average of 59 inches (1,500 mm) annually, and the mean annual temperature is 7.7 °C (45.9 °F).

Cowside beck is known to be home to trout, bullheads, wandering snail (lymnaea peregra), the river limpet (ancylus fluviatilis) and gammarus pulex. The valley and Cowside Beck are within the Malham-Arncliffe SSSI, a 12,191-acre (4,934 ha) upland protected area. The becks of Malham Tarn outflow, Gordale and Cowside Beck, are noted as being of "high water quality which provide a range of aquatic conditions and associated flora and fauna."

In normal flow, Cowside Beck discharges water into the River Skirfare at a rate of 0.25 metres per second (0.82 ft/s). The beck has an average width of 11 feet (3.4 m), and an average depth of 6 inches (15.3 cm). Cowside is surrounded by the hills of Parson's Pulpit (1,765 feet (538 m)) to the south, Knowle Fell (1,946 feet (593 m)) and Fountains Fell (2,192 feet (668 m)) to the west, and Darnbrook Fell (2,047 feet (624 m)) to the north. All of these feed water into Cowside Beck through Darnbrook Beck, Fountains Fell Tarn, and Thoragill Beck among others. Cowside Beck flows for 7.5 miles (12 km) and drains an area of 8.9 square miles (23 km^{2}). At the northern end of the dale, the beck meanders before it flows into Arncliffe and the River Skirfare.

One of the caves in the valley, Robinson's Pot, has a strange access point being located in a grate underneath the kitchen window of Darnbrook Farm. The farmhouse and farm are a National Trust tenancy which is about 3 miles (4.8 km) south west of Arncliffe. It was first discovered in the 19th century, and re-surveyed in 1975. In 2002, the original species list found in the cave system had dwindled, something which the surveyors put down to the strong smell of sheep dip in the cave system, believing that sheep dip had leached into the water systems underground. Other caves include Yew Cogar (on the south side), Darnbrook Pot, Loop Cave, and Thoragill Cave. The valley floor near Falcon Cave is about 890 feet (270 m) above sea level, but the top of the valley at Dew Bottoms, is 1,426 feet (434.7 m).

Darnbrook itself, is a three-building hamlet where the watercourse coming off Darnbrook Fell (and from Fountains Fell Tarn) meets Cowside Beck. Eastwards from here is the Cowside Gorge, a 2,000 feet (600 m) long limestone gorge with steep walls on either side. On the south side of the gorge is Yew Cogar Scar, where the limestone is in layers interspersed with other stones, providing a horizontal strata look to the edges. Darnbrook is mentioned in William Wordsworth's poem, The White Doe of Rylstone as Dernbrook. Cowside has also been a filming location for the 21st century version of All Creatures Great and Small.

A single road crosses the valley on the northern side, leaving Arncliffe south-westwards and taking the watershed between the Wharfe and Aire catchments to the head of Malham Tarn. A track is located on the south ridge of the valley, and this is known as the Monk's Road. It was supposedly a path that the monks took to travel between their estates in the area.

There is a Cowside Beck near to Stainforth in the Ribblesdale valley; this beck feeds water over Catrigg Force, and into the River Ribble. Another Cowside, also in the parish of Arncliffe, relates to an 18th-century farmhouse in Langstrothdale near Beckermonds. The name Cowside is first recorded in 1571 as Cowesyde, and literally means cow hill side.
