= List of lakes and tarns in North Yorkshire =

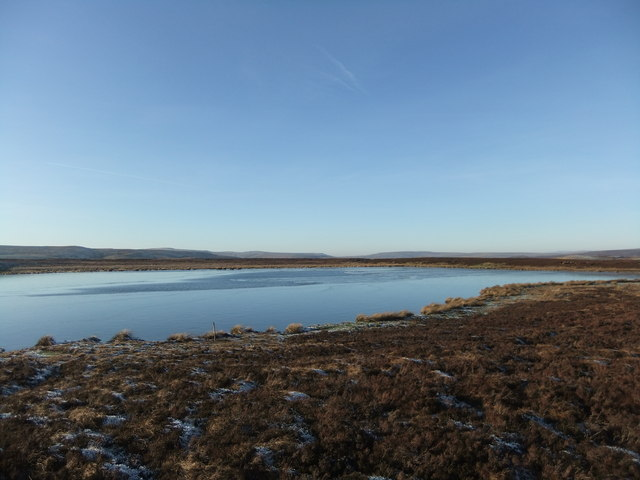
Summer Lodge Tarn

This is a list of lakes and tarns in North Yorkshire, England. Unlike the nearby Lake District, North Yorkshire does not have many natural lakes due to the porosity of the limestone underneath the surface. The JNCC Special Area of Conservation status for the Craven Limestone Complex lists running and standing Water at only 1%. Upland tarns are common where the underlying stone allows the water to collect. These tarns are usually surrounded by peat, so most have relatively acidic water in comparison to the alkaline nature of water which runs over Limestone common in the area.

Man-made reservoirs and dams, such as at Moss Dam in Swaledale, are not included, as the list focuses only on natural lakes and tarns. The list only covers those within Yorkshire, and sites such as Sunbiggin Tarn, whilst in the Yorkshire Dales National Park, are not included, as that body of water is in the county of Cumbria. Some tarns or lakes may no longer exist; historical documents refer to Giggleswick, Wigglesworth and Swinsty as having tarns - however, these have either dried up or have been drained.

== List ==
List of lakes and tarns in North Yorkshire
Name	Location	Coordinates	Height AMSL	Volume	Notes	Ref
Birkdale Tarn	Keld	54.411°N 2.229°W	1,598 feet (487 m)	11,900,000 cubic feet (336,000 m^{3})		
Birks Tarn	Birks Fell	54.179°N 2.120°W	1,959 feet (597 m)	2,960,400 cubic feet (83,828 m^{3})	In the 1890s, Birks Tarn was described as being "two sheets of water", but would become one big body of water in heavy rains.	
Blow Tarn	Greenhow	54.053°N 1.853°W	1,270 feet (387 m)			
Cotter End Tarn	Cotterdale	54.338°N 2.280°W	1,696 feet (517 m)			
Coverdale Tarn	Coverdale	54.211°N 1.891°W	1,710 feet (520 m)			
Cray Tarn	Oughtershaw	54.226°N 2.121°W	1,962 feet (598 m)			
Eshton Tarn	Bell Busk	54.0145°N 2.127°W	472 feet (144 m)	1,519,100 cubic feet (43,015 m^{3})		
Fleet Moss Tarn	Fleet Moss	54.247°N 2.194°W	1,896 feet (578 m)			
Fountains Fell Tarn	Fountains Fell	54.137°N 2.202°W	2,116 feet (645 m)	3,000,000 cubic feet (86,000 m^{3})		
Gallaber Pond (Flash)	Hellifield	54.011°N 2.238°W	490 feet (150 m)		The flash lake is sandwiched between the A65 road and the railway line north of Hellifield railway station. It does not appear on mapping from the early 1900s and is listed as a flash lake.	
Gormire Lake	Sutton Bank	54.242°N 1.229°W	509 feet (155 m)	5,500,000 cubic feet (155,000 m^{3})	Gormire has no major inflow, or outflow of water, and is thought to be fed by natural springs.	
Greensett Moss	Ribblehead	54.234°N 2.395°W	584 metres (1,916 ft)	48,836 cubic metres (1,724,600 cu ft)		
Grey Heugh Slack	Fylingdales Moor	54.409°N 0.601°E	195 metres (640 ft)		Pool is 65 centimetres (26 in) deep and covers an area of 1.3 hectares (3.2 acres). Does not have any inflows of water, and drains to the south-west.	
Hunters Hole	Oughtershaw	54.227°N 2.132°W	2,057 feet (627 m)			
Locker Tarn	Carperby	54.320°N 1.997°W	1,086 feet (331 m)	2,509,900 cubic feet (71,073 m^{3})		
Malham Tarn	Malhamdale	54.097°N 2.163°W	1,230 feet (375 m)	55,066,300 cubic feet (1,559,303 m^{3})		
Middle Tongue Tarn	Oughtershaw	54.233°N 2.142°W	2,047 feet (624 m)		The name derives from the fact that its straddles "the tongue [of land] of two valleys"	
Newhouses Tarn	Horton-in-Ribblesdale	54.169°N 2.308°W	814 feet (248 m)	2,340,000 cubic feet (66,261 m^{3})	Adjacent to the River Ribble. Listed on the lakes portal as "Unnamed Water Body ID 29701" and on OS Mapping as The Tarn. One book source from 1921 describes a tarn "1.5 miles (2.4 km)" north of Horton-in-Ribblesdale as "Newhouses Tarn", named after the nearest hamlet.	
Oughtershaw Tarn	Oughtershaw	54.234°N 2.181°W	1,824 feet (556 m)			
Priest's Tarn	Grassington	54.121°N 1.959°W	1,691 feet (515.5 m)			
Scarborough Mere	Scarborough	54.261°N 0.412°W	141 feet (43 m)	9,895,300 cubic feet (280,205 m^{3})		
Semerwater	Countersett	54.280°N 2.124°W	807 feet (246 m)	35,327,800 cubic feet (1,000,372 m^{3})		
Slatepit Moss	Ravenseat Moor	54.438°N 2.221°W	1,877 feet (572 m)			
South Grain Tarn	Oughtershaw	54.231°N 2.113°W	1,926 feet (587 m)			
Summer Lodge Tarn	Crackpot	54.350°N 2.078°W	1,722 feet (525 m)	4,229,000 cubic feet (119,760 m^{3})		
Whitaside Tarn	Crackpot	54.351°N 2.036°W	1,732 feet (528 m)			
Widdale Little Tarn (Note: The county boundary between North Yorkshire and Cumbria runs through the middle of this tarn. Great Widdale Tarn, which is adjacent, is completely within Cumbria. Before the boundary changes of 1974, both tarns were in the West Riding of Yorkshire.)	Widdale Fell	54.288°N 2.318°W	2,090 feet (637 m)			
Woogill Tarn	Nidderdale	54.210°N 1.896°W	1,710 feet (520 m)			
