= Fountains Fell Tarn =

Upland lake in the Yorkshire Dales, England

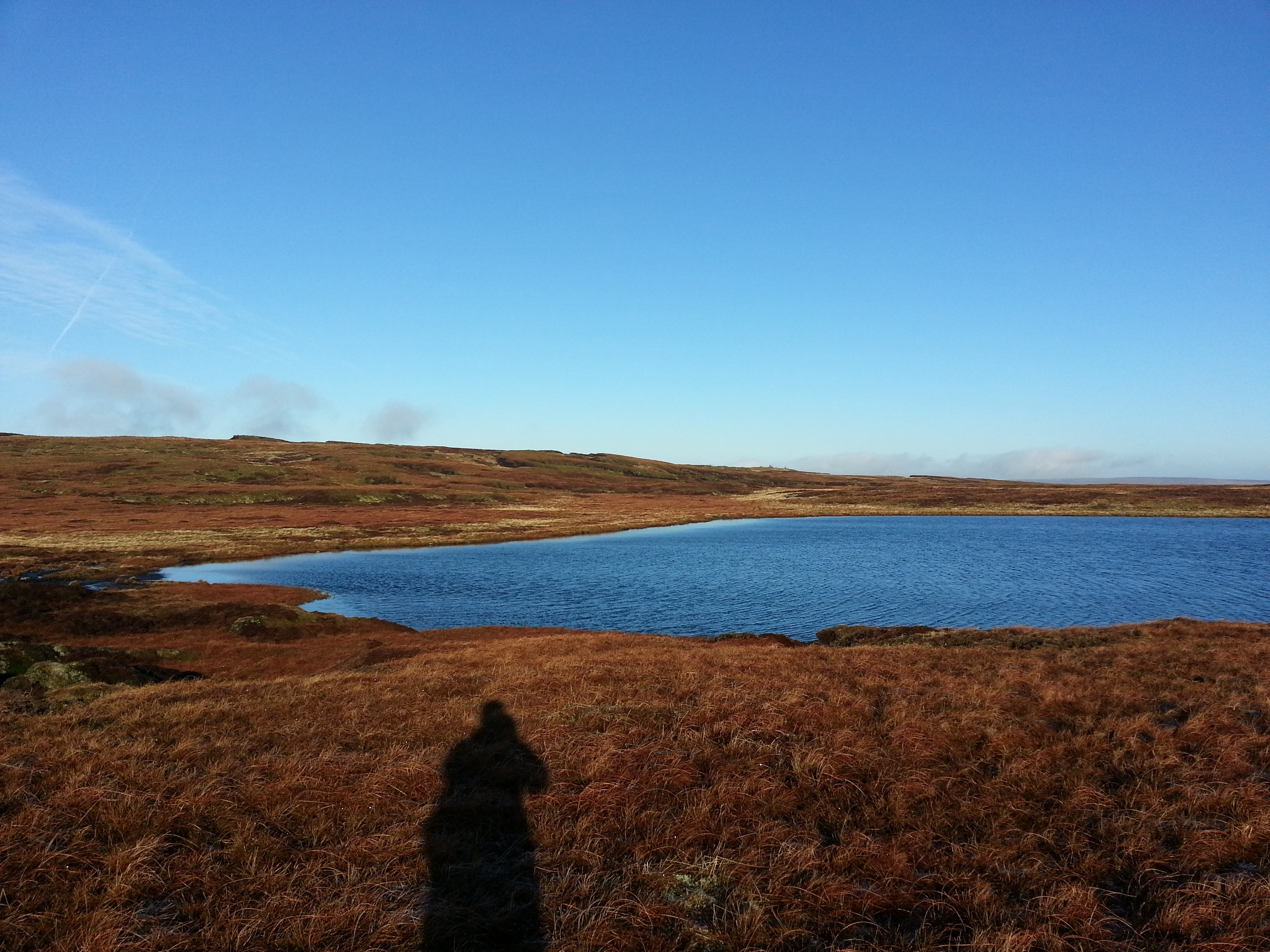
- Fountains Fell Tarn

- Location within North Yorkshire
- Location: Fountains Fell, North Yorkshire,
- Coordinates: 54.137°N 2.202°W
- Type: Tarn
- Etymology: Derived from Fountains Fell
- Primary inflows: None
- Primary outflows: Darnbrook Beck; Cowside Beck
- Catchment area: 37 acres (15 ha)
- Basin countries: England
- Surface area: 4.9 acres (2 ha)
- Average depth: 1 foot 8 inches (0.5 m)
- Water volume: 3,000,000 cubic feet (86,000 m^{3})
- Shore length^{1}: 0.62 miles (1 km)
- Surface elevation: 2,116 feet (645 m)
- ^{1} Shore length is not a well-defined measure.

Fountains Fell Tarn, is an upland lake between the two peaks of Fountains Fell, in North Yorkshire, England. The tarn is close to the Pennine Way, some 4.3 miles (7 km) north west of Malham Tarn, and 4.3 miles (7 km) east of Horton in Ribblesdale. Water from the tarn flows eastwards through Cowside Beck, which is a tributary of the River Skirfare in Littondale. Whilst the water in the lake is acidic, as it runs off the mountain, it flows over Yoredale beds limestone and so becomes a harder (more alkaline) water.

== Description ==
Fountains Fell Tarn occupies a shallow basin created by glacial activity in the Devensian age, which scoured the limestone away. Malham Tarn was created in a similar fashion with the removal of the porous limestone allowing water to collect. Although the tarn does not have a permanent outflow (the inflow of water almost matching that of the evaporation), in times of heavy precipitation, water from the tarn drains eastwards as Cowside Beck, (Note: Water draining southwards from Fountains Fell, forms part of the supply for the River Aire, whilst water from the tarn, forms water for the River Wharfe. Water draining off Fountains Fell to the west ends up in the River Ribble.) an affluent of the River Skirfare in Littondale. The water at the tarn site is mostly unaffected by limestone, being quite acidic from the local peat, (Note: The habitat in around Fountains Fell Tarn has been described as extreme on account of an average pH value of 3–5.) and the underlying rock of millstone grit, instead of limestone, which results in the water having a hardness value of between 3–5. However, the underlying rocks which the water drains across are limestone of the Yoredale beds and Great Scar limestone, from which the water absorbs alkalinity, so by the time it reaches the water draining off Darnbrook Fell, its hardness is rated somewhere between 19 and 25.

Fountains Fell has two peaks, 2,192 feet (668 m) at the north, and 2,172 feet (662 m) at the south. The tarn sits between the two peaks at a height of 2,116 feet (645 m) above sea level, and 4.3 miles (7 km) north west of Malham Tarn and 4.3 miles (7 km) east of Horton-in-Ribblesdale. The tarn lies fairly shallow on a flat plateau among the eroding peat bog (which supplies its acidity). The bottom of the tarn was recorded in the 1950s as being largely composed of sand with some peat encroachment.

Although the tarn is on average just 1 foot 8 inches (0.5 m) deep, it is estimated to have an average volume of 3,000,000 cubic feet (86,000 m^{3}). It is often frozen for long periods of time during the winter due to its height near the summit of Fountains Fell. Between 1949 and 1955, snow was recorded to have fallen on average of 47 days every year and an average air temperature of 7 °C (40 °F). By the period of 1992 to 1997, the average air temperature had risen to 7.2 °C (40 °F) with at least 129 days of cloud cover in 1995.

Water bugs and water beetles were found to be present in the tarn, but freshwater shrimp (gammarus pulex) was absent. This was attributed to the low calcium levels in the tarn, as the species was abundant in the streams and becks draining from it.

The tarn is accessible from the Pennine Way, which runs across Fountains Fell to the east of the tarn.

== Water pH values ==
Comparison of pH values
Name	1958	August 1980	April 1981	August 1981	September 2003
Fountains Fell Tarn	3.6	3.92	4.25	4.11	3.7
Malham Tarn	8.0	7.98	8.37	8.59	N/A

Fountains Fell Tarn's inflow is precipitation, whereas, most of the water in Malham Tarn has arrived from streams and becks which flow over limestone, accruing alkalinity as it travels over the bedrock.

== Naming ==
The tarn is named after the mountain it is located on; Fountains Fell. This was first recorded as Fountains Fell in 1540, named after Fountains Abbey who owned the sheep pasture rights on the mountain. (Note: Whilst the abbey was dissolved in 1539 on order of Henry VIII, the rights to farm on the fell would have been extant from the abbey's inception (c. 1132). This is the first written record of the name Fountains Fell.) The first written record of the name Fountains Fell Tarn, was in 1858, with the word tarn, a commonplace name for upland lakes, deriving from the Old Scandinavian tjǫrn. On the road through Silverdale, between Pen-y-ghent and Fountains Fell, to Halton Gill, lies the Ulfkil Cross base. The cross records the boundary between Stainforth and Malham Moor townships, and in written records lists the mountain (Fountains Fell as Gnup) and the tarn as Suartecumbe.

Sometimes the lake is recorded as Fountains Tarn.

== See also ==
- List of lakes and tarns in North Yorkshire
