= Malham-Arncliffe =

Protected area in North Yorkshire, England

Coordinates: 54.100634°N 2.1177138°W

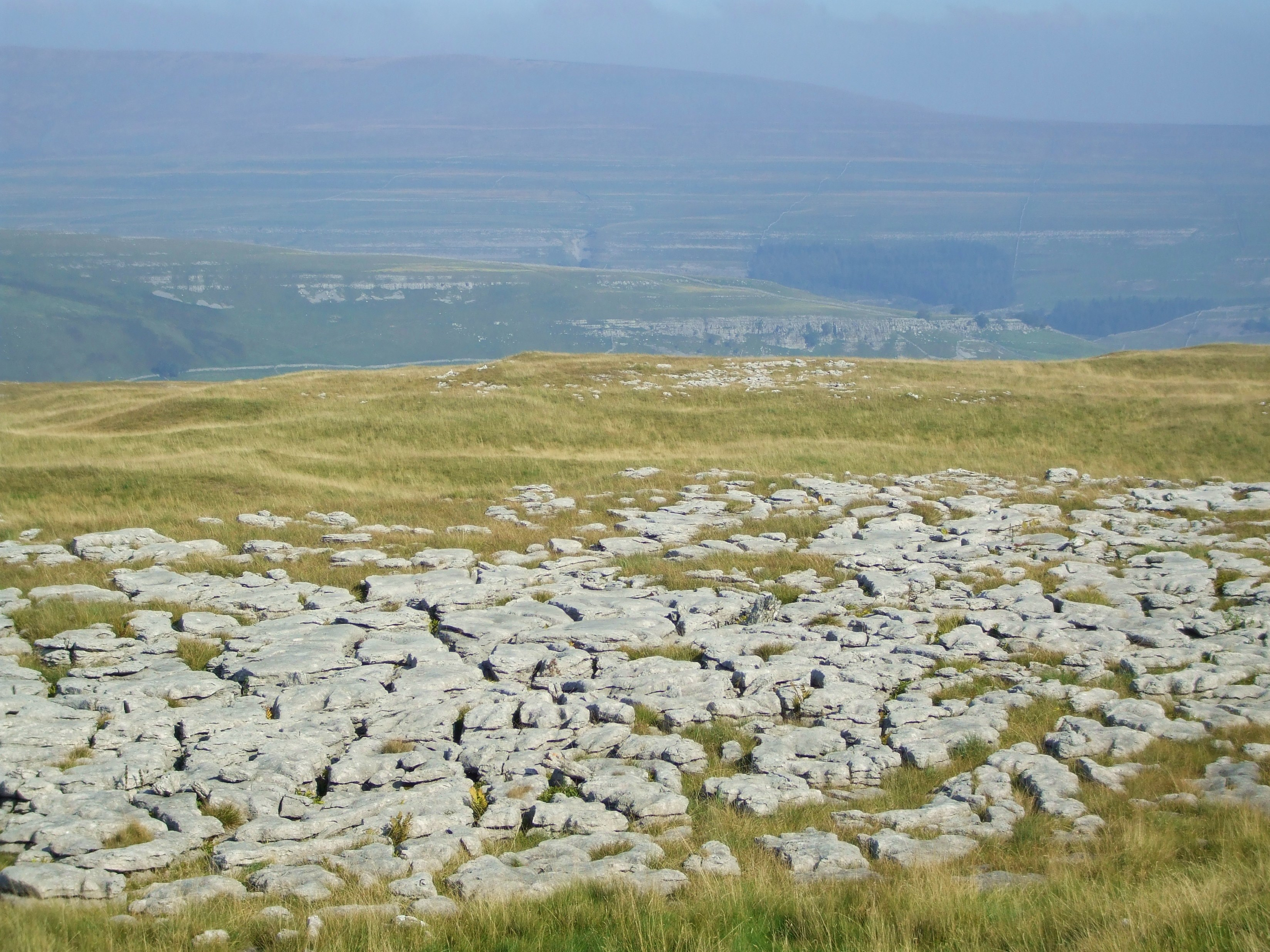
Hawkswick Clowder within Malham-Arncliffe SSSI

Malham-Arncliffe is a Site of Special Scientific Interest (SSSI) within Yorkshire Dales National Park in North Yorkshire, England. This protected area extends from the village of Malham in the south to the village of Arncliffe in the north and includes Malham Tarn lake and Malham Tarn National Nature Reserve. In the east, this protected area includes the limestone pavement at Hawkswick Clowder and extends to the valley of the River Wharfe near the village of Kilnsey. Malham-Arncliffe SSSI includes Cowside valley and Gordale Scar. Malham-Arncliffe is protected for both its biological and geological interest.

== Biology ==
Grassland plants include limestone bedstraw , wild thyme, small scabious, salad burnet, common rock-rose, Jacob's-ladder, bird's-eye primrose, butterwort and grass-of-Parnassus. Montane plant species include alpine cinquefoil, mountain avens and mountain everlasting. In wet calcareous areas, moss species include Catoscopium nigritum, Meesia uliginosa and Orthothecium rufescens (genus Orthothecium). Where past mining has led to metal rich soil, plant species include alpine penny-cress and spring sandwort.

Plant species within the limestone pavement include dog's mercury, wood anemone, ramsons, baneberry, angular Solomon's-seal and downy currant. Fern species in the grikes of the limestone pavement include limestone fern, rigid buckler-fern and holly fern.

Field House Wood and Tarn House Wood plant species include Aria rupicola and dark-red helleborine. Wedber Wood supports the mollusc species Claucilia dubia and Vitrea subrimata.

Bird species in this protected area include curlew, lapwing, redshank and snipe. There are house martin colonies on limestone cliffs.

== Geology ==
Most of the area is underlaid by Carboniferous Great Scar Limestone with large cave systems. Dowkabottom and Sleet's Gill caves are ancient, possibly pre-glacial cave systems. The peat deposit of Tarn Moss contains a pollen record from the late Glacial period to the present day that provides evidence of changes in vegetation. Soils derived from glacial drift overlie the limestone in places and are associated with neutral or acidic grasslands.

== Land ownership ==
Part of the land within Malham-Arncliffe SSSI is owned by the National Trust (Malham Tarn Estate).The land owned by the National Trust includes Malham Tarn, Great Close Scar, East Great Close and Middle House Hill.
