= Malham Tarn Estate =

National Trust agricultural estate in North Yorkshire, England

Coordinates: 54.095°N 2.165°W

Malham Tarn Estate is a National Trust property in North Yorkshire, England.

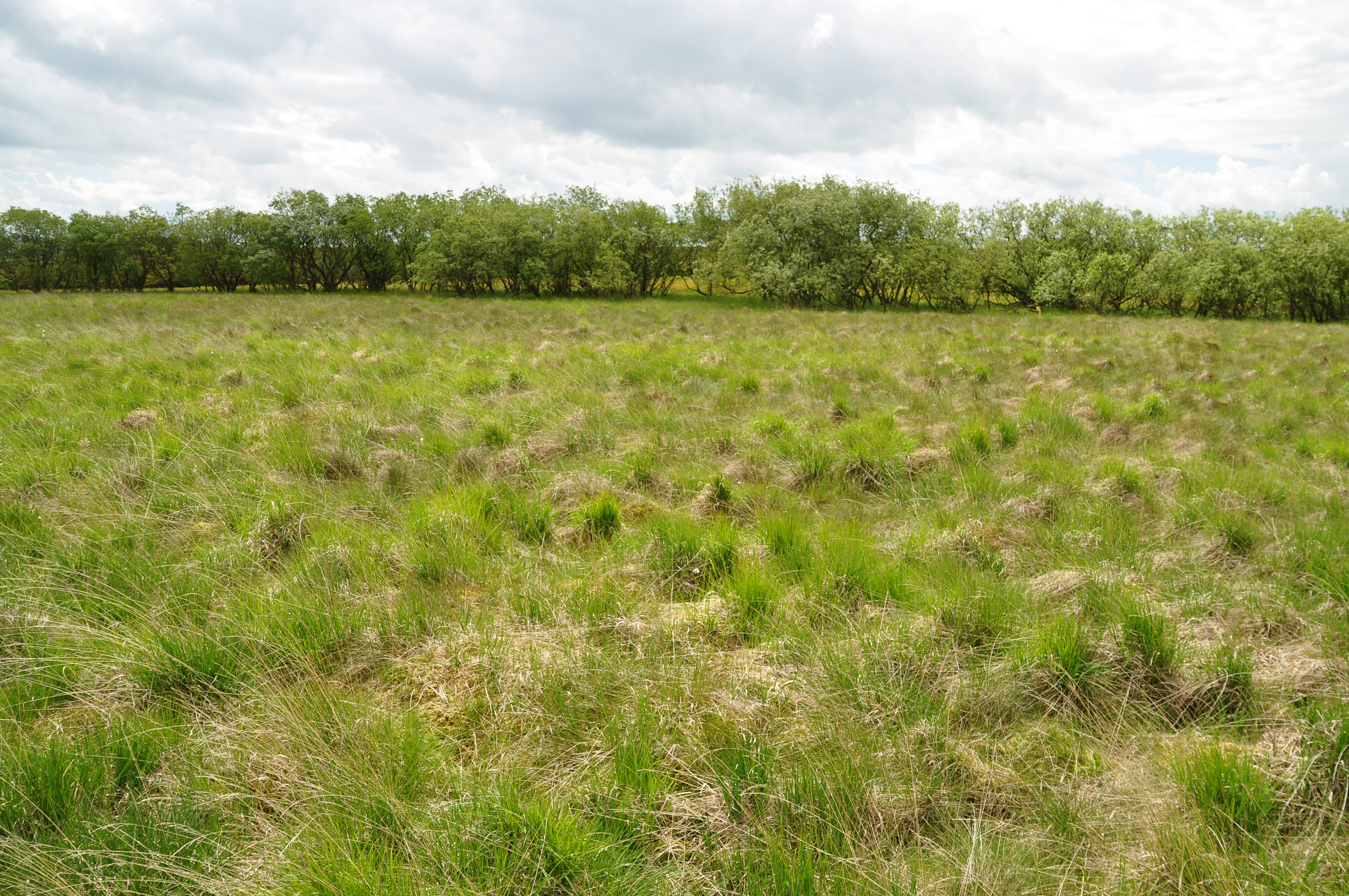
Grassland and woodland in Malham Tarn NNR

The estate is located in the Pennines and lies between Wharfedale and Ribblesdale. It covers 2,900 hectares (7,200 acres) and includes around 65 hectares (160 acres) of woodland. The majority of the land is used by six holdings who operate based on agricultural tenancies and grazing licences for cows and sheep.

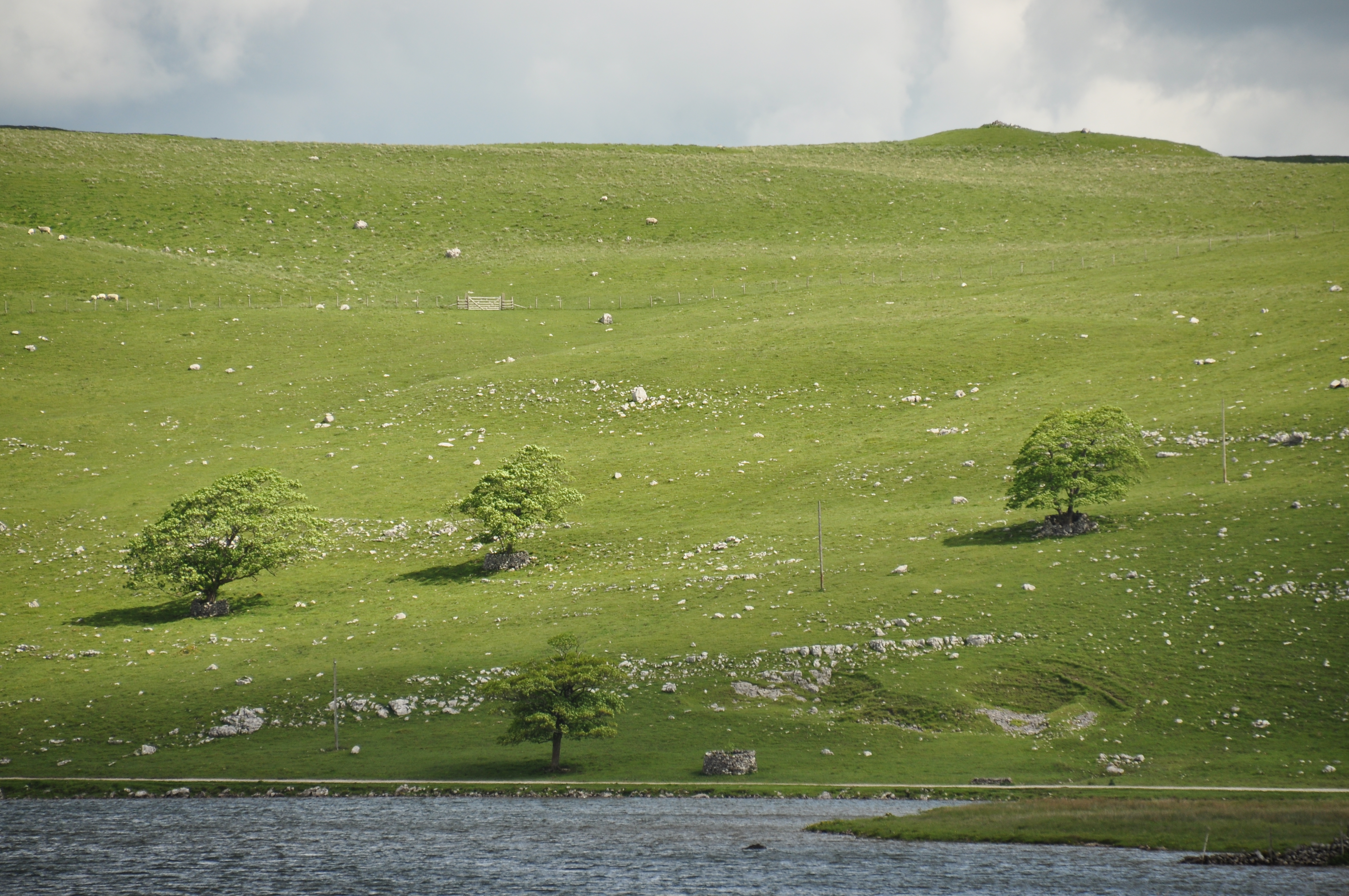
Part of the Nature Reserve on the shore of Malham Tarn

Malham Tarn, a glacial lake just outside Malham, along with the surrounding wetlands, were given National Nature Reserve status in 1992. Under the Ramsar Convention it was declared a wetland of international importance in 1993. The Tarn is home to perch and brown trout, with fly fishing of the trout allowed with a daily pass.

The property consists of six farms and a National Nature Reserve around Malham Tarn.
