= Birks Fell =

Mountain in North Yorkshire, England

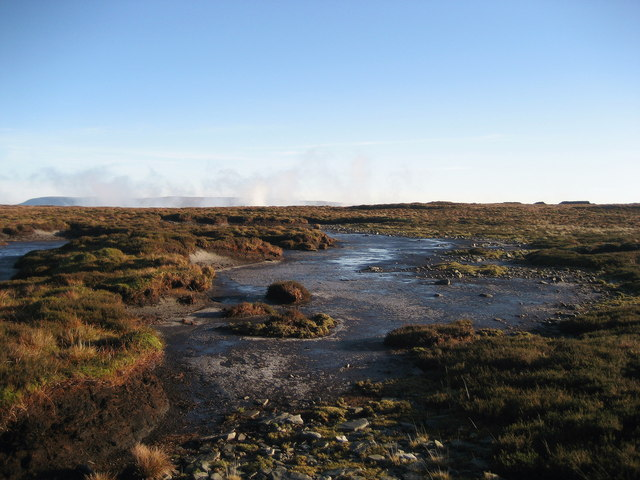
- Frozen Peat on Birks Fell

Highest point
- Elevation: 610 m (2,000 ft)
- Parent peak: Pen-y-ghent
- Listing: Marilyn
- Coordinates: 54°10′59″N 2°07′33″W

Geography
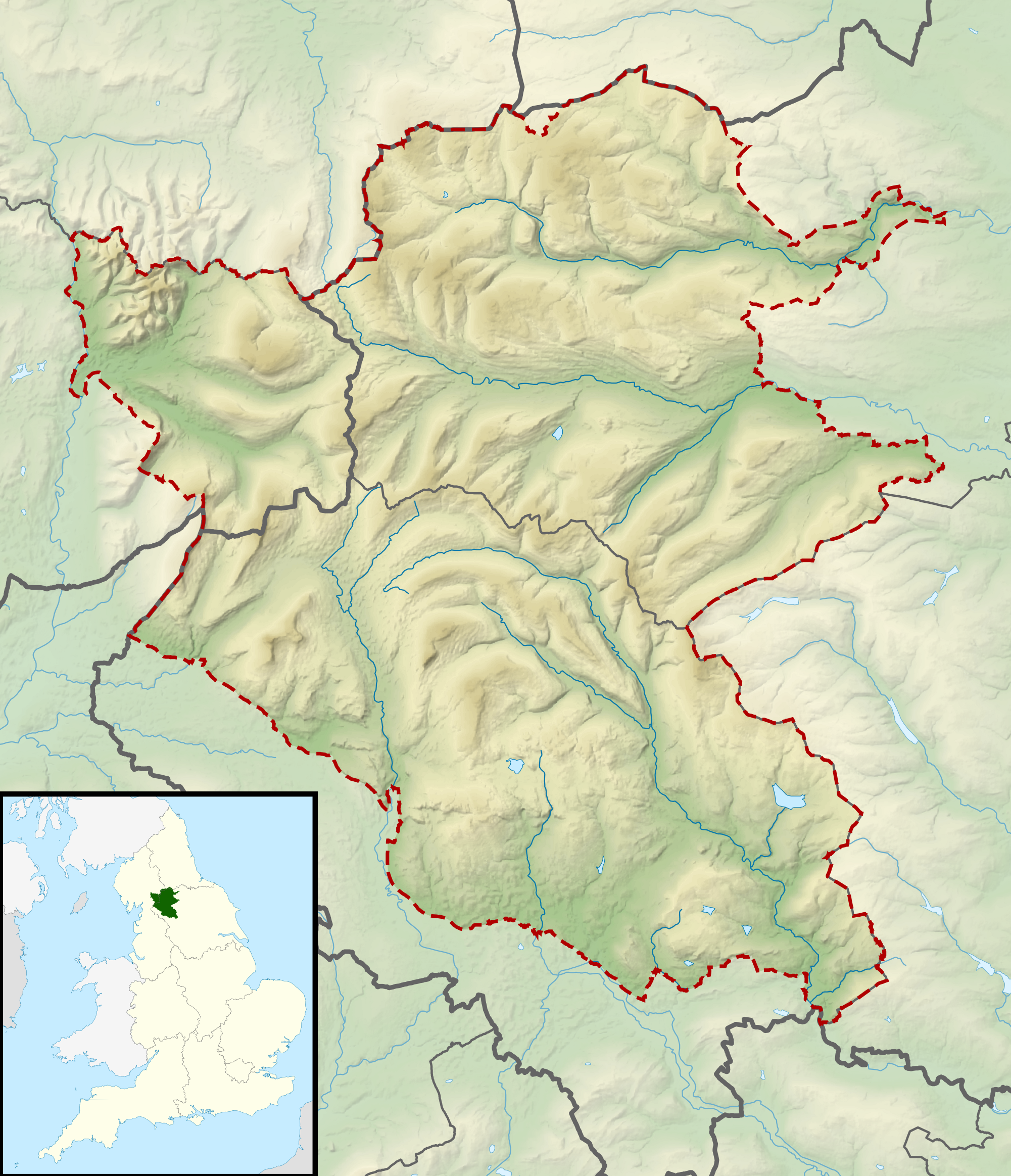
- Location within Yorkshire Dales
- Location: North Yorkshire, England
- Parent range: Southern Yorkshire Dales
- OS grid: SD918763

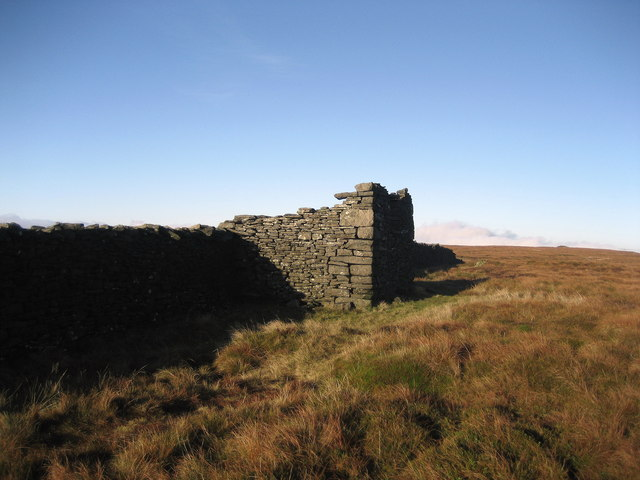
Ruins on Birks Fell

Birks Fell is a hill in the Yorkshire Dales, near to Hubberholme in North Yorkshire, England. It is classed as a Marilyn (a hill with topographic prominence of at least 150m). Birks Fell only became an official Marilyn in 2006 as it was resurveyed and discovered to be 610 metres (2,001 ft) and not 608 metres (1,995 ft) as previously thought. Books from the late 19th and early 20th centuries list the hill as being 2,001 feet (610 m) and it is thought that in the conversion to metric, the hill lost some height. This raises it above neighbouring Horse Head Moor (609 m), making it the Marilyn in place of Horse Head Moor.

Between the summit and a trig point (1 mile (1.6 km) to the south west) lies Birks Tarn, which is one or the largest tarns in the Yorkshire Dales. It is prevented from leaking through the bedrock underneath by its impermeable layers and additionally held back by the peaty soil. The section at the top of the fell is a wide ridge that offers excellent walking and "outstanding views".

The eastern slope of the fell was mined for lead between 1699 and 1815. Ruined buildings that were formerly used in the metal winning process still dot the landscape.

The name Birks derives from the Old Norse word for birch; the lower slopes of the hill used to be covered in them.
