= Priest's Tarn =

Upland lake in Yorkshire, England

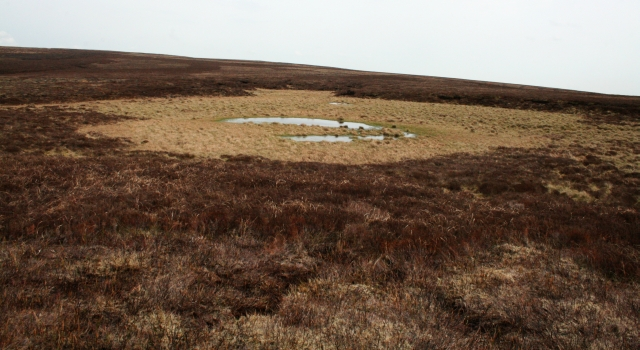
- Priest's Tarn on Grassington Moor

- Location within North Yorkshire
- Location: Grassington Moor, North Yorkshire
- Coordinates: 54.121°N 1.959°W
- Primary outflows: Crag Grainings; Blea Beck
- Basin countries: England
- Surface area: 1-hectare (2.5-acre)
- Surface elevation: 516.5 metres (1,695 ft)

Priest's Tarn is an upland lake on Grassington Moor, in North Yorkshire, England. The water from Priest's Tarn was historically used for hydraulic mining purposes during the lead industry on Grassington Moor. The flow of water largely exits the hill to the south-east into Grimwith Reservoir, which in turn feeds into the River Wharfe. Walkers have observed that the tarn is looking like it is drying up.

== Description ==
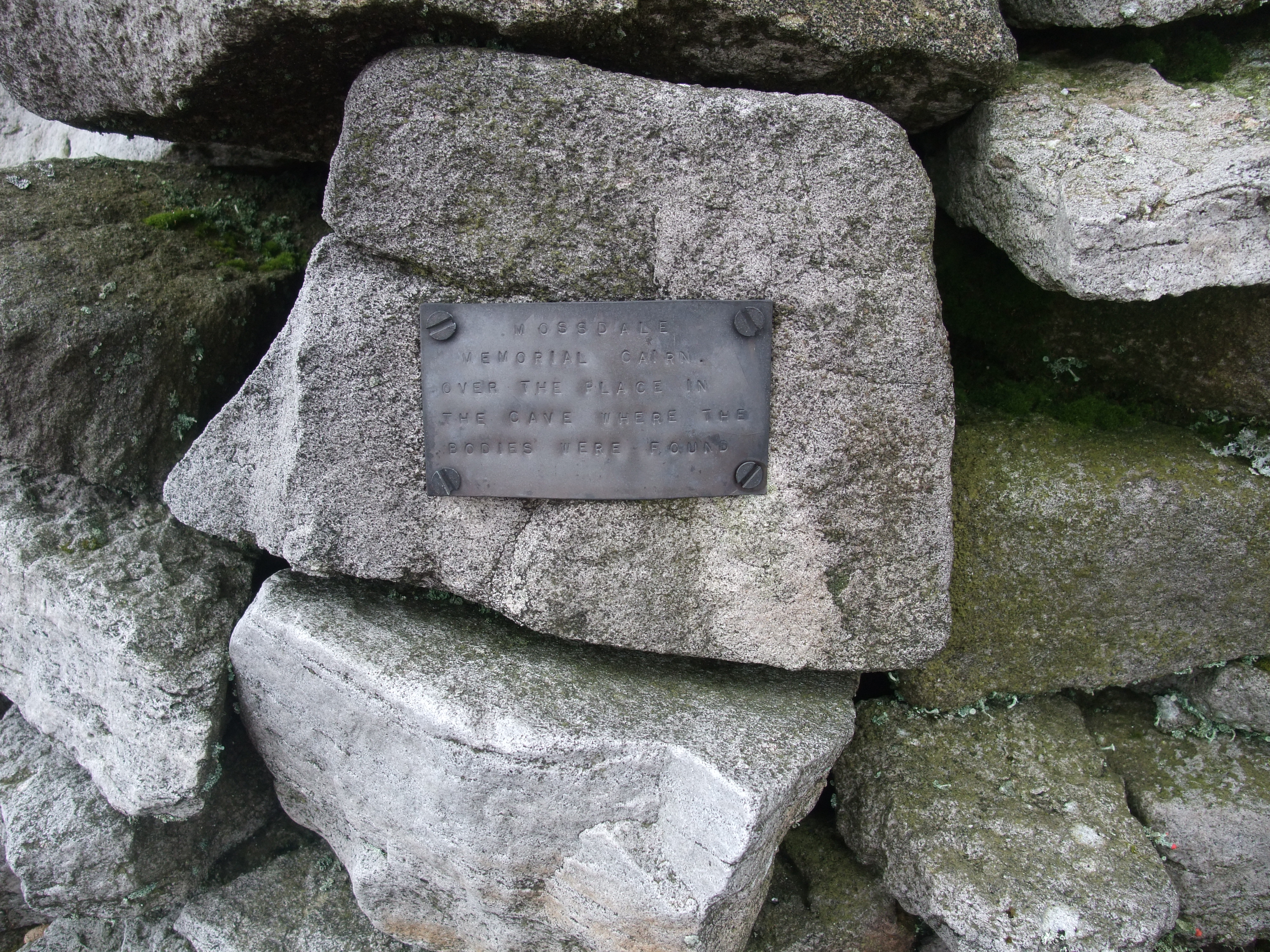
Mossdale memorial cairn

Water exiting from Priest's Tarn flows south firstly through Crag Grainings and then into Blea Beck. Water was canalised here to feed the dams of the Grassington Moor lead industry. The water flows to Grimwith Reservoir, some 5.3 kilometres (3.3 mi) to the south-east of the tarn, which feeds into the River Wharfe.

Walkers who have navigated to the tarn, state that it has largely dried up in comparison to the expanse shown on Ordnance Survey maps. The average annual rainfall between 1916 and 1955 was 1,549 millimetres (61 in), and between 1941 and 1970, it was 1,501 millimetres (59.1 in).

Stones from the tarn were taken to a point a few hundred metres to the south-west of the tarn to build a memorial cairn for those who died in the Mossdale Cavern tragedy of 1967. The cairn marks the spot above ground where the bodies of six cavers were found after they had drowned in a flash flood underground. Priest's Tarn sits atop the Black Keld Catchment SSSI; one of the largest and deepest cave drainage systems in England.

The western boundary of the civil parish of Grassington goes through the north-west of the tarn, and access to the tarn is via many paths in the area. One of the beds of sandstone on Grassington Moor has been named Priest's Tarn Grit. The etymology of the name of the tarn is unsure, having been recorded in its earliest form in 1717.

== Rainfall ==
Meteorological table are available online from the UK Meteorological office. A selection of the results for Priest's Tarn are given below.

Year	Rainfall (annual)	Ref
1966	1,731 millimetres (68.1 in)	
1967	1,777 millimetres (70 in)	
1968	1,642 millimetres (64.6 in)	
1969	1,323 millimetres (52.1 in)	
1973	1,256 millimetres (49.4 in)	
