= Malham Moor =

Civil parish in North Yorkshire, England

Coordinates: 54.105°N 2.178°W

- Civil parish
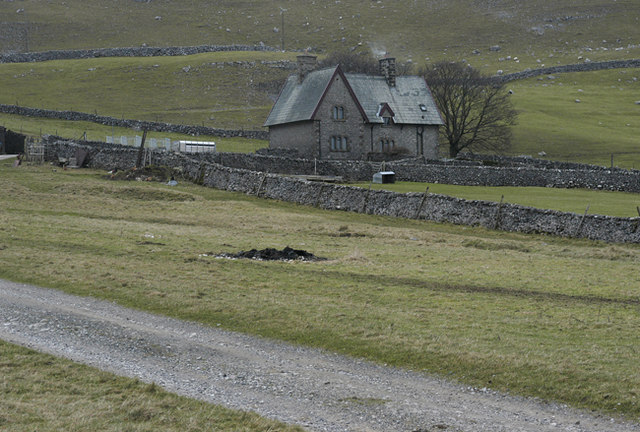
- Farm in Malham Moor

- Population: 70 (2015)
- OS grid reference: SD870665
- Civil parish: Malham Moor
- Unitary authority: North Yorkshire
- Ceremonial county: North Yorkshire
- Region: Yorkshire and the Humber
- Country: England
- Sovereign state: United Kingdom
- Post town: SETTLE
- Postcode district: BD24
- Police: North Yorkshire
- Fire: North Yorkshire
- Ambulance: Yorkshire

Malham Moor is a civil parish in the county of North Yorkshire, England. Its population was estimated at 70 in 2015.

It has a joint parish council, Kirkby Malhamdale Parish Council, with the parishes of Malham, Kirkby Malham and Hanlith.

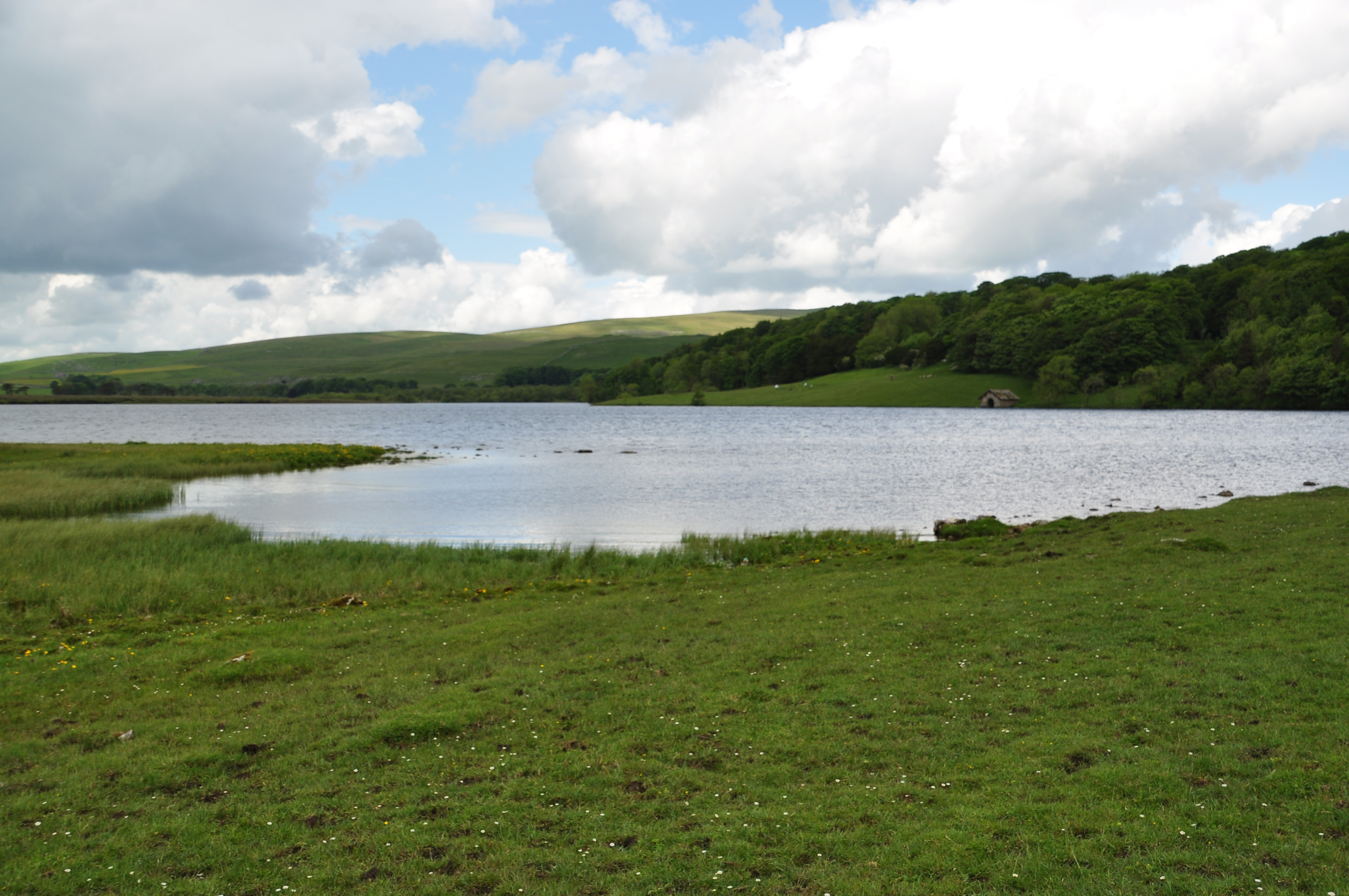
Malham Tarn

There is no village in the parish. The parish includes scattered farms and houses, Malham Tarn and large areas of moorland, including Fountains Fell. The upland area identified on Ordnance Survey maps as Malham Moor lies outside the parish, to the east. It is north west of Threshfield along Malham Moor Lane. Its summit is at 411m.(SD952648)

Malham Moor was historically a township in the ancient parish of Kirkby Malham in the West Riding of Yorkshire. It became a civil parish in 1866, and in 1974 was transferred to the new county of North Yorkshire. From 1974 to 2023 it was part of the Craven District, it is now administered by the unitary North Yorkshire Council.

== See also ==
- Listed buildings in Malham Moor
