= Fountains Fell =

Mountain in North Yorkshire, England

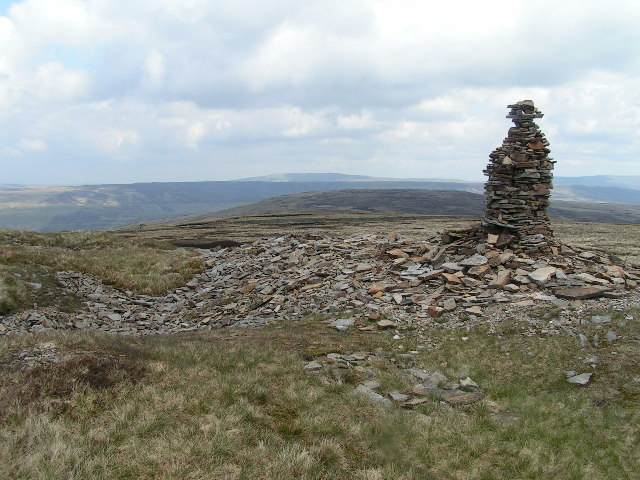
- Cairn on Fountains Fell

Highest point
- Elevation: 668 m (2,192 ft)
- Prominence: 243 m (797 ft)
- Parent peak: Pen-y-ghent
- Listing: Marilyn
- Coordinates: 54°08′23″N 02°12′34″W

Geography
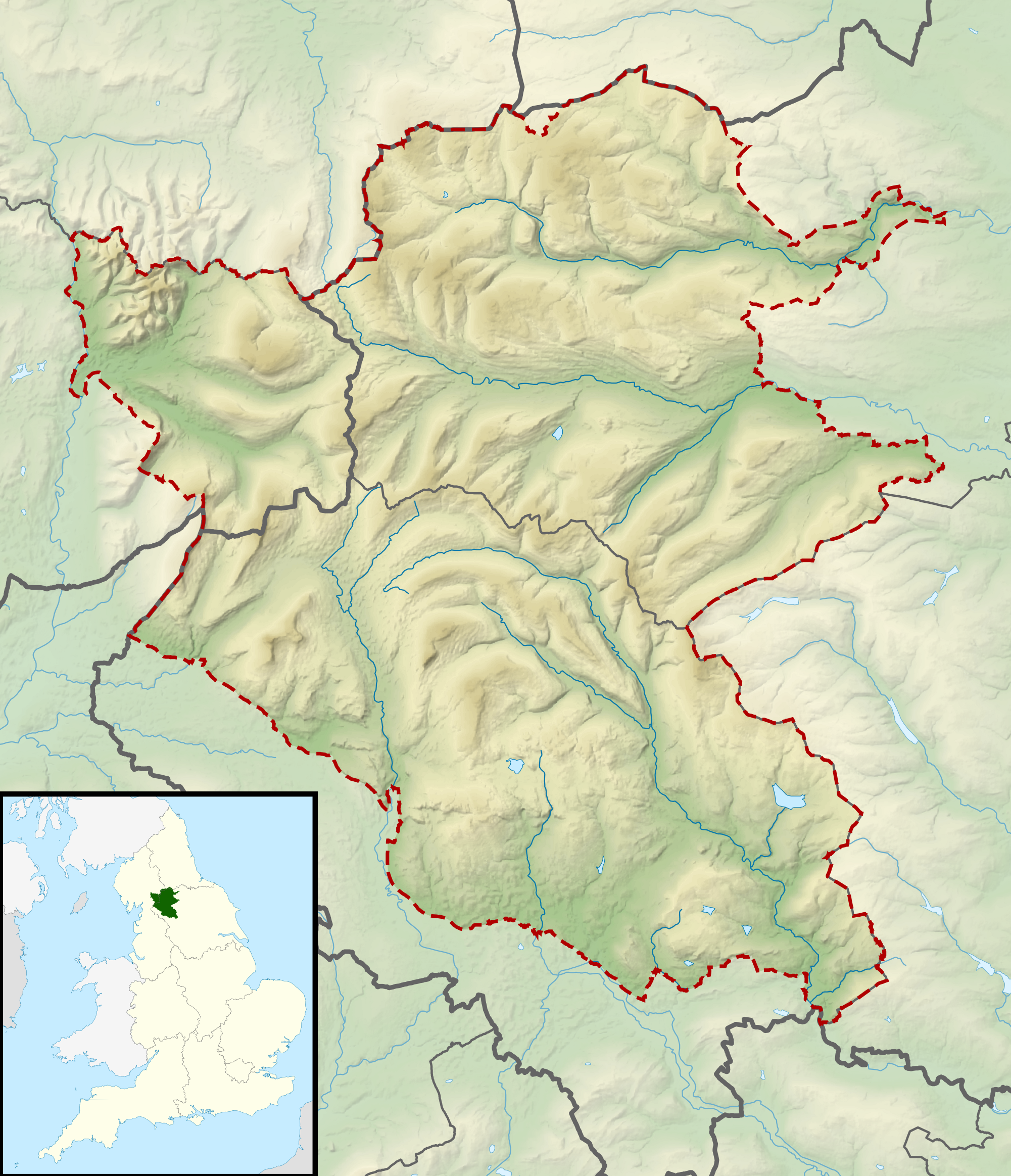
- Location within Yorkshire Dales
- Location: Yorkshire Dales
- Parent range: Pennines
- OS grid: SD864716
- Topo map: OS Landranger 98 or OL 2

Fountains Fell is a mountain in the Yorkshire Dales, England. The main summit (SD864716) has a height of 668 metres (2,192 ft) and a relative height or topographic prominence of 243 metres (797 ft) and thus qualifies as a Marilyn. Its subsidiary, Fountains Fell South Top (SD868708) reaches 662 metres (2,172 ft) and qualifies as a Nuttall. A third summit, further south at SD868697, reaches 610 metres (2,001 ft) and is the most southerly 2,000 ft summit in the Pennines north of the Peak District.

The eastern slopes of the fell form part of the National Trust's Malham Tarn and Moor estate.

== History ==
The name Fountains derives from ownership of the land in the 13th century by the Cistercian monks of Fountains Abbey (25 miles (40 km) to the east, near Ripon), who used it for sheep grazing. Coal was mined on the summit from 1790 to 1860, and was used for lead smelting in the area. There are various pits and shafts on and near the summit, and the remains of a coke oven building.

== Pennine Way ==
The Pennine Way crosses Fountains Fell about a third of a mile north of the summit. For the northbound walker this is 85 miles (137 km) from the start of the way at Edale, and is the first point where the way climbs higher than Kinder Scout's 636 metres (2,087 ft) which was reached soon after the start. It is 8 miles (13 km) along the Pennine Way from Malham village to the summit of Fountains Fell, the route climbing up beside the dramatic cliffs of Malham Cove and passing Malham Tarn before climbing up the east side of the fell. The route continues down the western slopes of the fell and ascends the southern ridge of Pen-y-ghent, reached after 3.5 miles (6 km): this summit of 694 metres (2,277 ft) then supplants Fountains Fell as the highest point yet reached on the Pennine Way.

== Caving ==
There are several caves of interest to cavers on Fountains Fell, including Antler Hole, Dalehead Pot, Echo Hole, Fornagh Gill, Gingling Pot, Hammer Pot and Magnetometer Pot.

== See also ==
- Fountains Fell Tarn, a natural lake between the two peaks on Fountains Fell
