= Malham Tarn =

Natural upland lake in North Yorkshire, England

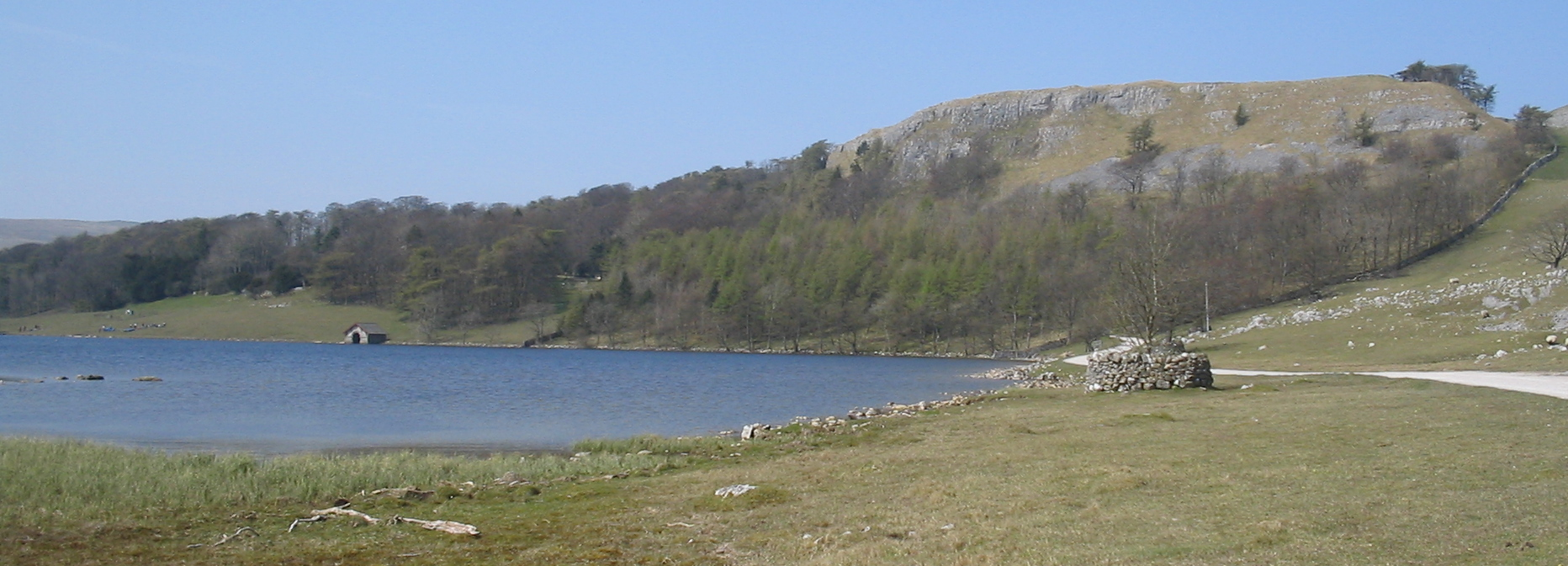
- A view of the north-east corner of Malham Tarn

- Location within North Yorkshire

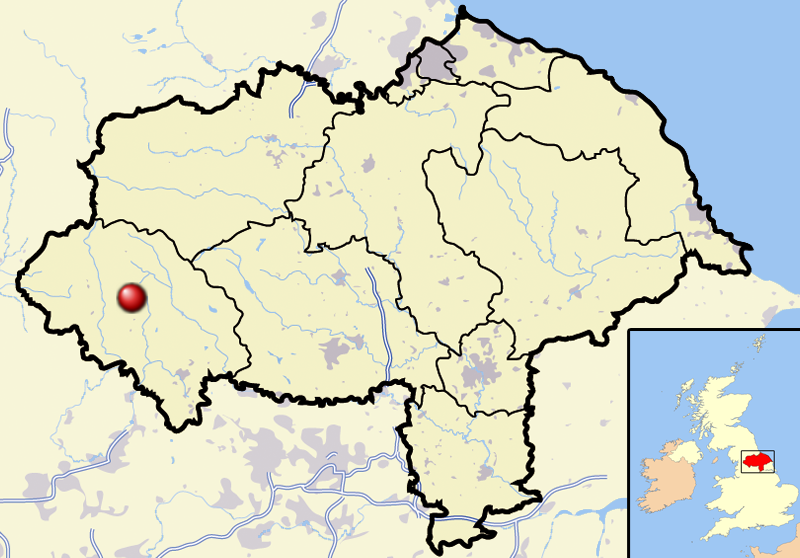
- Malham Tarn shown within North Yorkshire
- Location: Yorkshire Dales, England
- Coordinates: 54°05′45″N 2°10′0″W
- Type: Glacial
- Catchment area: 6 km^{2} (2.3 sq mi)
- Basin countries: United Kingdom
- Surface area: 0.62 km^{2} (0.24 sq mi)
- Average depth: 2.4 m (7.9 ft)
- Max. depth: 4.4 m (14 ft)
- Residence time: 11 weeks
- Surface elevation: 377 m (1,237 ft)

Ramsar Wetland
- Designated: 28 October 1993
- Reference no.: 634

Malham Tarn is a glacial lake near the village of Malham in the Yorkshire Dales, England. The lake is one of only eight upland alkaline lakes in Europe. At an altitude of 377 metres (1,237 ft) above sea level it is the highest marl lake in the United Kingdom. Its geology, flora and fauna have led to it being listed under a number of conservation designations. The site is currently owned by the National Trust, who used to lease part of the site to the Field Studies Council but this closed as a field centre in 2022. The site was the inspiration for Charles Kingsley's 1863 novel The Water-Babies, A Fairy Tale for a Land Baby.

== Geography ==
Malham Tarn is situated in the Yorkshire Dales, a national park in the Yorkshire Pennines. It lies approximately 25 miles (40 km) north-west of Bradford and about 2.5 miles (4 km) north of the nearest settlement, Malham.

At 377 metres (1,237 ft) above sea level it is sometimes, but erroneously, considered the highest lake in England, but there are lakes at higher altitudes such as Innominate Tarn. It is, however, the highest marl lake in Great Britain. The lake is one of only eight upland alkaline lakes in Europe, having a pH between 8.0 and 8.6. The catchment area of the lake is 600 hectares (6.0 km^{2}; 2.3 sq mi) and the main inflow is a stream at the lake's north-west corner. The lake is 4.4 metres (14 ft) at its deepest, with an average depth of 2.4 metres (7.9 ft) and the surface area is 62 hectares (0.62 km^{2}; 0.24 sq mi). It takes approximately 11 weeks for water to leave the lake after it has entered. The primary outflow is a small stream at the southern end of the lake. The outflow stream goes underground after approximately 500 metres (1,600 ft) before emerging downstream of Malham Cove as a source of the River Aire.

=== Climate ===
The highest recorded temperature at Malham Tarn was 28.6°C on 24 July 2019.

Climate data for Malham Tarn, elevation: 391 m (1,283 ft), 1991–2020 normals, extremes 1960–present
Month	Jan	Feb	Mar	Apr	May	Jun	Jul	Aug	Sep	Oct	Nov	Dec	Year
Record high °C (°F)	12.5 (54.5)	15.3 (59.5)	19.1 (66.4)	21.0 (69.8)	24.0 (75.2)	27.2 (81.0)	28.6 (83.5)	28.2 (82.8)	24.4 (75.9)	20.1 (68.2)	15.2 (59.4)	12.9 (55.2)	28.6 (83.5)
Mean daily maximum °C (°F)	4.8 (40.6)	5.2 (41.4)	7.2 (45.0)	10.0 (50.0)	13.2 (55.8)	15.6 (60.1)	17.4 (63.3)	17.0 (62.6)	14.7 (58.5)	11.1 (52.0)	7.6 (45.7)	5.3 (41.5)	10.8 (51.4)
Daily mean °C (°F)	2.5 (36.5)	2.7 (36.9)	4.1 (39.4)	6.4 (43.5)	9.4 (48.9)	12.0 (53.6)	13.8 (56.8)	13.6 (56.5)	11.5 (52.7)	8.4 (47.1)	5.2 (41.4)	2.9 (37.2)	7.7 (45.9)
Mean daily minimum °C (°F)	0.2 (32.4)	0.1 (32.2)	1.0 (33.8)	2.8 (37.0)	5.5 (41.9)	8.4 (47.1)	10.3 (50.5)	10.2 (50.4)	8.2 (46.8)	5.6 (42.1)	2.8 (37.0)	0.5 (32.9)	4.7 (40.5)
Record low °C (°F)	−11.5 (11.3)	−13.0 (8.6)	−13.5 (7.7)	−7.5 (18.5)	−4.2 (24.4)	−1.1 (30.0)	1.7 (35.1)	2.1 (35.8)	−1.0 (30.2)	−4.9 (23.2)	−9.2 (15.4)	−14.1 (6.6)	−14.1 (6.6)
Average precipitation mm (inches)	164.9 (6.49)	137.9 (5.43)	117.6 (4.63)	91.9 (3.62)	90.9 (3.58)	99.8 (3.93)	118.3 (4.66)	134.2 (5.28)	128.6 (5.06)	156.6 (6.17)	165.6 (6.52)	181.3 (7.14)	1,587.4 (62.50)
Average precipitation days (≥ 1.0 mm)	17.9	15.4	14.5	12.8	12.6	13.5	14.3	15.7	13.9	16.8	18.8	18.3	184.5
Mean monthly sunshine hours	34.6	58.2	90.5	134.5	162.9	137.3	141.3	135.9	106.1	75.4	43.0	34.2	1,153.9
Source 1: Met Office
Source 2: KNMI

== Natural history ==
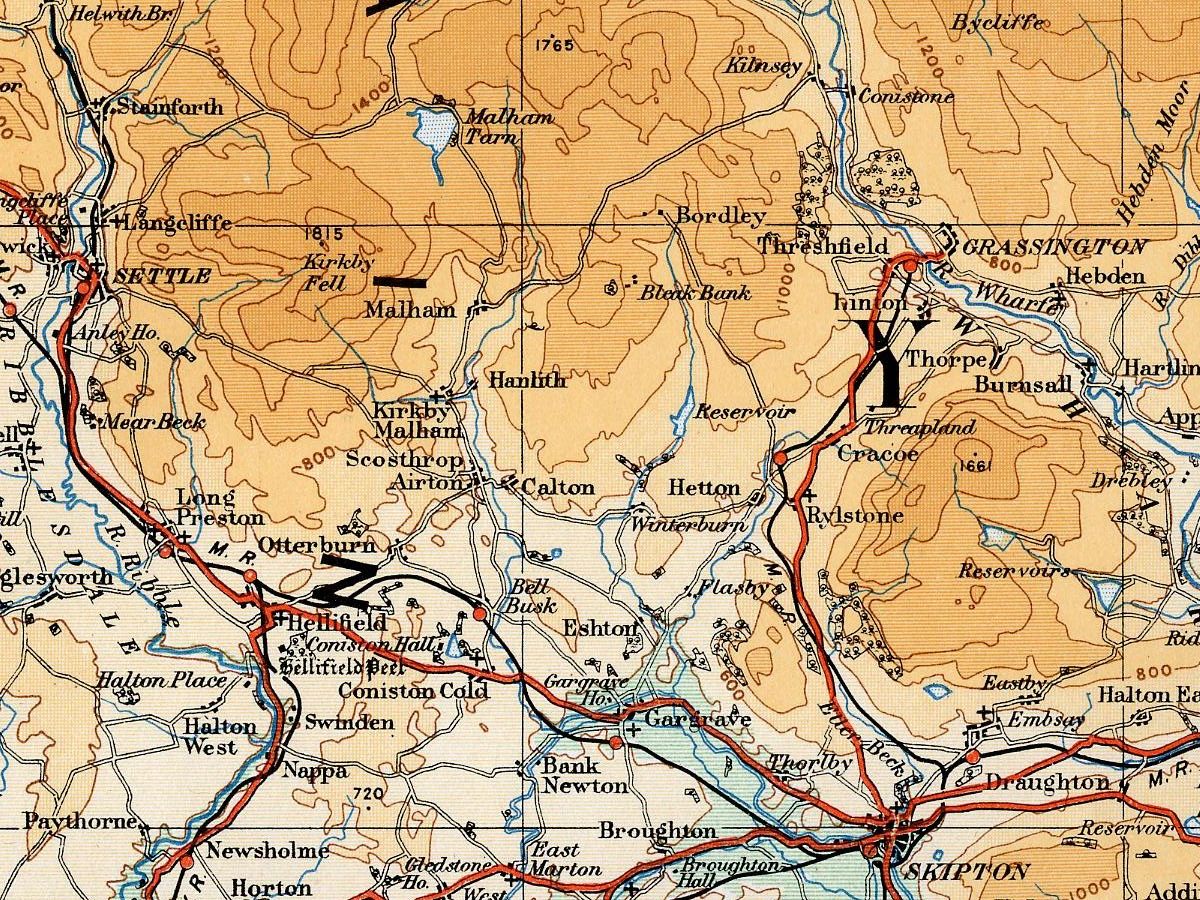
The position of Malham Tarn in the southern Yorkshire Dales

Situated in a limestone area, Malham Tarn itself mainly lies on a bed of silurian slate which is covered with marl deposits. The lake's basin was dammed by a moraine at the end of the last glacial period, approximately 10,000 years ago. It used to be about twice its current size, having shrunk due to silting at the western shore; this has formed a boggy region called Tarn Moss. Following deforestation during the Iron Age, the land surrounding the lake has been used for grazing which has prevented further tree growth. An embankment and sluice gate were added to the lake in 1791 by Lord Ribblesdale; this has had the effect of raising the level of the lake by approximately 4 feet (1.2 m). The average annual rainfall over the catchment area is 1,542.5 millimetres (61 in).

The lake is home to six species of fish, as well as white-clawed crayfish, great crested grebes, moorhens, coots, tufted ducks and teal. A number of waders such as redshanks, curlews, lapwings and oystercatchers breed in the surrounding area. Two rare benthic copepods, Bryocamptus rhaeticus and Moraria mrazeki, are found in the lake, along with 22 species of molluscs—nine of which are found at their highest altitude in Britain. The lake also contains a number of submerged aquatic plants, while the surrounding area is home to a diverse number of plants including wild cranberry, bearberry, crowberry, dark-leaved willow and purple moor grass. Last seen fifty years ago, captive-bred water voles (Arvicola amphibius) were reintroduced in August 2016. This is the highest reintroduction of water vole in the UK.

The lake is located in the Malham and Arncliffe Site of Special Scientific Interest which was established in 1955. In 1992, the lake and its wetlands were designated as a national nature reserve. The lake was listed as a Ramsar Convention site in 1993. It is also in the Craven Limestone Complex Special Area of Conservation.

== History ==
There has been human activity at Malham Tarn dating back to the Mesolithic era when the shores of the lake were used for camping during hunting trips for deer and wild cattle. During the Bronze and Iron Ages, the surrounding area was settled by farmers who used the land for grazing. Following the Roman conquest of Britain the upland areas were not seen as attractive and the only Roman presence in the area was a marching camp on Malham Moor. During the Medieval period the lands were owned by the Monasteries, and their use for grazing continued. A survey undertaken in 1539 at the time of the dissolution of Fountains Abbey makes note of a farmstead on the northern shore of the lake.

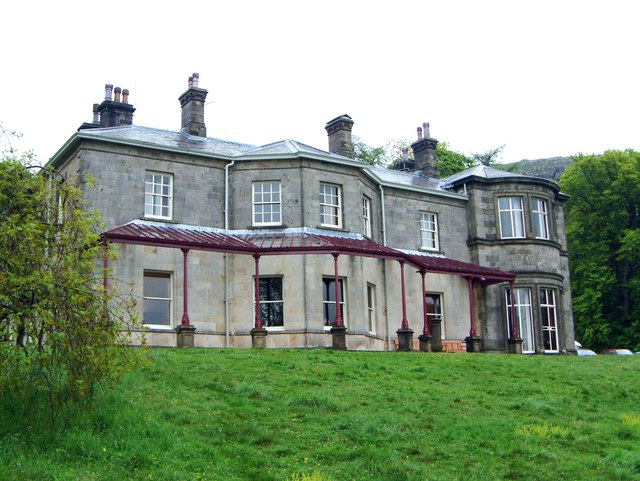
Malham Tarn House, base for the National Trust in the Yorkshire Dales

Following the dissolution of the monasteries, the estates of Malham Moor then changed hands several times until they were eventually acquired by Thomas Lister—later to become the first Lord Ribblesdale—in the mid- to late-18th century. Lister then built a hunting lodge on the site of the old farm in the 1780s. The estate was then sold to businessman James Morrison in 1852. Following Morrison's death the estates were inherited by his son, Walter, in 1857. While visiting Walter Morrison in 1858, author Charles Kingsley was inspired to write the Victorian era novel The Water-Babies, A Fairy Tale for a Land Baby. Walter Morrison died in 1921 and the estate subsequently changed hands a number of times before being broken up. The house and the lake were eventually bought by Walter Morrison's great-niece, Mrs Hutton-Croft, in 1928. In 1946 Mrs Hutton-Croft presented the house to the National Trust, who manage the property and previously leased the house to the Field Studies Council. The Field Studies Council vacated Malham Tarn House in 2023 and the house is now back under the sole occupancy of the National Trust. The house exterior and the surrounding countryside can be seen in the 1951 film Another Man's Poison.

In late 2023, the National Trust refurbished the North Wing buildings to the rear of Malham Tarn House, which are now occupied by the Trust's Yorkshire Dales staff and volunteers. The site also serves as a base for the National Trust's team of Rangers, as well as staff working on the 'Heart of the Dales' Landscape Recovery scheme.
