= Chapel-le-Dale (valley) =

Valley in the Yorkshire Dales, England

- Chapel Dale; Doedale; Twisleton Dale; Upper Gretadale; Wisedale (Weasedale) [archaic]
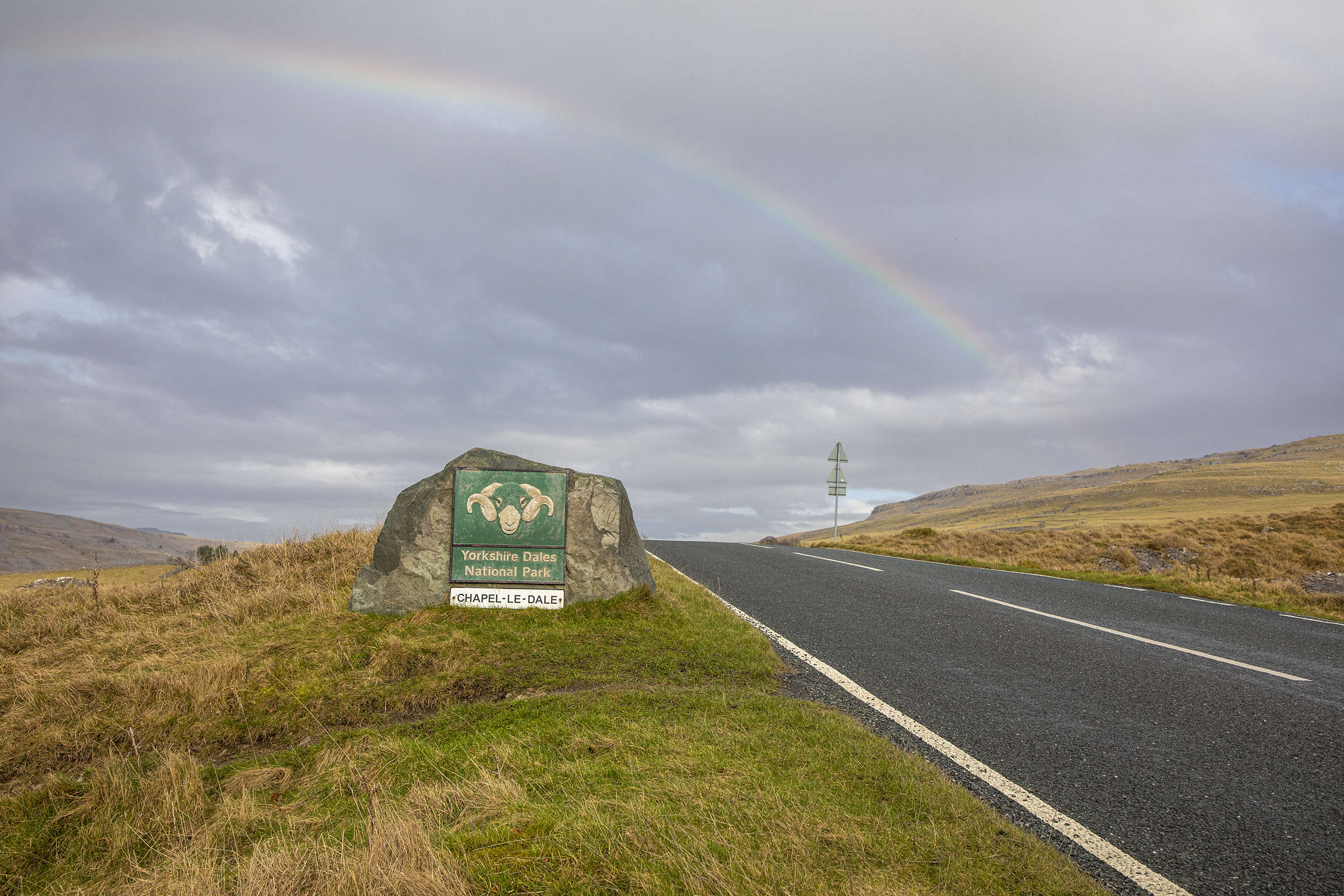
- The start of Chapel-le-Dale

- Location within North Yorkshire
- Length: 6 mi (9.7 km) North-east to south-west
- Width: 0.75 mi (1.21 km)
- Depth: 250–350 m (820–1,150 ft)

Geography
- Country: England
- Region: Yorkshire and the Humber
- Coordinates: 54.189°N 2.403°W (OS)
- River: Winterscales Beck; Chapel Beck; River Doe (River Greta)
- Interactive map of Chapel-le-Dale

Chapel-le-Dale is a west-facing valley in the Yorkshire Dales, England. The U-shaped valley of Chapel-le-Dale is one of the few which drain westwards towards the Irish Sea; however, the river that flows through the valley has several names, with the Environment Agency and the Ordnance Survey listing it as the River Doe. Some older texts insist the name of the watercourse through the dale is the River Greta, which runs from a point below the hamlet of Chapel-le-Dale, and onwards past Ingleton. The dale is sparsely populated with only one settlement, the hamlet of Chapel-le-Dale, which has a small chapel.

Due to the prevalence of caves, waterfalls, chasms, mountains and natural wonders, Speight labelled the valley as one of the "wonders of Yorkshire", and another writer noting the valley's place between Ingleborough and the flanks of Whernside, said that the valley appeared as "...a green strip of silk connecting two webs of the coarseth [sic] cloth." The dale is also unusual in that it has a railway viaduct at each end.

== History ==
Chapel-le-Dale lies between the two highest mountains in Yorkshire; Ingleborough to the south, and Whernside to the north. (Note: The surveys mentioned by Bogg were later surpassed showing that Mickle Fell was the highest mountain in Yorkshire, and Whernside the second highest. In 1974, Mickle Fell was moved into Teesdale which is now part of County Durham.) The dale has several names, most are tied to the rivers in the dale, with Doedale, (Note: Ron Scholes describes a journey up the valley in his 2011 book as "Doedale to Ribblehead".) Chapeldale, and Upper Gretadale common terms for the area. Before the chapel was built in the hamlet of Chapel-le-Dale, the valley was known as Wisedale (or Wasedale/Weasdale), with the chapel building causing a name change for the valley area.

Archaeological assessment of some of the farming pastures in the upper dale suggest they were occupied from the Anglo-Saxon period (AD640 onwards), however, during the Romano-British period, the dale was traversed by a Roman Road. The B6255 road which runs up the valley on a south-west to north-east axis was originally a Roman Road linking Lancaster with Bainbridge. It was later improved as part of the Richmond to Lancaster Turnpike, and before dropping down into Ribblehead, reaches a height of 323 metres (1,059 ft). However, the Roman Road left the course of the B6255 at Chapel (the hamlet) and veered across to the north of the valley, over Chapel Beck, and now forms a minor road into Ingleton labelled on mapping as Oddies Lane. This road runs parallel to the B6255, and provides access to the Waterfalls Walk.

The Domesday Book records the whole area around Selside, Ribblesdale, Clapham, Newby and Chapel-le-Dale as being held by Thorfin of Ravensworth. Ingleton was held by Earl Tosti and belonged to the hundred of Amounderness. By the 12th century, the vaccaries (Medieval cattle farms) at Southerscales, Querneside (Whernside), and Winterscales, were in the possession of Furness Abbey. An assessment of the estates held by Furness in 1535 (just before the Dissolution) estimated that Upper Ribblesdale and Chapel-le-Dale were rated as being £76 and 9 shillings (equivalent to £57,000 in 2025). Collectively, Southerscales, Winterscales and Bruntscar were worth £24, 17 shillings and 4 pence (equivalent to £18,000 in 2025).

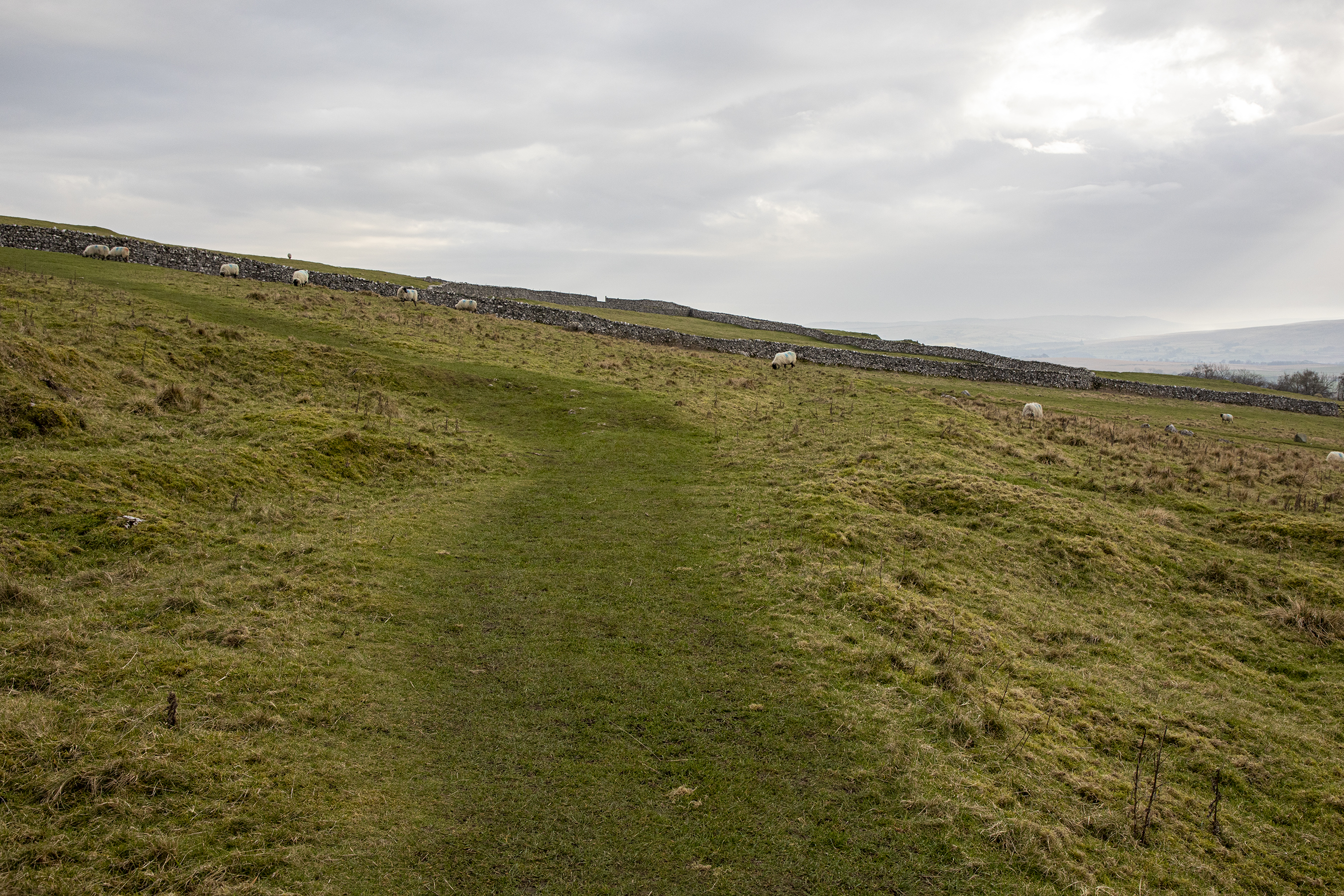
Ingleton Quarry tramway

Since the Dissolution, livestock farming has been the predominant lasting occupation for those who lived in the dale. Quarrying was carried out at the lower end of Chapel-le-Dale and many workers came in either from, or brought prosperity to Ingleton. In 2015, about eleven farms were still active in the dale, one of these was at Gunnerfleet in the upper dale which bred the renowned Gunnerfleet Limousin cattle. The nearest railway station is at the head of the dale (Ribblehead railway station on the Settle-Carlisle Line), which is 2 miles (3.2 km) east of the hamlet of Chapel-le-Dale. One railway did run up the dale, but this was to the old "granite quarry" (Note: The quarry concern was called Ingleton Granite Quarry, though the stone is not granite. The stone quarried was greywacke, a type of folded sandstone which was used in roofing. This stone is still quarried at Ingleton Quarry.) above the White Scar Caves complex. This railway only ran trains of stone down to Ingleton railway station for onward transportation, and closed down in 1924.

Walking is a popular past-time through the dale; in 1887 two Giggleswick schoolmasters inadvertently created the Three Peaks Challenge by climbing Ingleborough and seeing the good weather, descended through Chapel-le-Dale to Whernside, and later Pen-y-ghent. Wainwright's long-distance walk, a Pennine Journey, wends its way through the dale going up both valley sides. The Dales High Way crosses the valley from Ingleborough over to Dentdale. The Dales High Way at the head of the dale follows the route of the Craven Way (an ancient packhorse route) over Little Deep Dale and past Blea Moor.

=== River names ===
The confusion over river names was something that The Leeds Mercury attempted to clarify in 1890, recommending that whilst the Ordnance Survey mapping was incorrect, it was best to adopt their standard in the face of differing claims on the river names. The paper stated that the Ordnance Survey dictated that the River Greta started at the confluence of the two rivers from Kingsdale and Chapel-le-Dale some 18 metres (20 yd) upstream of the viaduct in Ingleton. The local opinion was always that the river or beck flowing down Kingsdale was the tributary of the river flowing down Chapel-le-Dale, and thus, the river upstream of the viaduct to God's Bridge was known as the River Greta.

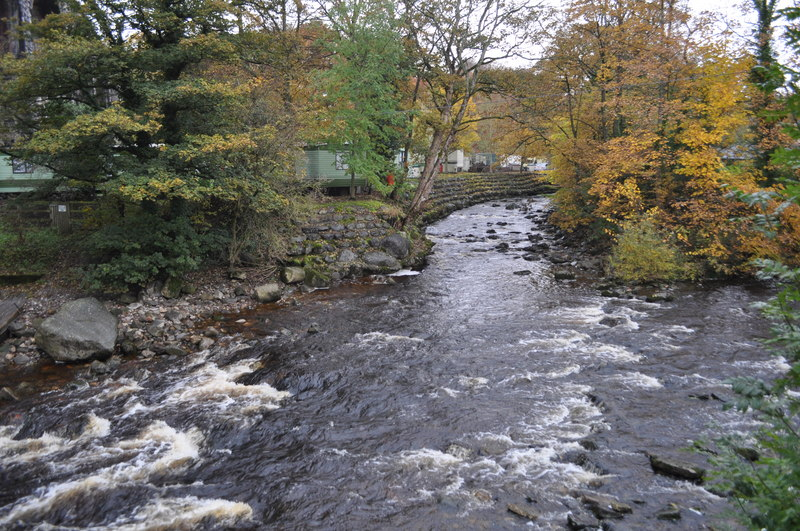
Meeting of two rivers – the waters from Kingsdale (middle), those from Chapel-le-Dale on the right

Different and interchangeable names for the rivers leading into Ingleton
| Kingsdale | Chapel-le-Dale |
|---|---|
| Kingsdale Beck (Ordnance Survey) | Winterscales Beck (Ordnance Survey) |
| River Doe | Chapel Beck (Ordnance Survey) |
| River Twiss | River Doe/Dawe (Ordnance Survey [for River Doe]) |
| Thornton Beck | River Greta/Greeta/Greetah (Bowen's map 1750) |
| Kinesdale (Saxton's map 1577) | Wease/Wase/Wise (Speed's map 1610; Tuke's map 1787) |
| River Greet | Dale Beck/Ingleton Beck |
| | River Twiss |

One book, which discusses the prevalence of caving areas in Upper Gretadale (Weathercote Cave, Gingle Pot, Hurtle Pot, Gatekirk), describes the upper waters as Chapel Beck, and what is annotated on OS mapping as the River Doe, is described as the River Greta. Alfred Wainwright's Walking in Limestone Country describes a circular clockwise walk from Ingleton travelling up Kingsdale as "..the valley of the Doe, and returning to Ingleton down the valley of the Greta." Likewise, another writer describes Ingleton as the place where the rivers Doe and Greta meet, having the river Greta named before the river's confluence. Noted writer on Dales history, Marie Hartley, states in her book, The Yorkshire Dales

Some confusion as to the nomenclature of these rivers has arisen for two reasons: a mistake on the ordnance survey map that identifies Dale Beck with the River Doe, and the existence of a variety of local names for each. We have gone by eighteenth-century guide-books, the Geological Survey of Ingleborough (1890), and by what they are called locally to-day [sic]. The River Twiss or the Dale Beck flows down Chapel-le-Dale, and the River Doe or the Thornton Beck down Kingsdale. They meet below Ingleton to become the Greta.

Ordnance Survey mapping from between 1892 and 1914 shows the River Doe to be flowing down Kingsdale, and the River Greta to be flowing down Chapel-le-Dale, and named as the Greta from God's Bridge. Modern OS mapping lists the two rivers as Kingsdale Beck, and the River Doe through Chapel-le-Dale. The River Doe runs for 6 kilometres (3.7 mi), and has the Beezley and Snow Falls waterfalls on its lower reaches.

=== Etymology ===
The dale has various names, as it extends from Ribblehead Viaduct westwards to Ingleton, and is drained by Winterscales Beck, Chapel Beck, the River Doe, and becoming the River Greta at Ingleton. As such it is known as Chapeldale, Chapel le Dale, Chapel-le-Dale, Dale Beck, Doedale, Twisleton Dale, (Note: Mike Bagshaw refers to the dale as being Twisleton Dale stating that the road to Hawes (the B6255) runs through.) and Upper Gretadale. In addition, the river through Chapel-le-Dale was historically also known as Ingleton Beck (and that through adjacent Kingsdale as Thornton Beck). The common name for the dale is taken from the chapel in the hamlet of Chapel-le-Dale (the chapel of St Leonard).

| Name | Meaning | Notes | Ref |
|---|---|---|---|
| Bruntscar | Burnt hill-side | | |
| Chapel-le-Dale | The chapel in the dale | Originally known as Wisedale, it was recorded as 'Chappell ith Dale' in 1677 | |
| Dale Beck | The Valley Stream | | |
| Great Douk Cave/High Douk Cave | Damp and misty, or to bathe, to duck something | Douk is a common word in the Yorkshire Dales, examples being found in Ribblesdale and Littondale besides Chapel-le-Dale | |
| Greta | Stony stream/Rocky water | Derived from the Old Norse Griota and first mentioned in 1215 | |
| Gunnerfleet | Gunnar's River | A personal name from Old Norse | |
| Ingleborough | Fortification near Ing-Hyll, derived from Ingleton | First recorded in 1165 as Ingelburc(h) | |
| Ivescar | The scar where the ivy grows | In 1346, it was recorded as Inesker | |
| Jingling Pot | The pothole with the jingling or rattling noise | A pothole located at SD698783; spelled as Gingling Pot in older books. The j-formation is modern | |
| Skirwith | The bright headland | First mentioned in 1306 as Skyrhouth | |
| Southerscales | Sutari's Shielings | An Old Norse word which means Shoemaker | |
| Weathercote | The Shed for Wethers (castrated sheep) | First recorded in 1346. Wethercote was a bercary - a sheep farm. | |
| Winterscales | Shielings for winter use | | |
| Wisedale (Weasedale) | A meadow | | |

== Geology and geomorphology ==
Ice carved out the Yorkshire Dales in the Anglian, Wolstonian and the Devensian stages of geological history. Ice flows shaped the valley of Chapel-le-Dale by eating away at the limestone between Whernside and Ingleborough. A glacier moved south-westwards from Newby Head and Cam Fell splitting at Ribblehead, with most of the flow carving out Ribblesdale, and a smaller section carving out Chapel-le-Dale. The rock on the basement floor of the valley has no trace of fossilisation, so they were assumed to be of Precambrian age, however, carbon dating has shown them to be some 480 million years old, making them part of the Ordovician era. The scarring from the ice has left the valley as what is termed a "U-shaped valley", like other Yorkshire Dales such as Upper Wharfedale. From the uppermost scar on the north-western side of the valley to the valley bottom is a range of 100 metres (330 ft), with the valley floor at 250 metres (820 ft) AOD, to 350 metres (1,150 ft) AOD on the valley top. The breadth of the upper dale is around 0.75-mile (1.21 km).

Ingleton WTL

Either side of the valley is surrounded by limestone scars, or limestone pavements. The pavement has historically been quarried in the area (specifically Ribblesdale) for garden decoration as the 'water-worn' limestone was attractive. Philpin Sleights was quarried for its limestone pavement between 1954 and 1958, with 3,000 tonnes (3,300 tons) being extracted for rockery use in gardens. It is estimated that up to 40% of the pavement there has been lost. Scales Moor possesses some of the "finest examples of horizontal [limestone] pavements in Britain, and include some massive undissected clints." (Note: A clint is a limestone block in the limestone pavement, a gryke is a crevice between these blocks.)

At the south end of the valley, the rocks are displaced by the North and South Craven Faults. The faulting is revealed in the waterfalls that cut through the rocks showing the Great Scar Limestone at the top, a thin layer of boulder and limestone, with the slated Ordovician rocks at the bottom. Raistrick describes the wonder of being able to touch the ages by holding a hand across the layers and touching what is in effect 300 million years of geology.

The head of the dale is at the viaduct of Ribblehead, with water flowing westwards as Winterscales Beck in the upper dale, and the flow of the River Ribble flowing southwards to form Ribblesdale. Winterscales Beck drains Whernside and Blea Moor, but in times of normal flow, will disappear into the cave system below Chapel-le-Dale at Haws Gill Wheel, before re-appearing at God's Bridge, further down the valley beyond the hamlet of Chapel-le-Dale. God's Bridge is a natural limestone bridge from which the sunken Chapel Beck emerges underneath to form the River Doe (or Twiss, or Greta); it was called God's Bridge as it was not fashioned by human hands. In times of great rainfall and flood, the river does travel overground, around the chapel and emerges at God's Bridge, however, for the most part, this riverbed is dry. John Self states that the river must be a torrent, as you can "stand in the dry [river]bed and see debris in the trees several metres above." Water also enters the dale via the cave systems underneath the plateau of Scales Moor (SD719771) as Dale Barn Cave carries water from Kingsdale into Chapel-le-Dale. The western end of the dale where the two rivers meet is just before the viaduct in Ingleton. This makes the dale unusual in having a railway viaduct at either end. Also, the southern edge of the dale where it meets the edge of Ingleton is the boundary of the Yorkshire Dales National Park.

=== Quarrying and mining ===
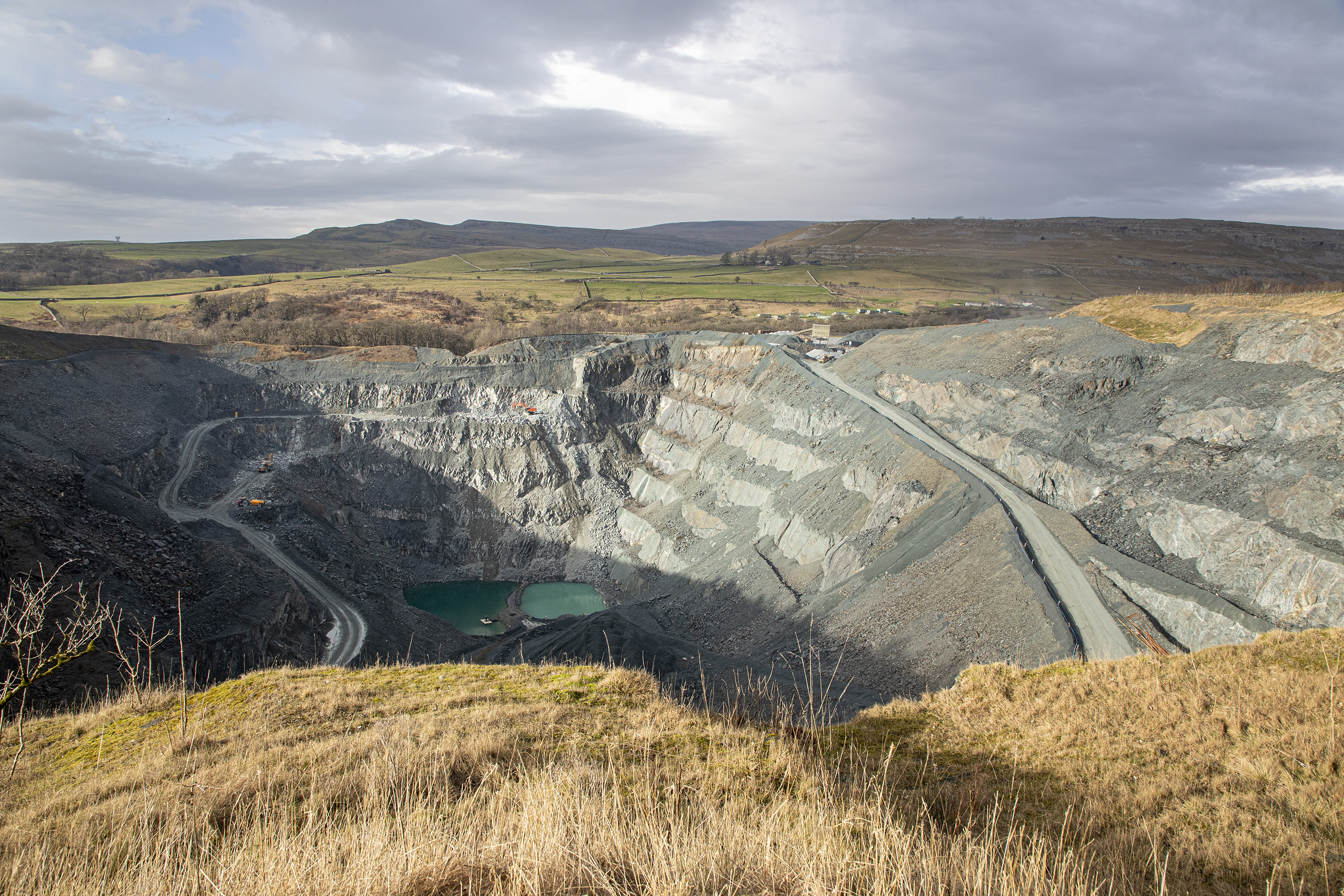
Ingleton Quarry showing the benches (ledges) on the right hand (eastern side).

The dale is mostly noted for its limestone and greywacke resources, although some coal mining was undertaken in the upper north-western part of the dale around Ivescar farm (SD748798). The only quarry left in operation is the Ingleton Quarry at SD705740, also known as Skirwith Quarry, which produces 350,000 tonnes (390,000 tons) of greywacke annually for use in surface dressing of roads. The greywacke is a "steeply folded hard sandstone that cleaves like slate..", and is dug out of a hole that extends to a depth of 130 metres (430 ft).

The previous quarry in the dale known as Ingleton Granite Quarry (SD718753) operated from 1887 to 1951 when operations were transferred to the newer Ingleton Quarry. All of the output from Ingleton Quarry leaves by road, but some is taken the short distance to the siding at Ribblehead Quarry, and moved out of the Dales by rail. The company has permission to work the quarry until 2025, when the site will be remediated with trees on the upper benches of stone, while the main quarry will be allowed to flood.

Other quarries were located further down the valley where the two rivers met - Mealbank Quarry being a notable example which had a Hoffmann Kiln, one of the earliest of this type still in existence, even though it closed in 1909. Meal Bank Quarry is designated as a scheduled monument and an SSSI due to the geology located there, which includes a layer of coal, the thickest of its kind in a British marine limestone occurrence.

== Climate ==
The dale's position on the west of the Yorkshire Dales, means it sees more rainfall than those on the far eastern side of the Yorkshire Dales National Park, with the average across the Dales being 1,500 millimetres (59 in) per year. Water flows westwards out of the Dale via the River Greta, then the River Lune to the Irish Sea. Snow can affect travel in the area in the winter, with snow frequently being blown off the cap of Ingleborough blocking the road. In August 2016, the White Scar Caves complex was closed due to extreme flooding from underground which swept through the visitor centre and poured down the steps making the B6255 road almost impassable. In 1800, John Housman travelled up Kingsdale and across Scales Moor, standing at the head of the dale, and due to its well-rained and farmed nature between the two peaks of Whernside and Ingleborough, he said that it looked like "a green strip of cloth connecting two webs of the coarseth [sic] cloth."

Rainfall in the Ingleton and Chapel-le-Dale area 1982 – 1991
| Year | Rainfall | Location | Gridref | Altitude | Notes | Ref |
|---|---|---|---|---|---|---|
| 1982 | 1,292 millimetres (50.9 in) | High Leys | SD717721 | 296 metres (971 ft) | | |
| 1983 | 1,362 millimetres (53.6 in) | White Scar Caves | SD713745 | 251 metres (823 ft) | | |
| 1984 | 1,299 millimetres (51.1 in) | White Scar Caves | SD713745 | 251 metres (823 ft) | | |
| 1985 | 1,475 millimetres (58.1 in) | White Scar Caves/Low Scales | SD713745 SD735775 | 251–314 metres (823–1,030 ft) | January to October recorded at White Scar, November and December from Low Scales | |
| 1986 | 1,959 millimetres (77.1 in) | Ellerbeck | SD729785 | 366 metres (1,201 ft) | | |
| 1987 | 1,870 millimetres (74 in) | Ellerbeck | SD729785 | 366 metres (1,201 ft) | | |
| 1988 | 1,950 millimetres (77 in) | Ellerbeck | SD729785 | 366 metres (1,201 ft) | | |
| 1989 | 1,540 millimetres (61 in) | Ellerbeck | SD729785 | 366 metres (1,201 ft) | | |
| 1990 | 1,858 millimetres (73.1 in) | Ellerbeck | SD729785 | 366 metres (1,201 ft) | | |
| 1991 | 1,870 millimetres (74 in) | Low Scales | SD735775 | 314 metres (1,030 ft) | | |

== Settlements and governance ==
The only notable settlement is the hamlet of Chapel-le-Dale which is 4 miles (6.4 km) north-east of Ingleton, and 240 metres (800 ft) above sea level. Farms exist on the upper northern side of the dale at Broadrake, Bruntscar, Gunner Fleet, Ivescar, and Winterscales. There was a village at Southerscales on the northern flank of Ingleborough, but this has been recorded as a deserted medieval village. The population of the dale in 1879 was given as 1,125, and after the 2011 Census, it was estimated to be 108. St Leonards Church in the hamlet of Chapel-le-Dale was built in the late 17th century as a chapel of ease to the church in Ingleton. The actual date of its founding is uncertain, however a reader is mentioned in the parish records for Ingleton Fells (an early name for the Chapel-le-Dale area) in 1666. In 1864, it was granted its own ecclesiastical parish. The chapel is now a grade II listed structure.

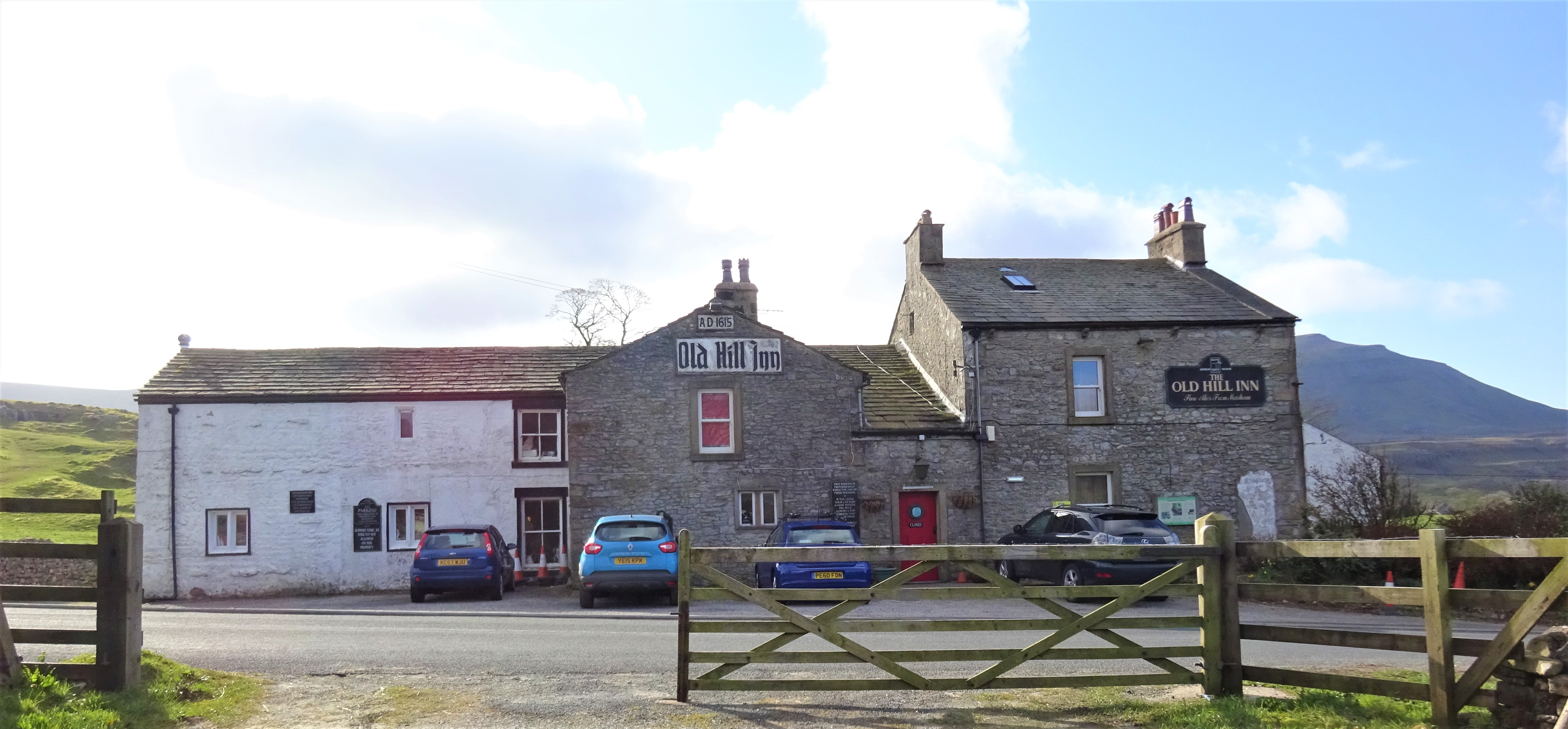
The Old Hill Inn

The entire valley is part of the Ingleton Civil Parish, and part of the Skipton and Ripon Constituency. Historically the valley was in the wapentake of Ewecross, which was in the West Riding of Yorkshire. From 1888 the valley came under the Settle Rural District until 1974 when the areas of Craven were moved into North Yorkshire.

There is one public house in the dale, the Old Hill Inn which was originally a drinking house for drovers. The inn dates back to 1615 and claims Winston Churchill as a former client.

== Tourist attractions ==
Ingleborough and surrounding area geology showing caves and potholes. Not all locations are shown.

The biggest attraction within the dale is the White Scar Caves complex, the longest show cave in Britain. The cave system at White Scar extends for 6,000 metres (20,000 ft), but was only accessible to the public for the first 400 metres (1,300 ft) which has a path and lighting. Since 1991, access to the Battlefield cavern has been provided (which is 1.5 kilometres (0.93 mi)) in, by a team of Cornish tin miners who blasted away the rock. Also popular, at the southern end of the dale is the Ingleton Waterfalls Trail, which has several waterfalls on both the Kingsdale Beck and the river flowing down Chapel-le-Dale.

The presence of so many caves and waterfalls in the dale led to Harry Speight labelling it as one of the "wonders of Yorkshire". Skirwith Cave near to Ingleton was open as publicly-accessible cave between 1965 and 1974. It was closed due to the dangers of a rock collapse. Similarly, access to Weathercote Cave is restricted after the death of a caver in 1971. Weathercote Cave is notable for being one of the places sketched by J. M. W. Turner in his travels across the area in 1820. In 1987, cavers were blamed for leaving a coffin on the path between the Old Hill Inn and Great Douk Cave. There was no body inside the coffin, but it did contain an Indian takeaway meal, reams of computer tape and "a large number of Co-Op stamps..". After other finds, including a litter bin and a model dinosaur wedged down potholes, the landlord of the Old Hill Inn blamed the caving community.

== Wildlife and designations ==
The cave system underneath the valley floor has been extensively studied for bat populations. Great Douk Cave, Meregill Hole and Gatekirk cave were all subject to assessment for at least five species of bat. However, the dale of Upper Wharfedale between Kettlewell and Yockenthwaite were favoured by the bats over Chapel-le-Dale, which is thought to be down to the greater insect densities, and also low water noise which would not be too detrimental to the bats' echo-location. The abundance of water in Chapel-le-Dale has seen several bird species attracted, including dipper and grey wagtail. Woodland covers some of the glens around the Waterfalls walk in the south, whilst the middle part of the dale has very limited tree cover. However, the upper dale has extensive tree cover.

The quarry area around Skirwith is known to be a location for peregrine falcons and great-crested newts. The SSSI to the west of the Ingleton Quarry has a very rare species of moss - Thamnobryum cataractarum, known as Yorkshire Feather-moss. The moss was discovered in 1991 along the River Doe on the west side of Ingleton Quarry, and is listed as endangered on the British Species List as it is only known to exist in this one location. The river system is known for its brown trout in the middle of the dale, and for its trout, sea trout and salmon in the Ingleton Glens area.

There are several protected areas with designations within the valley: Southerscales, which is part of the Ingleborough Nature Reserve, is also an SSSI, and an SAC - it is also protected by a Limestone Pavement Order (LPO). The entire valley is part of the Yorkshire Dales National Park, with large swathes of the fells of Ingleborough and Scales Moor being access land as part of the CRoW act.

== Notable people ==
- Sir Robert Geoffrey Edwards, physiologist, and IVF specialist was evacuated to the dale during the Second World War
