= Weathercote Cave =

Cave in North Yorkshire, England

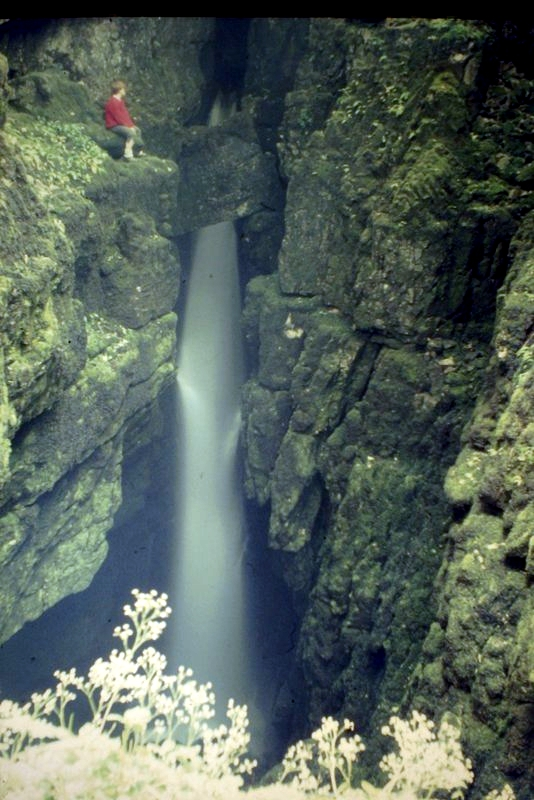

- Location within Yorkshire Dales
- Location: Chapel-le-Dale, North Yorkshire, [UK]
- OS grid: SD 7393 7756
- Coordinates: 54°11′36″N 2°24′04″W
- Depth: 33 metres (108 ft)
- Length: 762 metres (2,500 ft)
- Elevation: 262 metres (860 ft)
- Geology: Carboniferous limestone
- Entrances: 1
- Difficulty: III
- Hazards: water, loose boulders, verticality
- Access: By prior arrangement

Weathercote Cave is a natural solutional cave in Chapel-le-Dale, North Yorkshire, England. It has been renowned as a natural curiosity since the eighteenth century, and was accessible to paying visitors until 1971. The entrance is a large shaft about 20 metres (66 ft) deep, dominated by a waterfall entering at one end. It lies within the designated Ingleborough Site of Special Scientific Interest.

== Description ==
The entrance lies in the floor of the Chapel-le-Dale valley below the Hill Inn, and is enclosed by a substantial wall. A path leads from a doorway in the wall to the open shaft, some 61 metres (200 ft) long and up to 15 metres (49 ft) wide. The underground Winterscales Beck emerges from a passage at the north end, and falls some 20 metres (66 ft) down the shaft. The top of the waterfall is overhung by a massive wedged boulder known as Mohammed's Coffin. The name is an allusion to the legend that through the use of magnets or lodestones, Mohammed's coffin was suspended in mid-air in his tomb in Mecca.

At the near end of the shaft, a flight of 51 steps descends beneath a natural rock arch, to the bottom, where a number of short passage all lead to sumps, the main one of which has been connected to Jingle Pot, another daylight shaft located 140 metres (460 ft) down the valley, and thence to Hurtle Pot, a further 200 metres (660 ft) down the valley. The total length of explored passages in the combined system is 2,370 metres (7,780 ft), and the total depth is 64 metres (210 ft). The water can be followed upstream of the waterfall through a series of low aqueous passages and small chambers. When the beck is in full spate, the shaft can fill to the top, and overflow down the valley.

== Geology and hydrology ==
Weathercote Cave is a solutional cave formed in Visean Great Scar limestone from the Mississippian Series of the Carboniferous period, and is part of the underground watercourse of Winterscales Beck. Winterscales Beck sinks at Haws Gill Wheel, about 1,000 metres (3,300 ft) upstream of Weathercote Cave, and flows through a shallow and largely flooded cave system. When the river reached a major cross joint at Weathercote, it descended to base level. The roof has since collapsed to form the surface shaft. The underground stream flows through the base of two other surface shafts, Jingle Pot and Hurtle Pot, before resurging at God's Bridge, 1,300 metres (4,300 ft) down the valley. The connection between two of the caves was confirmed in 1770, when a bonnet lost by a woman in Weathercote Cave was later retrieved from Hurtle Pot.

== History ==
Weathercote Cave was first described in detail by Richard Pococke who undertook a tour of Yorkshire in 1751. He said that it was "one of the most extraordinary and surprizing scenes I have ever beheld". It was drawn to the public's attention in 1780 by John Hutton in an appendix to Thomas West's "A Guide to the Lakes", who described it as "the most surprising natural curiosity in the island of Great Britain". Thereafter, it became a destination for those seeking the picturesque, and is featured in most later guide books of the area. J. M. W. Turner visited the cave in 1808, and made a number of sketches and painted a view from the bottom, and in 1816 he returned when he painted the view from the top when the river was in spate. In 1818, William Westall produced a book of aquatinted engraved views of Yorkshire which included five views of Weathercote Cave. In 1835, Wordsworth described it as a "fine object". By 1858 at the latest, tourists were paying for the privilege of visiting the site, and in 1875 John Ruskin described it as "the rottenest — deadliest— loveliest — horriblest place I ever saw in my life". The cost of entry at this time was 1s per person. In 1971, John Fellows, a visiting caver, died after being struck by a falling rock, and since then access has been restricted. The underwater connection with Jingle Pot was made in April 1986 by members of the Cave Diving Group.
