= Great Douk Cave =

Cave in North Yorkshire, England

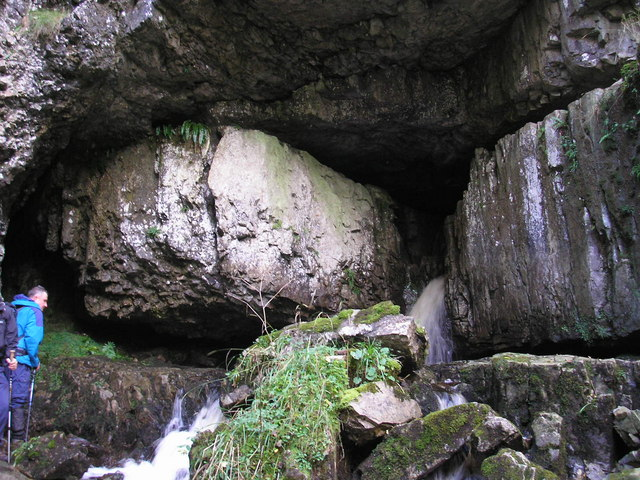
- Entrance to Great Douk Cave

- Location within Yorkshire Dales
- Location: Chapel-le-Dale, Ingleborough
- Coordinates: 54°11′18″N 2°23′20″W
- Length: 914 metres (2,999 ft)
- Discovery: first through trip 1936
- Geology: Carboniferous limestone
- Entrances: 5 (excluding Southerscales Pot)
- Difficulty: Easy - no pitches or difficulties
- Hazards: Flooding
- Access: No restrictions

Great Douk Cave is a shallow cave system lying beneath the limestone bench of Ingleborough in Chapel-le-Dale, North Yorkshire, England. It is popular with beginners and escorted groups, as it offers straightforward caving, and it is possible to follow the cave from where a stream emerges at a small waterfall to a second entrance close to where it sinks 600 yards (549 m) further up the hill. It lies within the Ingleborough Site of Special Scientific Interest.

== Description ==
The main entrance is in a large collapsed depression, at the bottom of which is the scaffolded entrance to Great Douk Pot, and at the south-eastern end is the obvious entrance to the cave from which a waterfall issues.

The cave can be entered by climbing up the waterfall, or crawling through an open bedding above. To the left, a low passage leads to where the Southerscales Pot stream flows out of a short sump. Straight on is easy walking, passing under Little Douk Pot, an alternative pothole entrance, and 70 metres (230 ft) beyond beneath another skylight to the surface. Eventually a pleasant succession of cascades is met, and the passage passes through areas of fine flowstone. Soon after an oxbow passage, which by-passes a low crawl in the stream, the passage bifurcates.

The main way is to the left, which lowers to a flat-out bedding with the main water entering from a small passage on the left. Straight ahead the passage chokes, but a hole in the roof enters a dry bedding which leads to a junction. Turning left leads to the Middle Washfold entrances.

== History ==
Great Douk must have been known for a very long time, but the first reference to it may be found in John Hutton's Addendum to the second edition of Thomas West's Guide to the Lakes published in 1780. Hutton and party explored the cave for some 50 yards (46 m) beyond the Little Douk Pot window. Thereafter a visit to the entrance at least, seems to have been on every passing tourist's schedule, featuring, for example, in the 1853 edition of Garnett's Craven Itinerary.

In 1850, Howson in his guidebook to Craven reported that it was possible to penetrate beyond Little Douk for "about seven hundred yards", and the Balderstons in Ingleton: Bygone and Present published in 1888 described how the cave can be explored to where "the subterranean river is found to have its branches like a subaerial stream" – i.e. to within a 100 yards (91 m) of the exit at Middle Washfold. The connection with Middle Washfold was made on 1 August 1936 by Norman Thornber and E. J. Douglas of the British Speleological Association and F. King of the Northern Cavern and Fell Club. The connection with Middle Washfold Sink was made by members of the University of Leeds Speleological Society (ULSA) in February 1966.

The connection with Southerscales Pot was made in 1966 by members of the Cave Diving Group following the exploration of Southerscales Pot by ULSA. In 2021 Great Douk gained a fifth entrance when a surface shakehole collapsed into the stream passage below.

== Etymology ==
Douk features a number of times in the names of caves and locations in the Yorkshire Dales, including Low Douk on Ireby Fell, Douk Gill Cave near Horton in Ribblesdale, Dowkabottom Cave in Littondale, and High Douk Cave near Great Douk Cave. One meaning of the term offered by Smith in his 1961 The Place-Names of the West Riding of Yorkshire, with reference to Dowkabottom, is "damp, wet, mist", but William Carr in an 1828 book on the dialect of Craven gives the meaning as "To bathe, to duck".

The first known publication in which the cave was referred to as 'Great Douk Cave', as opposed to 'Douk Cave' as in earlier publications, was Harry Speight's 1892 The Craven and North-West Yorkshire Highlands, although William Stott Banks refers to "great and little Douk" in his 1866 Walks in Yorkshire.

== Gallery ==
The bottom waterfall entrance

Squeezing past flowstone in the main stream passage

Low passage close to the connection with Middle Washfold Cave

One of the Middle Washfold entrances
