= White Scar Caves =

Show cave in North Yorkshire, England

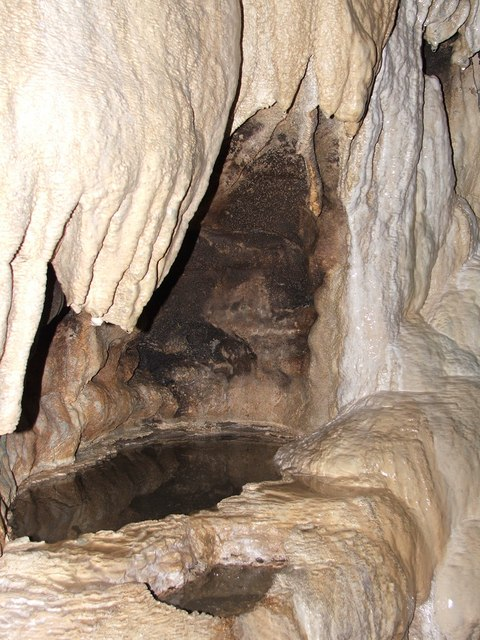
- Formations in the show cave

- Location within Yorkshire Dales
- Location: Chapel-le-Dale, North Yorkshire, England
- OS grid: SD 7128 7452
- Coordinates: 54°09′56″N 2°26′29″W
- Length: 6.5 kilometres (4.0 mi)
- Elevation: 259 metres (850 ft)
- Discovery: 1923
- Geology: Carboniferous limestone
- Entrances: 2
- Hazards: Water
- Access: Show cave
- Show cave opened: Opened 1925
- Show cave length: 1,600 metres (1,700 yd)
- Cave survey: cavemaps.org
- Website: www.whitescarcave.co.uk

White Scar Caves is a show cave in the civil parish of Ingleton, North Yorkshire, England, under Ingleborough in the Chapel-le-Dale valley of the Yorkshire Dales National Park. It is a solutional resurgence cave formed in Carboniferous limestone, some 6 kilometres (3.7 mi) long.

It was first explored in August 1923 by two amateur geologists, Christopher Long and J.H. Churchill, but there have been further discoveries since then, including "The Battlefield", one of the largest known cave chambers in Great Britain at 90 metres (300 ft) long. Originally accessed through a vertical boulder choke, an access tunnel has been cut to include it on the visitor trail.

The system is open as a show cave. The entrance is from the Ribblehead to Ingleton road on the west of Ingleborough; tours are run throughout the year. The visitor facilities include a shop and café.
