= Ribblehead Quarry =

Former quarry in North Yorkshire, England

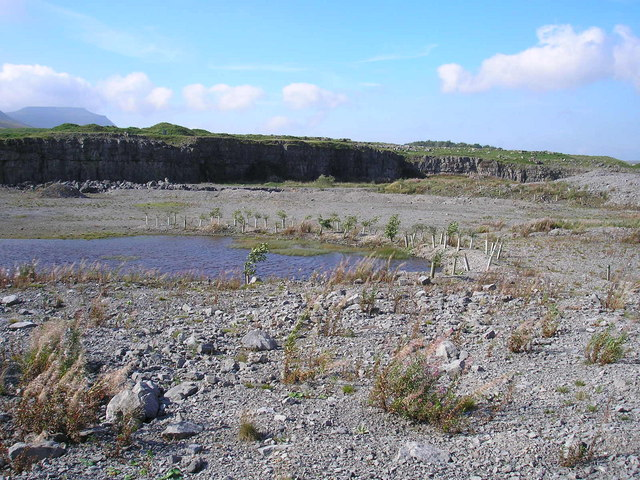
- The site of Ribblehead Quarry

- The location of Ribblehead Quarry
- Location: Ribblehead, North Yorkshire, England; 54.203°N 2.358°W
- Products: Railway ballast Limestone
- Production: 210,000 tonnes (230,000 tons)
- Financial year: 1976
- Type: Quarry
- Closed: 1998; 28 years ago

Ribblehead Quarry is a former limestone quarry next to Ribblehead railway station in the Yorkshire Dales National Park, North Yorkshire, England. It had a connection to the Settle–Carlisle line, with most of its products being sent out via the railway.

== History ==
The quarry was in existence by the end of the 19th century, largely as a stone resource for the building of the Settle to Carlisle railway. Later, the Craven Lime Company who owned it, allowed quarrying operations to lapse around 1907. Despite being located near to Ribblehead railway station, the quarry was not located near to a population centre, and getting workers to travel to the quarry was difficult. Originally, the stone won from the quarry was used in building the adjacent railway line, but in the early twentieth century, the stone was used in North East England for iron and steel production, along with being an additive in toothpaste and household cleaners. In 1943, the quarry was reopened to operations, producing agricultural limestone. A north connected siding was provided for the quarrying operations run by H. Austin in 1945, which later (in 1974) involved the removal of the down platform on the railway line (for trains northwards serving Carlisle). In 1973, Amey Roadstone Company (ARC) bought the quarry to replace quarrying operations at its Middlebarrow Quarry near to Silverdale (now Cumbria) which was nearing the end of its quarrying licence.

Between 1976 and 1986, the quarry produced 210,000 tonnes (230,000 tons) of railway ballast every year. This was sent out via rail over the Settle & Carlisle Line. In an effort to combat the effects of acid rain caused by pollution, limestone would have been added to power station gas-flues, absorbing the sulphur. This early initiative in the 1980s would have seen the quarry producing up to 1,200,000 tonnes (1,300,000 tons) of limestone per year.

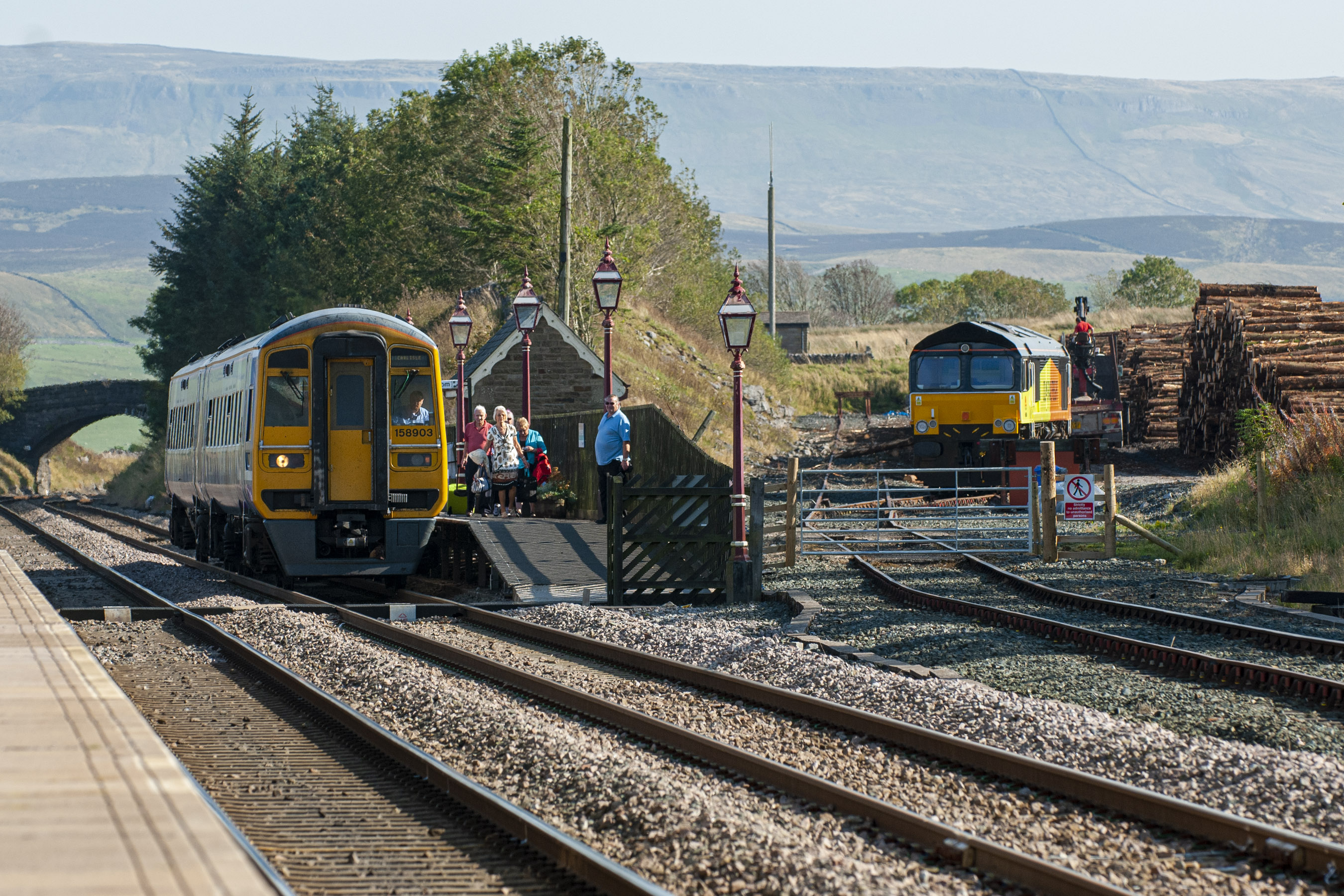
Looking south at Ribblehead - the former quarry siding is on the right

In 1998, ARC announced it would cease quarrying completely at the site, leaving behind possible reserves of 2,300,000 tonnes (2,500,000 tons) of limestone and limestone pavement. In 2000, the former Ribblehead Quarry site became part of the Ingleborough National Nature Reserve. The company that owned the quarry (Hanson) turned the site over to English Nature in October 2000, in the expectation that it would reach peak re-wilding status by 2040. A stone bench known as the Geology Seat has been constructed inside the quarry, which is on a path linking Ribblehead with Selside. Visitors are encouraged to sit down to listen to an audio recording describing the geology, wildlife and history of the area.

The siding for the quarry has since been re-used to forward timber out from a culling programme on Cam Fell, and also again to forward stone, this time quarried from nearby Ingleton, but transported in by road before rail transport.

== Nature reserve ==
The quarry bottom is host to what has been described as the "nationally scarce" birds eye primrose. Birds that have been observed at the site include oystercatcher, raven, redshank, and ringed plover.
