= Newby Head =

Upland pass in Yorkshire, England

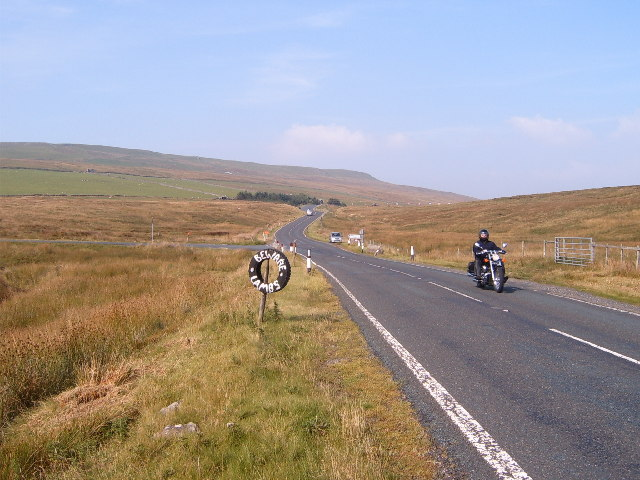
- The B6255 at Newby Head Moss

- Location within North Yorkshire
- Elevation: 1,439 feet (439 m)

Third Approach
- Coordinates: 54.2514°N 2.3168°W

Newby Head, Newby Head Farm or Newby Head Inn is part of the Beresford Estate and was a popular drovers' inn in North Yorkshire, England. Now a farmhouse, it stands at the top of Newby Head Pass on the B6255 road between Ingleton and Hawes. Newby Head is around 1,439 feet (439 m) above sea level.

== Drover's Inn ==
The name of the area derives from a combination of Old English (niwe) and Old Norse (by), meaning the new building. The land around the head was historically owned by Furness Abbey, and the buildings at Newby Head were a drovers' inn until 1919. There was plenty of custom from the drovers bringing sheep and cattle to and from Scotland. The land around Newby Head is mostly glacial till over limestone and has one of the sources of the River Ribble bubbling out of it. Newby Head Inn was an alternative to the renowned drovers inn and weekly market at Gearstones selling meat, flour, animals and vegetables just 2 miles (3 km) down the road.

Winters are very harsh in the Yorkshire Dales. In the past winters the RAF was drafted in to drop hay and food supplies for the farmers and animals. There are also signs of now-abandoned settlements around Newby Head.

The inn at Newby Head was a drovers' inn and roadside inn for travellers on the Richmond to Lancaster Turnpike road. There drovers, packmen and other travellers called in for a drink and to stay the night. The lodgings were basic and not only were rooms shared, but beds were shared as well as was often the custom of the past centuries. In January 1843, an inquest was held at Newby Head Inn by the Skipton coroner Thomas Brown. Isaac Mason, a carpenter who had stayed at the inn on his way back to Dent from Hawes, had been found dead in bed. According to the person with whom he had shared the bed, Mason had become ill overnight and the second man went downstairs to get a candle for light. When he returned he found Isaac Mason dead. The verdict was death by the 'visitation of God'.

The inn stood at 1,425 feet (434 m) above sea level; the second highest in England at the time (after Tan Hill Inn, which is still open). Thomas Guy was innkeeper in 1821. Edmund Thistlethwaite was landlord in 1841 and by 1851 John Swinbank had taken over. In 1905 the landlord changed from Christopher Swinback to Simeon Parker. The Swinbanks had been at Newby Head at least since 1851 when John Swinbank was 'victualler and farmer' with 170 acres (69 ha) of land. It was one of the outlying inns which the magistrates were keen to close around the turn of the century mainly because it was too far out from the towns to supervise and they saw no real need for it. It was always a farm and after its closure as an inn in 1919 it returned to full-time farming.

== Newby Head Pass ==
Newby Head Pass is an upland pass situated on the top section of the B6255 between Hawes and Ingleton, North Yorkshire in England. Newby Head Pass was named after the Drovers Inn at Newby Head at the top of the Pass. Newby Head Pass stands at an altitude of 1,439 feet (439 m) above sea level and was formerly the border between the North and West Ridings of Yorkshire. After it was moved into North Yorkshire in 1974, it formed the border between the districts of Craven and Richmondshire.

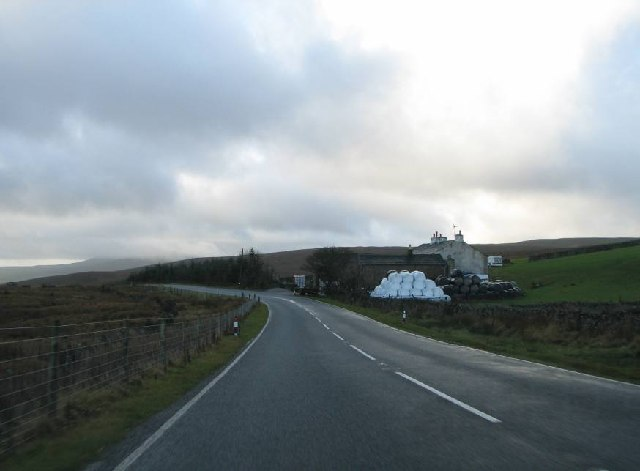
Newby Head Farm
