= God's Bridge =

Natural limestone bridge in County Durham, England

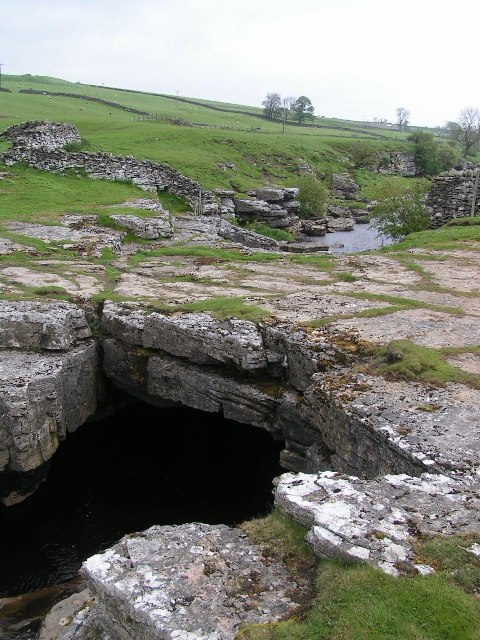
- The Pennine Way crossing the River Greta at God's Bridge

- Location within County Durham
- Location: MAGiC MaP
- Nearest town: Barnard Castle
- Coordinates: 54°30′33″N 2°4′2″W
- Area: 9.3 ha (23 acres)
- Established: 1986
- Governing body: Natural England
- Website: God's Bridge SSSI

God's Bridge is a Site of Special Scientific Interest in the County Durham district of south-west County Durham, England. It is a natural limestone bridge over the River Greta, just over 3 km upstream from the village of Bowes.

The bridge was formed by a process of cave development in the limestone beneath the river bed and is the best example in Britain of a natural bridge formed in this way. The SSSI covers a portion of the river above and below the bridge where shallow cave development by solutional activity is still taking place.

The Pennine Way crosses the River Greta at God's Bridge.

== Yorkshire Dales ==
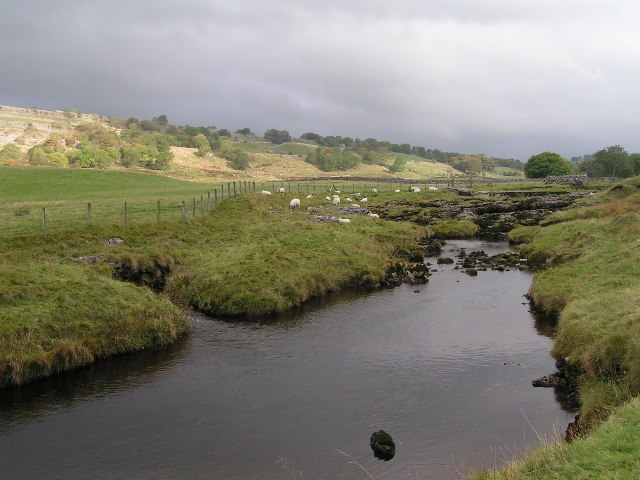

A similar formation on the River Doe near Chapel-le-Dale in the Yorkshire Dales has the same name.
