= Whernside =

Mountain in the Yorkshire Dales, England

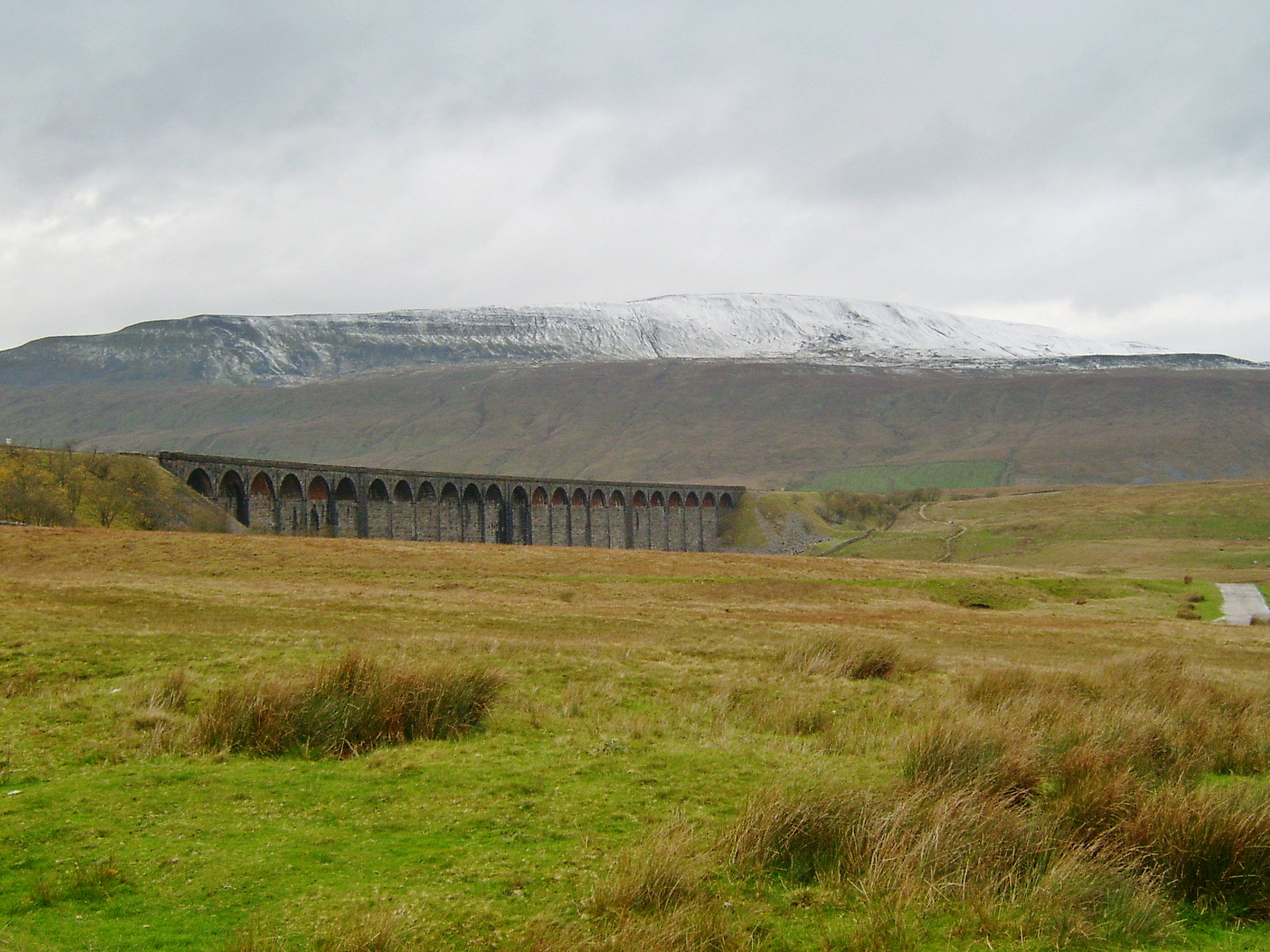
- A snow-covered Whernside and Ribblehead; Viaduct seen from Ribblehead

Highest point
- Elevation: 736 m (2,415 ft)
- Prominence: 408 m (1,339 ft)
- Parent peak: Cross Fell
- Listing: Marilyn, Hewitt, Hardy, County Top, Nuttall
- Coordinates: 54°13′40″N 2°24′12″W

Geography
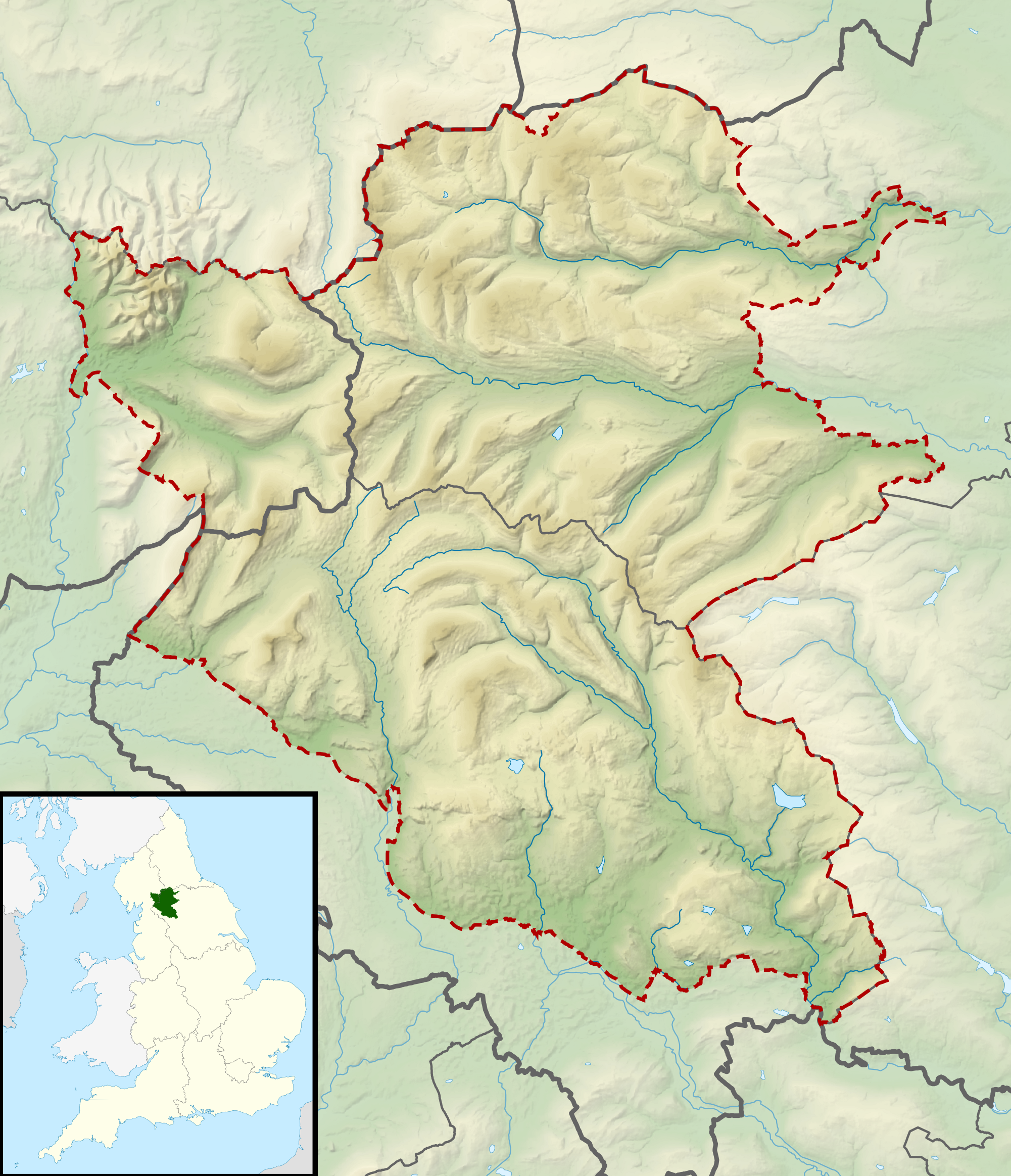
- Location within Yorkshire Dales
- Location: Yorkshire Dales, England
- OS grid: SD738814
- Topo map: OS Landranger 98

Whernside is a mountain in the Yorkshire Dales in Northern England. It is the highest of the Yorkshire Three Peaks, the other two being Ingleborough and Pen-y-ghent. It is the highest point in the ceremonial county of North Yorkshire (Note: Mickle Fell in southern Teesdale is the highest point within the boundaries of the historic county of Yorkshire.) and the historic West Riding of Yorkshire with the summit lying on the county boundary with Cumbria. It is the fifteenth most prominent hill in England.

In shape Whernside forms a long ridge, running roughly north-north-east to south-south-west. The mountain is 6 miles (10 km) north west of Ingleton and 6 miles (10 km) north of Horton-in-Ribblesdale.

== Name ==
The name, first recorded in 1208 as Querneside, is of Old English origin. It is derived from cweorn 'quern' or 'millstone' and sīde 'hillside', so means "hillside where millstones are found". The name is of the same origin as Great Whernside, 17 miles (27 km) to the east, with which it is sometimes confused.

== Routes ==
Whernside lies about two miles (three kilometres) northwest of Ribblehead Viaduct on the Settle–Carlisle Railway, and the mountain is commonly ascended from Ribblehead. There is a public footpath from Ribblehead that heads north via Smithy Hill and Grain Ings before turning west to Knoutberry Haw and then south to Whernside itself. From the summit the right of way heads initially south, then steeply south-east down a stepped path to the area known as Bruntscar. If climbed as part of the Yorkshire Three Peaks Challenge (which is normally done anti-clockwise) Whernside is climbed following the route up from Ribblehead to descend to Bruntscar.

There are, however, other routes up/down the mountain which are not rights of way but instead make use of open access land. A path heads directly west from the triangulation pillar to reach Deepdale Lane near White Shaw Moss. An alternative route heads directly north across Knoutberry Haw to pass Whernside Tarns and reaches the Craven Way at Boot of the Wold. Following the southern descent for 3/4 mile (1.2 kilometres), instead of turning steeply south-east towards Bruntscar a path continues south-west running adjacent to the wall passing Combe Scar and West Fell to reach the limestone pavements at Ewe's Top.

Finally, 275 yards (250 m) south of the triangulation pillar an old route (partly fenced off) descends (initially very steeply) for 1 1/4 miles (2 kilometres) to reach a road 275 yards (250 m) southwest of Winterscales Farm, this is the old route of the Three Peaks Challenge. Walkers should select this route with care as it is no longer maintained, boggy, badly eroded and requires extreme care over the steep ascent/descent. The current route of the Three Peaks fell race runs approximately 440 yards (400 m) north of this old ascent along open moor.

A walk solely around Whernside starting at the junction of the Blea Moor and Gauber roads near the Station Inn at Ribblehead, to the top of Whernside and back via the bridleway from Bruntscar via the farms at Broadrake, Ivescar, Winterscales and Gunnerfleet (or the footpath from Blea Moor Sidings) is a distance of roughly 8 1/2 miles (13.5 km).

Alfred Wainwright in his 1970 Walks in Limestone Country describes three walks titled "Ascent of Whernside": a 14 1/4-mile (23-kilometre) route from Ingleton, up the southwest ridge and returning via Ellerbeck, which he describes as "an exhilarating walk, a tonic for jaded minds, and a splendid exercise for the legs"; a 10 1/2-mile (17 km) route from Dent (alternatively, 7 1/2 miles or 12 kilometres from a car parked nearer), following what is now the Dales High Way route onto the ridge and descending steeply west to Deepdale, "a fine walk on a fine day with excellent views ... the best of all routes up Whernside because of the lovely countryside from which it springs"; and the 7 1/2-mile (12 km) ascent from Ribblehead, via Force Gill with a direct return via Winterscales.

On a clear day the views from the summit to the west can be spectacular, with views of the Lake District and Morecambe Bay, including (with the aid of binoculars) Blackpool Tower, some 40 miles (65 km) away.
