= Yorkshire Dales =

Upland area of the Pennines in Northern England

Coordinates: 54°16′N 2°05′W

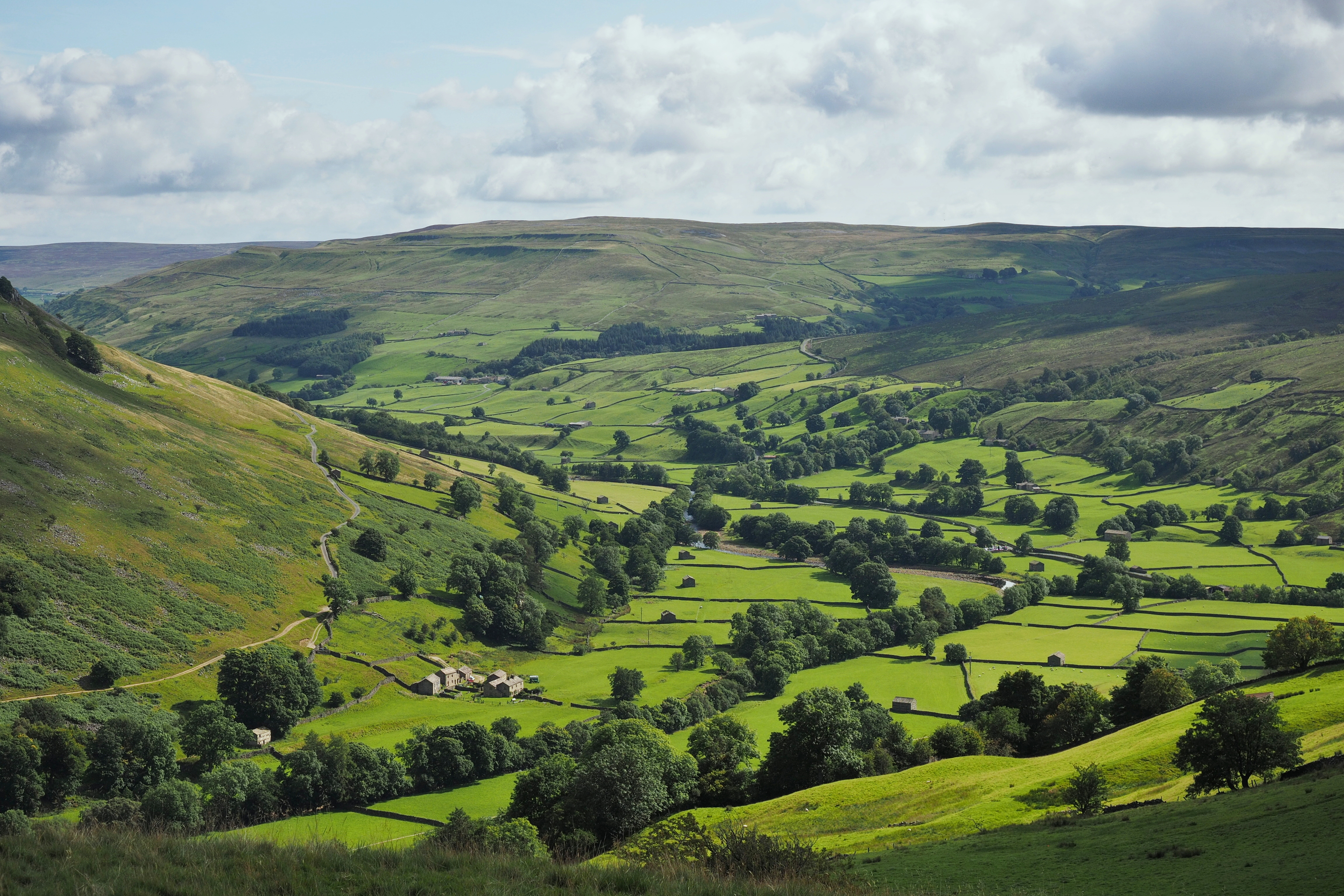
Swaledale

The Yorkshire Dales are a series of valleys, or dales, in the Pennines, an upland range in England. They are mostly located in the ceremonial county of North Yorkshire, but extend into Cumbria and Lancashire; they are entirely within the historic boundaries of Yorkshire. The majority of the dales are within the Yorkshire Dales National Park, created in 1954. The exception is the area around Nidderdale, which forms the separate Nidderdale National Landscape.

The landscape of the Yorkshire Dales consists of sheltered glacial valleys separated by exposed moorland. The predominant rock is Carboniferous Limestone, which is particularly visible in the south-west in features such as Malham Cove. It is overlain in many areas by the Yoredale Series of alternating weak shales and hard limestones and sandstones, which give the dales their characteristic 'stepped' appearance. Most of the dales contain rivers, and the area contains seven primary catchments: the Swale, Ure, Wharfe, Aire, Nidd, Ribble, and Lune. There are several notable cave systems in the area, including part of the longest system in the United Kingdom, the Three Counties.

Agriculture and other land management has significantly affected the appearance of the Dales, through the creation of pastures and meadows for livestock grazing and moorland for red grouse shooting. Dry stone walls and field barns are characteristic of the valley floors, particularly Wensleydale and Swaledale in the north. Wensleydale cheese is a particularly famous product from the region. The dales are popular for hiking, and are crossed by the Dales Way, Pennine Way, and Coast to Coast long-distance footpaths. The Yorkshire Three Peaks is a walking trail entirely within the area which takes in three of its mountains: Ingleborough (723 m (2,372 ft)), Whernside (736 m (2,415 ft)), and Pen-y-ghent (694 m (2,277 ft)). The extensive cave systems are a major centre for caving in the UK.

== Etymology ==
The word dale, like dell, is derived from the Old English word dæl. It has cognates in the Nordic/Germanic words for valley (dal, tal), and occurs in valley names across Yorkshire and Northern England. Usage here may have been reinforced by Nordic languages during the time of the Danelaw.

Most of the dales are named after their river or stream (e.g., Arkengarthdale, formed by Arkle Beck). The best-known exception is Wensleydale, which is named after the small village and former market town of Wensley, rather than the River Ure, although an older name for the dale is Yoredale. River valleys all over Yorkshire are called "(name of river)+dale"—but only the more northern valleys (and only the upper, rural, reaches) are included in the term "The Dales".

== Geography ==
The Yorkshire Dales are surrounded by the North Pennines and Orton Fells in the north, the Vales of York and Mowbray in the east, the South Pennines in the south, and the Lake District and Howgill Fells to the west. They spread to the north from the market and spa towns of Settle, Skipton, and Harrogate in North Yorkshire, to the southern boundary in Wharfedale and Airedale. Natural England define the area as most of the Yorkshire Dales National Park with fringes of the Nidderdale AONB, but without the towns listed above apart from Settle.

The lower reaches of Airedale and Wharfedale are not usually included in the area, and Calderdale, south of Airedale and in the South Pennines, is not often considered part of the Dales (even though it is a dale, is in Yorkshire, and its upper reaches are as scenic and rural as many further north). Additionally, although the National Park includes the Howgill Fells and Orton Fells, they are not usually considered part of the Dales.

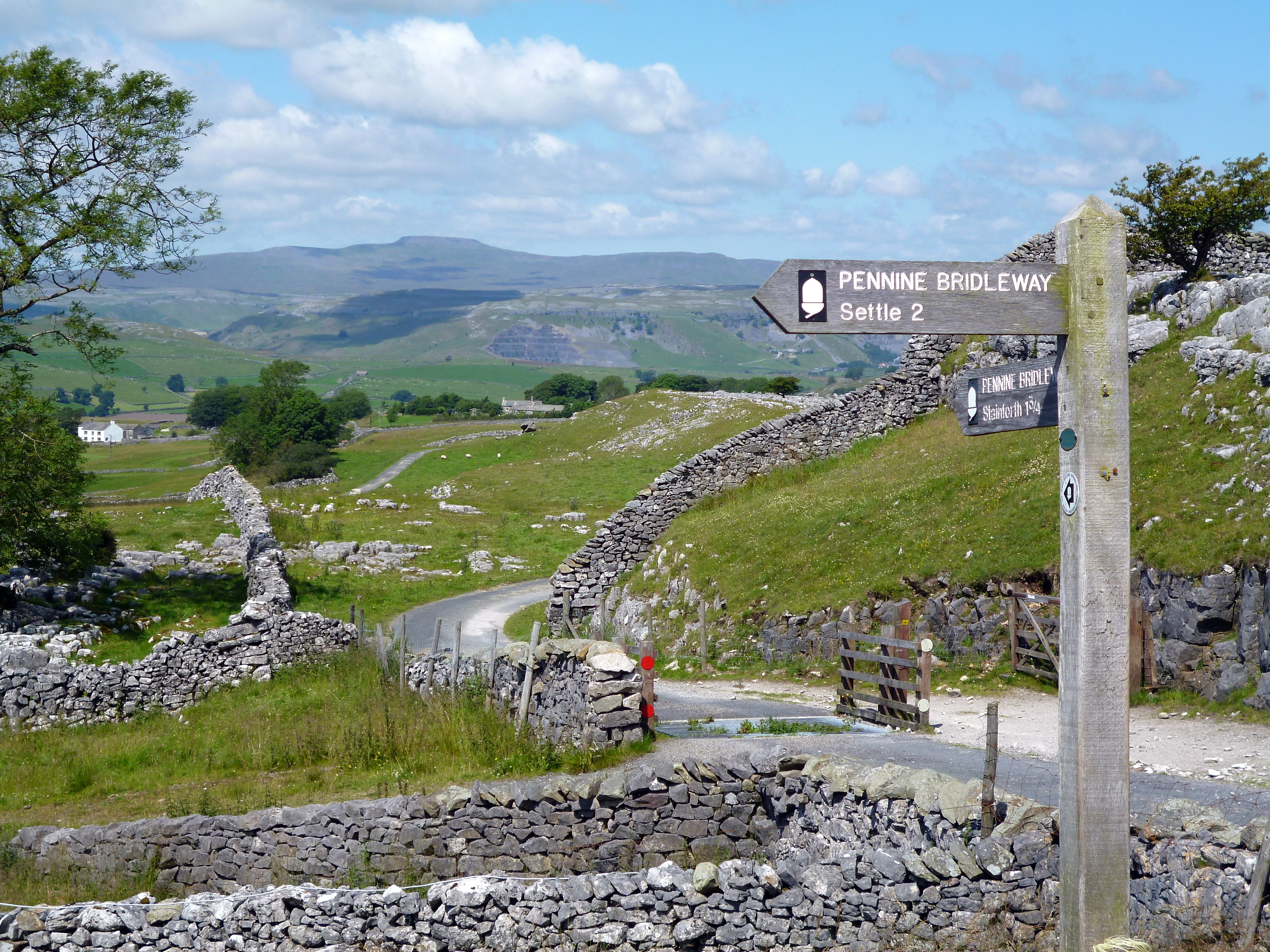
A view near Malham, on the Pennine Bridleway

Most of the larger southern dales – Ribblesdale, Malhamdale and Airedale, Wharfedale and Nidderdale – run roughly parallel from north to south. The more northerly dales – Wensleydale and Swaledale – run generally from west to east. There are many other smaller or lesser-known dales such as Arkengarthdale, Bishopdale, Clapdale, Coverdale, Kingsdale, Littondale, Langstrothdale, Raydale Waldendale and the Washburn Valley whose tributary streams and rivers feed into the larger valleys, and Barbondale, Dentdale, Deepdale and Garsdale which feed west to the River Lune.

The characteristic scenery of the Dales is green upland pastures separated by dry-stone walls and grazed by sheep and cattle. A survey carried out in 1988 estimated that there were just over 4,971 miles (8,000 km) of dry-stone walling in the Yorkshire Dales. Many upland areas consist of heather moorland, used for grouse shooting from 12 August (the Glorious Twelfth).

== Protected areas ==
The Yorkshire Dales National Park covers 2,178 km^{2} (841 sq mi) and includes most of the dales as well as the Howgill Fells, and the Orton Fells. Most of the park is within North Yorkshire, with a sizeable area in Cumbria and a small part in Lancashire. Nidderdale is not within the national park, and has instead been designated a national landscape.

== Cultural aspects ==
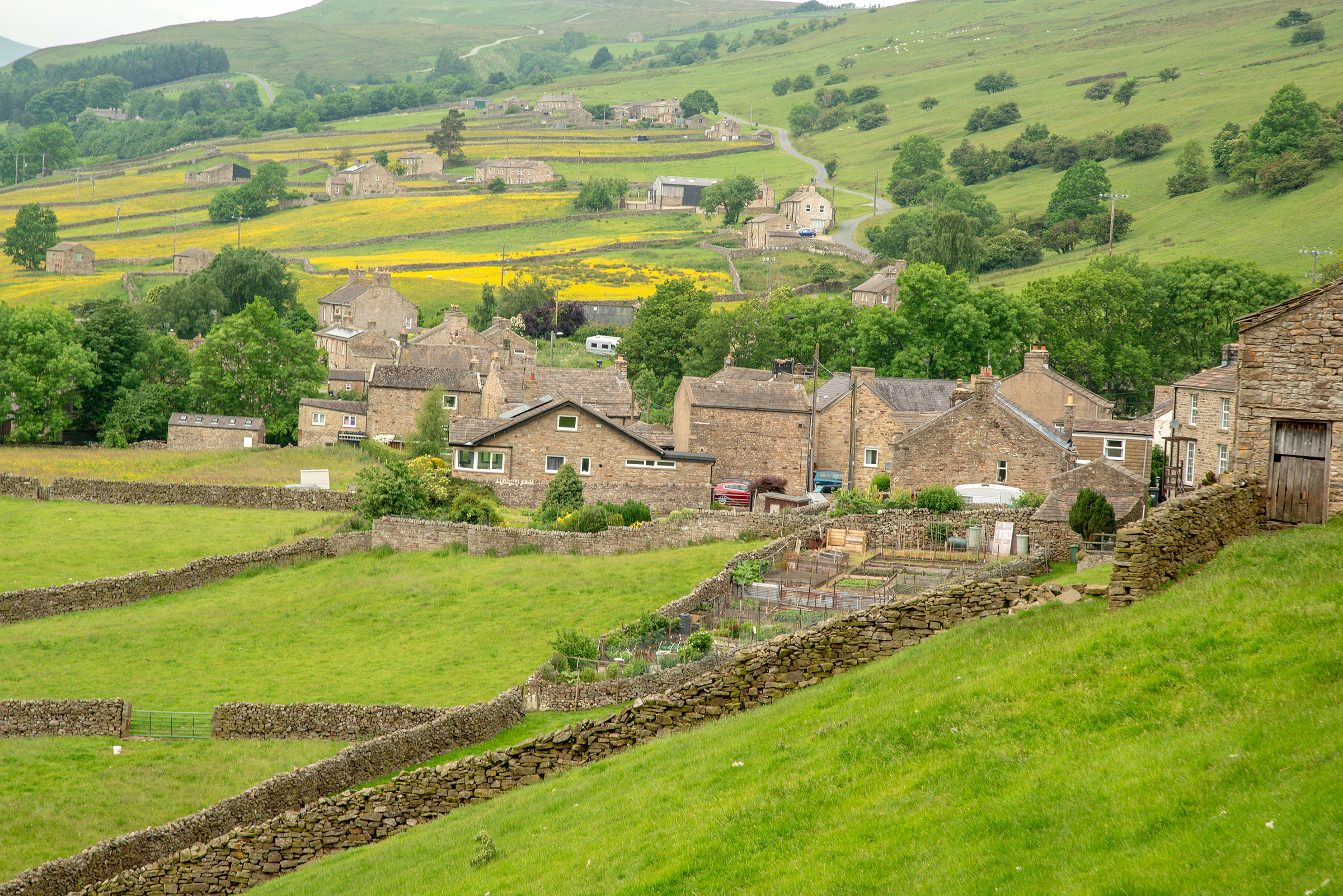
A typical village (Gunnerside) in the Swaledale agricultural area of the Yorkshire Dales

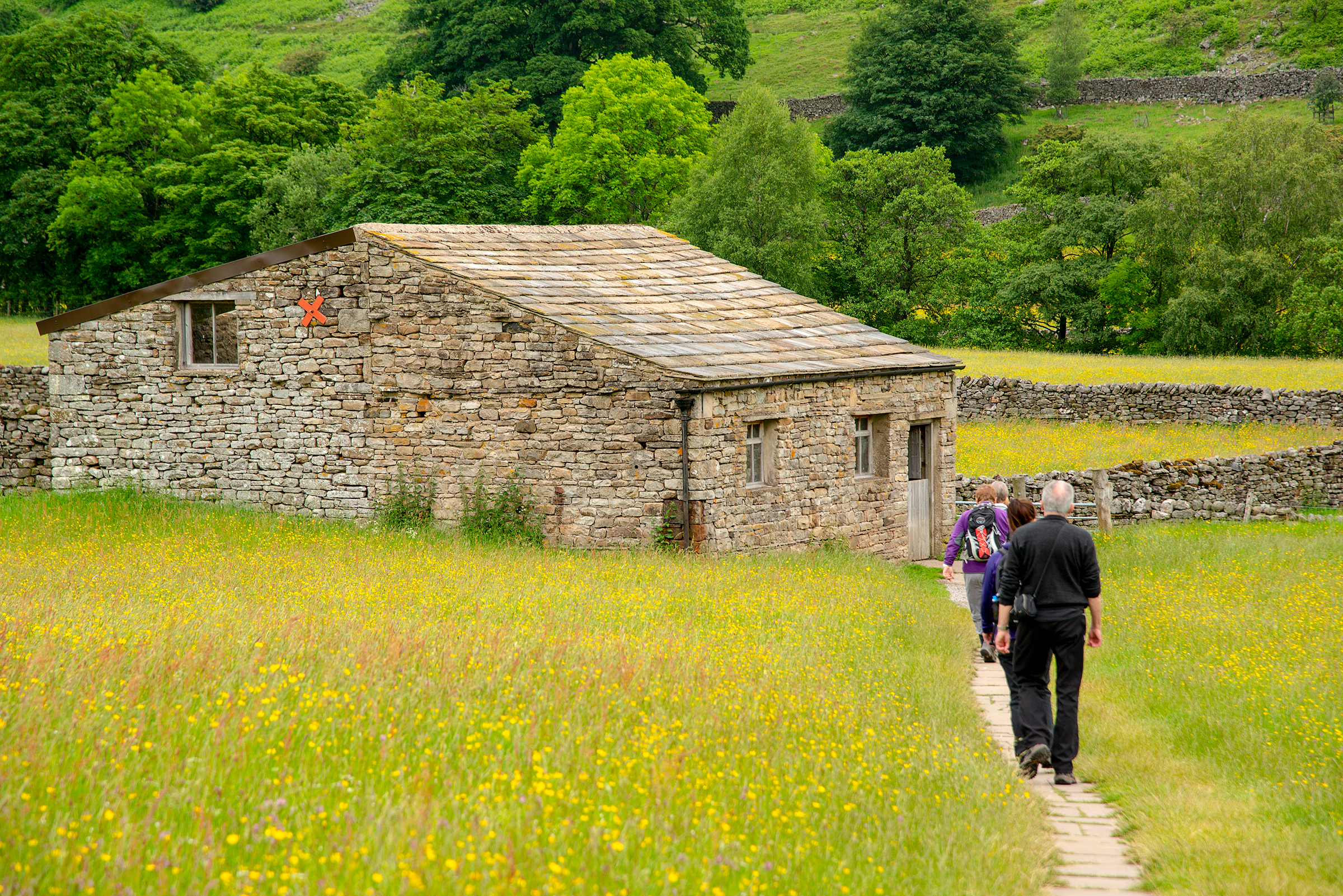
Tourists approaching a field barn in Muker

Much of the rural area is used for agriculture, with residents living in small villages and hamlets or in farmsteads. Miles of dry-stone walls and much of the traditional architecture have remained, including some field barns, though many are no longer in active use. Breeding of sheep and rearing of cattle remain common. To supplement their incomes, many farmers have diversified, with some providing accommodations for tourists. A number of agricultural shows are held each year.

Lead mining was common in some areas of the Dales in the 19th century, particularly during 1821 to 1861, and some industrial remains can still be found, such as the Grassington miners' cottages. Certain former mining sites are maintained by Historic England. The Grassington Moor Lead Mining Trail, with its many remaining structures, has received funding from a variety of sources. The Yorkshire Dales National Park Authority provides a mobile-device software app for those who wish to explore the relevant areas.

== Tourism ==
In this primarily agricultural area, tourism has become an important contributor to the economy. In 2016, there were 3.8 million visits to the Yorkshire Dales National Park including 0.48 million who stayed at least one night. The park authority estimates that this contributed £252 million to the economy and provided 3,583 full-time equivalent jobs. The wider Yorkshire Dales area received 9.7 million visitors who contributed £644 million to the economy.

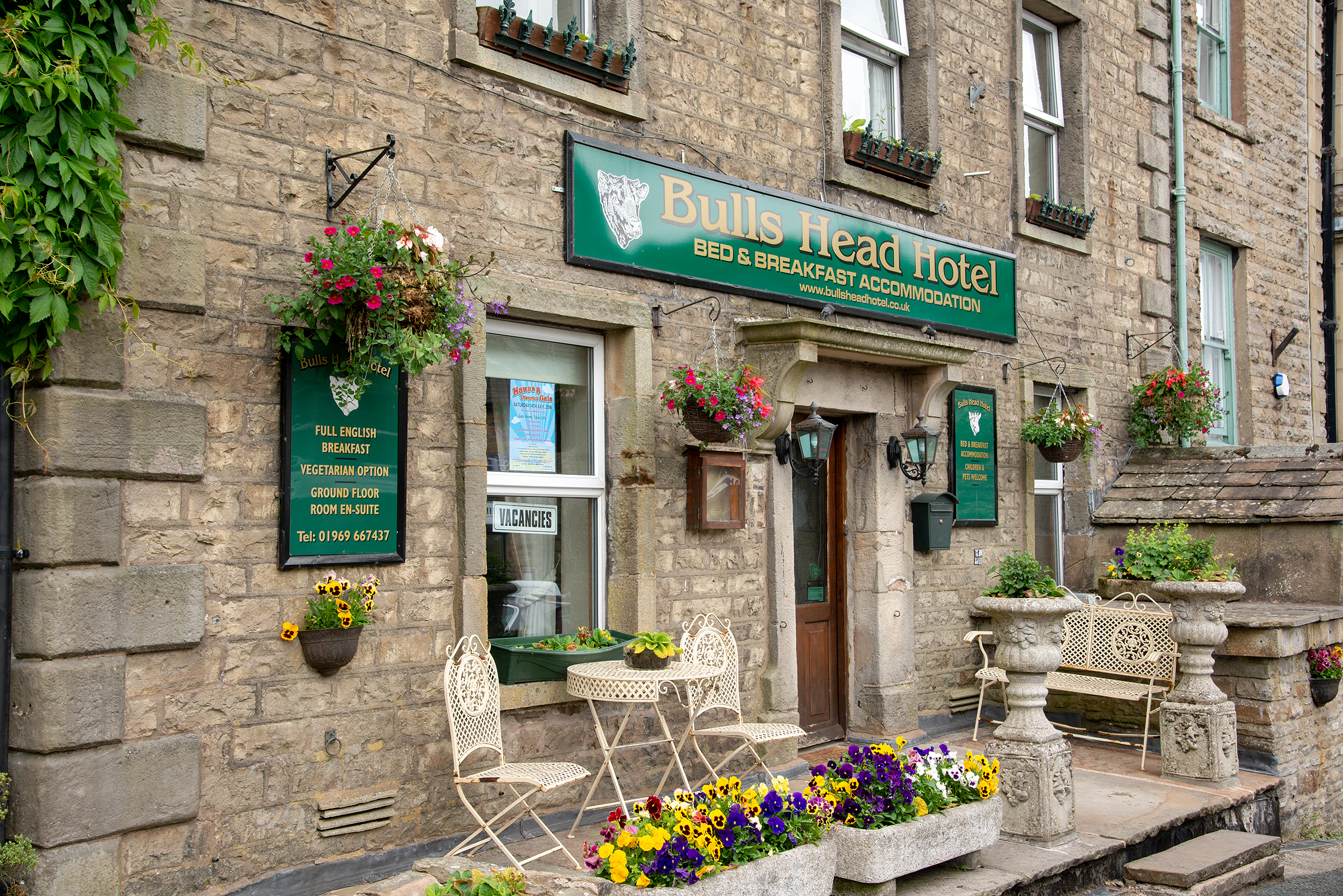
A traditional pub with rooms to let in Hawes, in the Dales of North Yorkshire

Visitors are often attracted by the hiking trails, including some that lead to waterfalls and picturesque villages and small towns. These include Kirkby Lonsdale (just outside the area), Hawes, Appletreewick, Masham, Clapham, Long Preston and Malham.

The 73-mile-long (117 km) Settle–Carlisle line railway, operated by Network Rail, runs through the National Park using tunnels and viaducts, including Ribblehead.

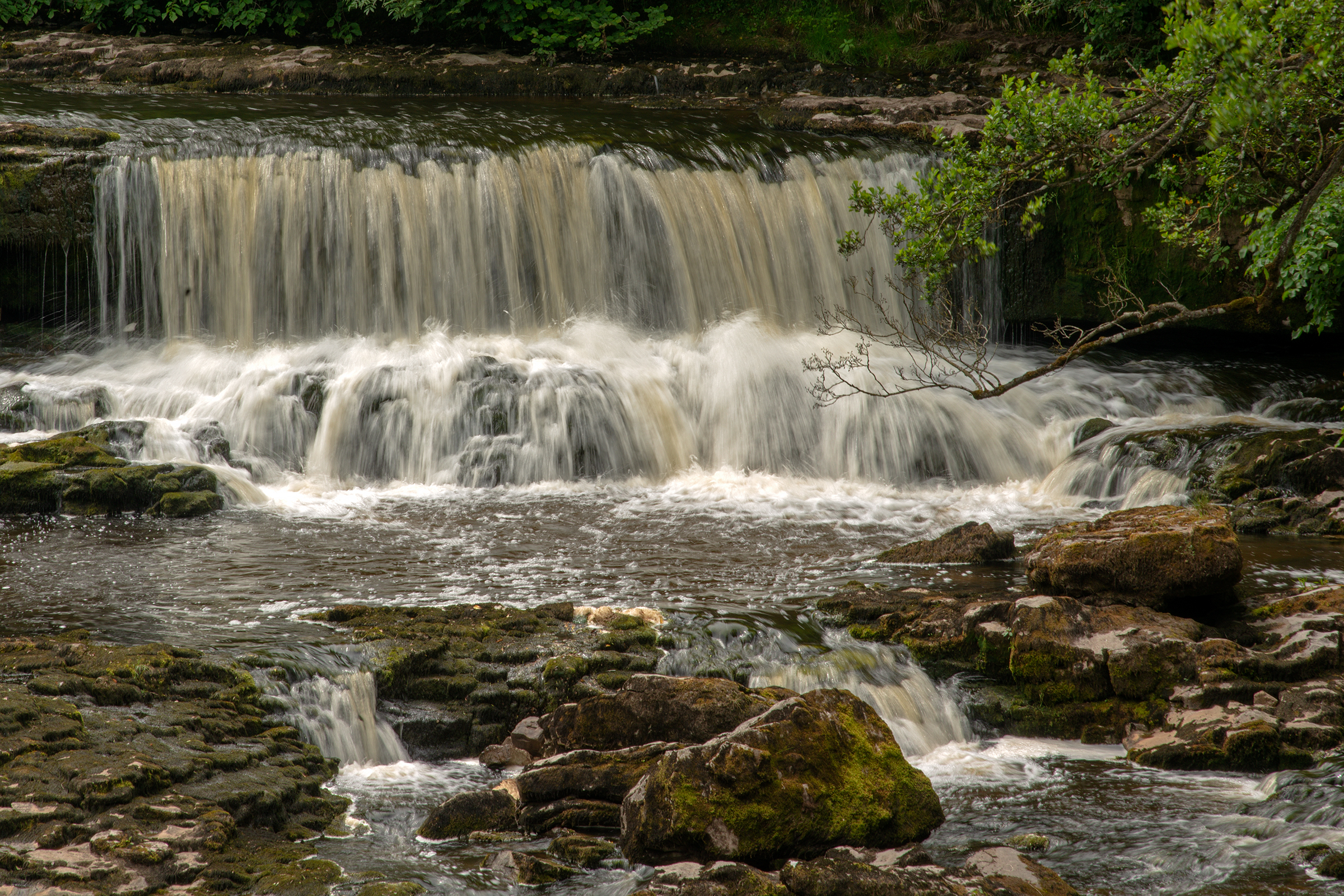
A small section of Aysgarth Falls

The top-rated attractions according to travellers using the Trip Advisor site include Aysgarth Falls, Malham Cove (scenic walking areas), Ingleborough (hiking trails) and Ribblehead Viaduct.

The DalesBus service provides service in the Dales on certain days in summer, "including the Yorkshire Dales National Park and Nidderdale Area of Outstanding Natural Beauty". In summer, these buses supplement the other services operating year-round in the Dales.

Tourism in the region declined because of restrictions implemented in relation to the COVID-19 pandemic in 2020, and into 2021. Later in 2021, the volume of visits was expected to increase as a result of the 2020 TV series All Creatures Great and Small, largely filmed within the Dales. The first series aired in the UK in September 2020 and in the US in early 2021. One source stated that visits to Yorkshire websites had increased significantly by late September 2020. By early 2021, the Discover England websites, for example, were using the tagline "Discover 'All Creatures Great and Small' in Yorkshire".

== Geology ==
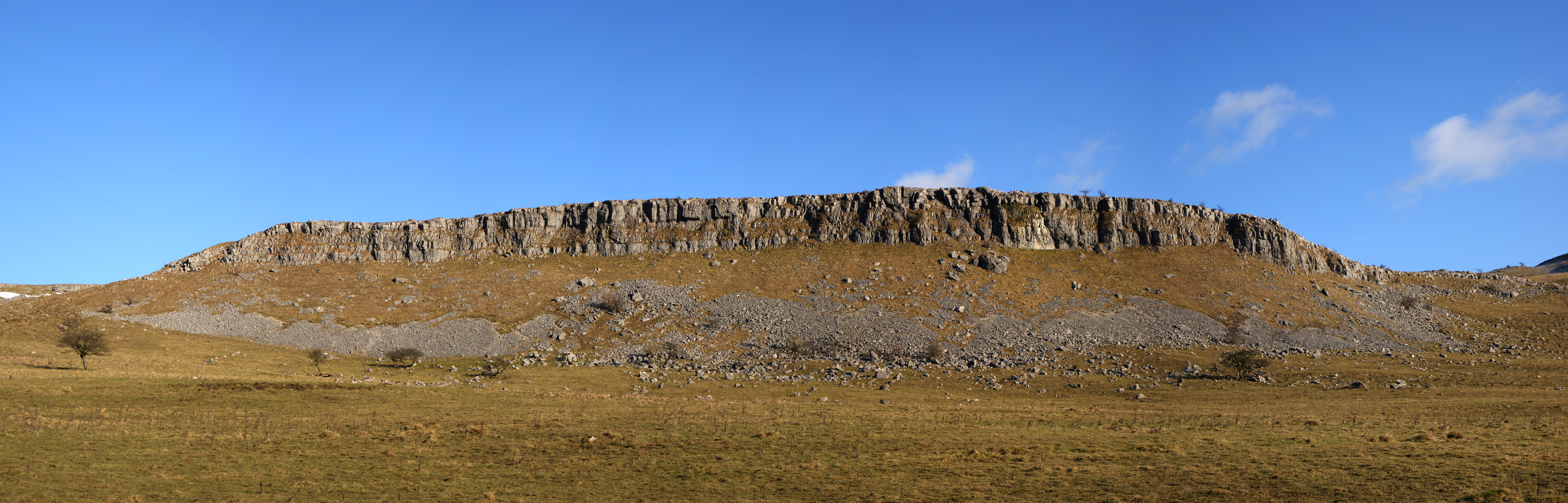
Cliffs of Carboniferous Limestone are a common geological feature in the Yorkshire Dales; this panoramic image shows the western face of Thwaites Scars taken from Long Lane.

The dales are U- and V-shaped valleys, the former enlarged and shaped by glaciers, mainly in the most recent Devensian ice age. The underlying rock is mainly Carboniferous Limestone, which results in a large areas of karst topography, in places overlain with shale and sandstone and topped with Millstone Grit, although to the north and west of the Dent Fault the hills are formed from older Silurian and Ordovician rocks.

== Cave systems ==
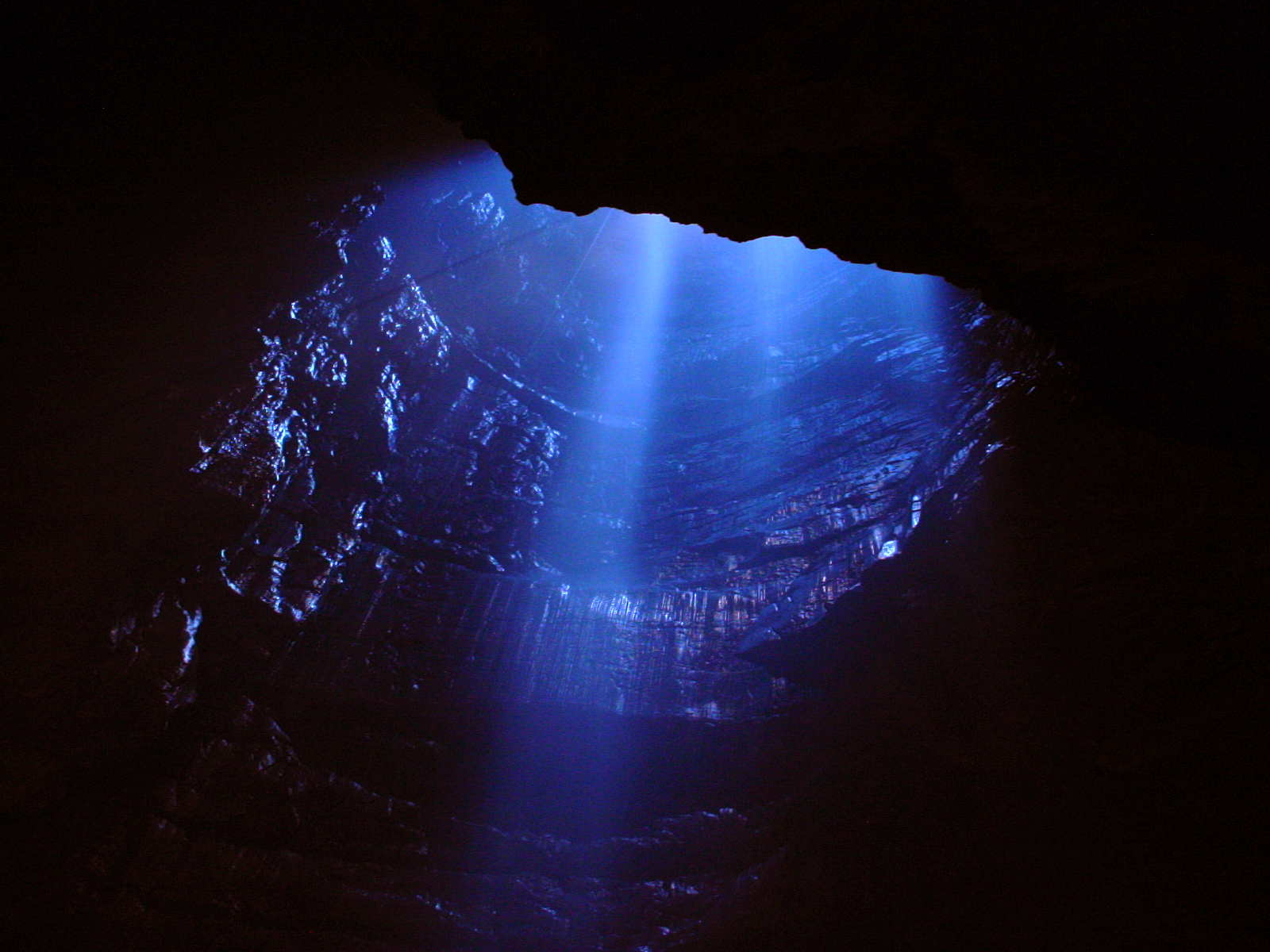
Gaping Gill

The underlying limestone in parts of the Dales has extensive cave systems, including the 54-mile-long (87 km) Three Counties System, making it a major area for caving in the UK. There are over 2500 known caves; some are open to the public for tours. Visitors can try caving at one of the show caves: White Scar Cave, Ingleborough Cave or Stump Cross Caverns near Greenhow.

The systems include:

- Gaping Gill System
- Alum Pot System
- Mossdale Caverns
- Leck Fell Caves
- Easegill System
- White Scar Caves in Chapel-le-Dale near Ingleton
- Ingleborough Cave in Clapdale near Clapham
- Stump Cross Caverns near Pateley Bridge
- Goyden System near Pateley Bridge

== Gallery ==
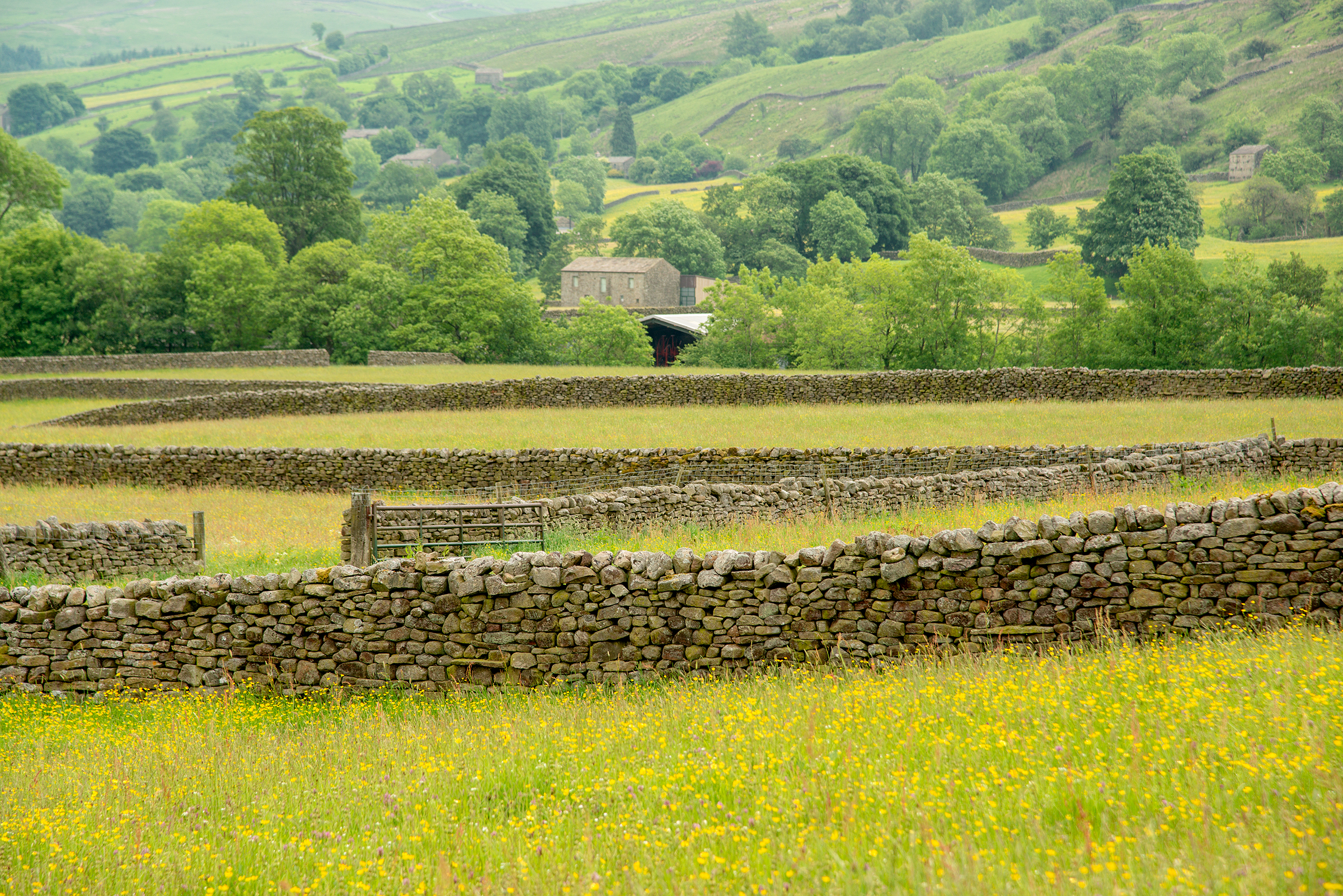
Dry stone walls in the Yorkshire Dales

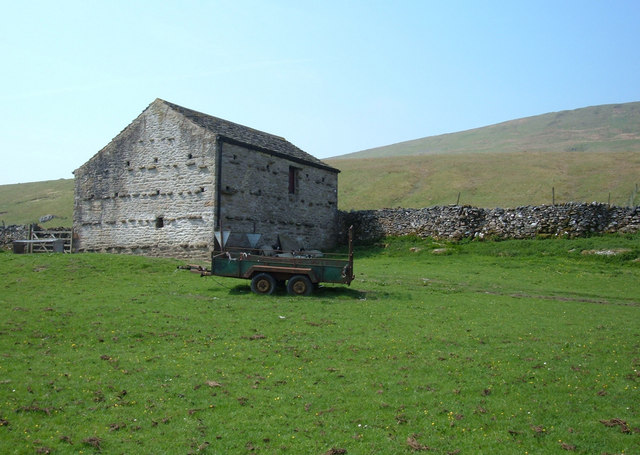
Typical Dales barn, near Selside

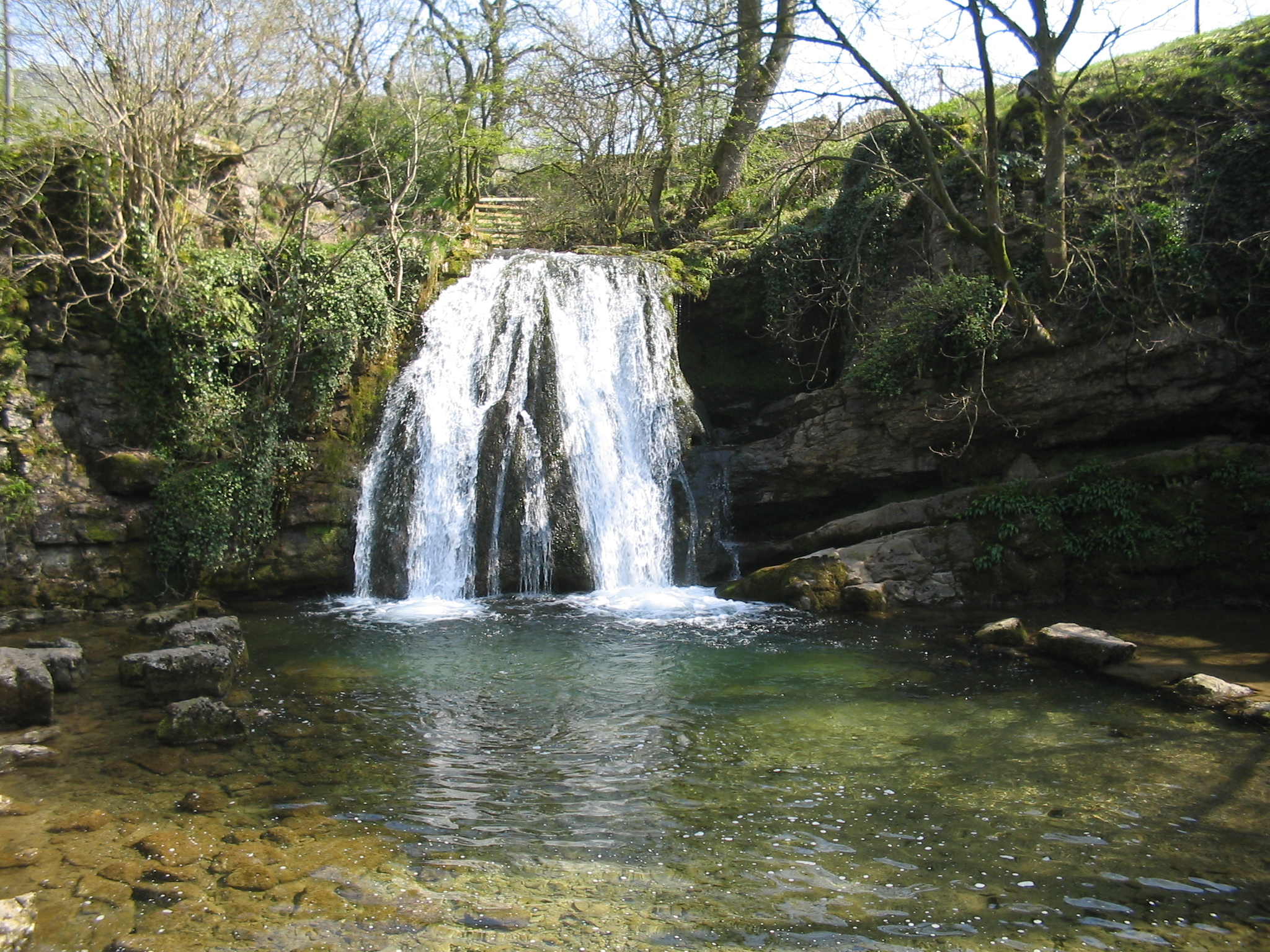
Janet's Foss, near Malham

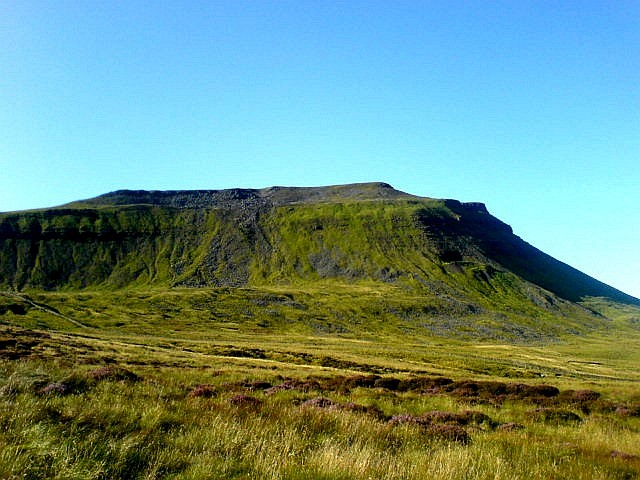
Ingleborough as seen from the peat bog below

== See also ==
- List of peaks in the Yorkshire Dales
- All Creatures Great and Small
- Emmerdale
- Yorkshire Culture
