= Ingleton, North Yorkshire =

Village and civil parish in North Yorkshire, England

Coordinates: 54°09′05″N 2°28′09″W

Ingleton
- Village
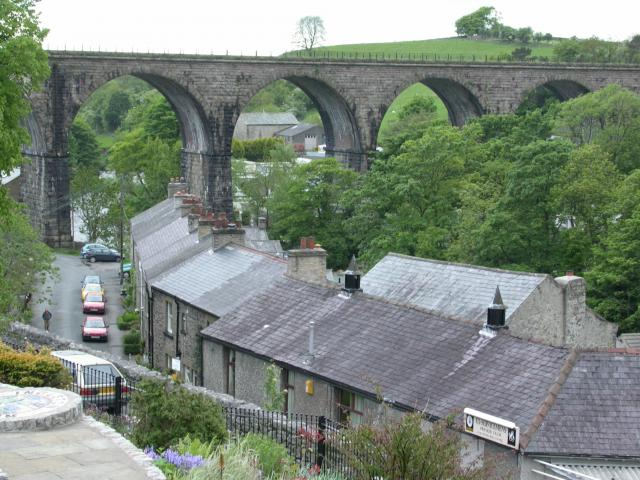
- Ingleton and the viaduct

- Location within North Yorkshire
- Population: 2,186 (2011 census)
- OS grid reference: SD691729
  - London: 205 mi (330 km) SE
- Civil parish: Ingleton
- Unitary authority: North Yorkshire
- Ceremonial county: North Yorkshire
- Region: Yorkshire and the Humber
- Country: England
- Sovereign state: United Kingdom
- Post town: CARNFORTH
- Postcode district: LA6
- Dialling code: 015242
- Police: North Yorkshire
- Fire: North Yorkshire
- Ambulance: Yorkshire
- UK Parliament: Skipton and Ripon

Ingleton is a village and civil parish in North Yorkshire, England. The village is 17 miles (27 km) from Kendal and 17 miles (27 km) from Lancaster on the western side of the Pennines. It is 9 miles (14 km) from Settle. The River Doe and the River Twiss meet to form the source of the River Greta, a tributary of the River Lune. The village is on the A65 road and at the head of the A687. The B6255 takes the south bank of the River Doe to Ribblehead and Hawes. The village once had two railway stations, but the main visible reminder of the railway is the landmark Ingleton Viaduct. Arthur Conan Doyle was a regular visitor to the area and was married locally, as his mother lived at Masongill from 1882 to 1917 (see notable people). It has been claimed that there is evidence that the inspiration for the name Sherlock Holmes came from here.

Whernside, 6 miles (9.7 km) north-north-east of the village, one of the Yorkshire Three Peaks, is the highest point in the parish at 736 metres (2,415 ft).

There are major quarries within the parish. Ingleton Quarry is active; Meal Bank Quarry no longer is, but extracted Carboniferous limestone and possesses an early Hoffman kiln. There was a textile mill, and the coalfield supported twelve or more small collieries, but Ingleton is mostly known for its tourism, being partially in the Yorkshire Dales National Park, offering waterfalls in a SSSI, limestone caves and karst landscape walking opportunities.

== History ==
Ingleton and the surrounding area was settled in the Iron Age by the Brigantes, who built a hill fort on top of Ingleborough with walls 0.6 miles (1 km) in circumference. It is thought that the Romans defeated the Brigantes in battle and built a fort alongside the hill fort. The valley was crossed by Roman roads as Ingleton was a strategic river crossing. By the 12th century the Normans had built a church in the village.

The name Ingleton derives from the Old English ingeltūn meaning 'settlement by a peak'.

=== Manor ===
Willian Lowther (1574–1641) of Ingleton Hall was Lord of the manor, Justice of the Peace for the West Riding and had seven children. His son Richard (1602–1645) inherited the manor and two sons joined the church. His daughter Frances (1612–1665) married John Walker who leased the Ingleton Colleries, and Elizabeth (1615–?) married Anthony Bouch on 23 January 1633 and mortgaged Ingleton Manor.

Richard Lowther (Collonell [sic], governor of Pontefract) and his son Gerrard were on the losing Royalist side at the Civil War siege of Pontefract Castle in 1645, and later at Newark. The war ended and his father dead, Gerrard was fined by the new government for his delinquency, and entered into a series of agreements to pay the debt and court appearances to maintain the estate. The Lord of Manor title had passed to Anthony Bouch by 1665, and the coal rights passed to the Walker family after a settlement in the chancery court in 1678.

=== Industry ===
The Ingleton Coalfield was worked for 400 years. It is about 6 miles long by 4 miles wide and extends into the neighbouring parishes of Burton in Lonsdale and Thornton-in-Lonsdale. The coalfield terminates at the South Craven fault. The coal measures are shallow and represent the lowest layers in the Pennine coal measures sequence. The earliest coal mining occurred along the River Greta where Four Foot and Six Foot seams outcrop. Most deep mining was at New Ingleton Pit, sunk in 1913. Its sinking led to the discovery of the Ten Foot seam (house and steam coal) at 127 yards, and the Nine Foot seam (steam and house coal) at 134 yards. Beneath them are the Four Foot seam (house, gas and coking coal) at 233 yards, the Three Foot seam (house and gas coal) at 236 yards and the Six Foot seam (steam and house coal) at 260 yards. Commercially viable deposits of fireclay lay under the Three Foot seam and pottery clay beneath the Six Foot seam was used to make Ingleton Bricks. Coal was delivered by horse and cart. Ingleton and Bentham Moors were enclosed in 1767. Plans were drawn up in 1780 to connect Ingleton to the Leeds & Liverpool Canal via Clapham, Settle and Foulridge, Colne but it never progressed. Boys and girls as young as four worked the collieries in the 1780, first as 'messengers' and from six, underground, as 'trailers', pulling coal tubs. The last mine was closed in 1940.

Ingleton Mill was built in 1791 by four partners who also had built a mill in Clapham in 1786. The partners – George Armitstead, a cotton spinner, Ephraim Ellis, William Petty and Thomas Wigglesworth – bought the barn beside the old corn mill and built the mill. They obtained iron for its construction from Kirkstall Forge. They ran a joiner's shop, smithy and cotton mill. It was sold in 1807 and used to spin flax by John Coates, before reverting to cotton spinning in 1837. (National Building Register:63815:.)

== Governance ==
Ingleton is a civil parish. The parish council has 11 councillors and elections are held every four years. Until 1974 it was part of the West Riding of Yorkshire. From 1974 to 2023 it was part of the Craven District, it is now administered by the unitary North Yorkshire Council.

The village is within the Skipton and Ripon parliamentary constituency, represented by Julian Smith, a member of the Conservative Party, since 2010.

== Geography ==
The civil parish of Ingleton is extensive, stretching from Blea Moor near Wold Fell (SD793847) in the north to Newby Moor (SD704698) in the south. The north of the parish follows the county boundary with Lancashire to Whernside (SD739816). From here it follows the ridge south-west to West Fell and down to Thornton Force on the River Twiss, and thence along the river, and the River Greta to Fourlands Hill (SD698713). The east of the parish follows the watershed of the River Ure, a headwater of the River Humber, and the River Ribble to Grove Head where it is only 200m from the Pennine Way, it drops to the B6255 road and the River Ribble at the milepost at SD793816. The boundary follows the Ribble through Ribblehead, then takes the ridge through Park Fell and Simon Fell to Ingleborough. It passes due south over Ingleborough Common to Newbury Moss, descending to Cold Cotes on the old road at SD722712. Ingleborough is 2,373 feet (723 m) high.

The village sits at the foot of Ingleborough, separated from Thornton-in-Lonsdale by the Rivers Greta and Twiss, some of the facilities that form the settlement being thus outside the civil parish. The peaks of Ingleborough and Whernside lies within the parish; separated by the deeply eroded valley of the River Doe. Both these peaks are formed by millstone grit on limestone footings. To the north of the river are the Twistleton Crags with the important limestone pavement of Scales Moor. Here are two SSSIs: Whernside and Scales Moor Common which is managed as stinted pasture. (Note: Stinted common land is a system where the commoners are restricted to the sheep they can keep in the common; this prevents overgrazing) To the south of the river is one SSSI: Ingleton on the stinted Ingleton Common, in the number of an equivalent limestone pavement. This area contains a number of challenging potholes and caves. The show cave White Scar Caves (SD712745) has its entrance in the civil parish. Ingleton Common adjoins Clapham Common and they are collectively referred to as Ingleborough Common.

Historically, mining and agriculture were the predominant industries in the area. Coal was extracted from the Ingleton Coalfield from the early 1600s, to the turn of the 20th century, eventually closing in 1936. The New Village estate was built for mine workers.

== Geology ==
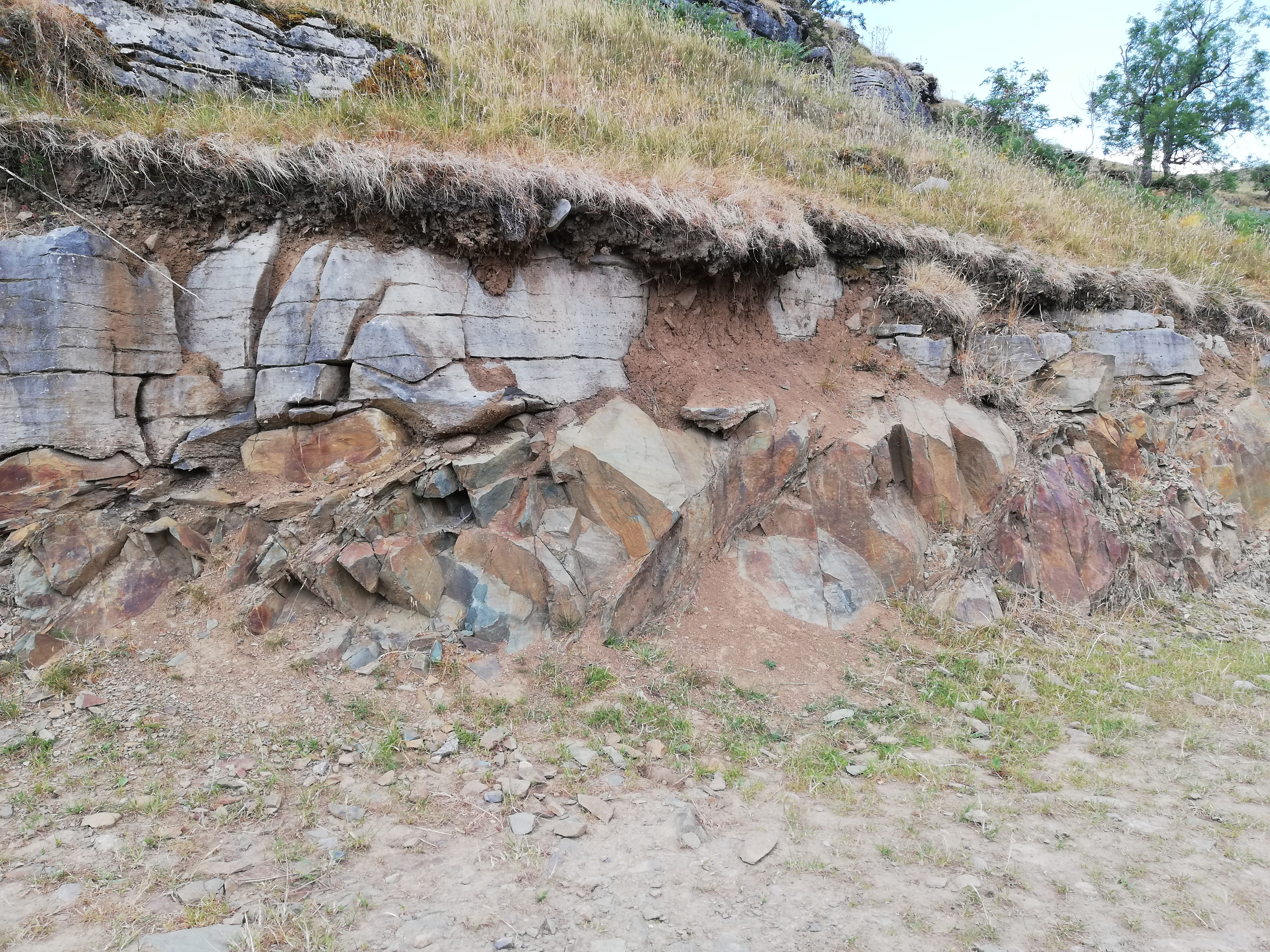
Angular unconformity near the River Twiss above Ingleton

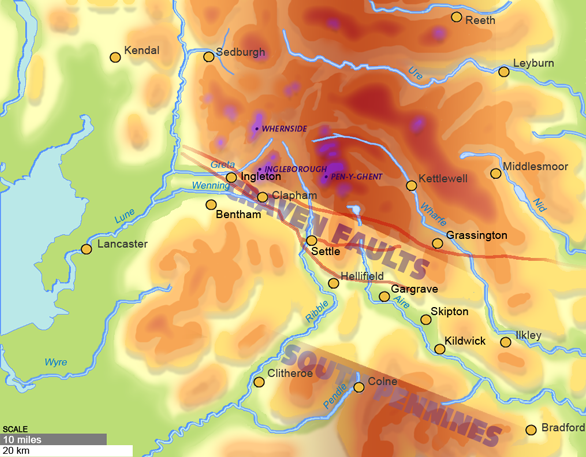
The Craven faults

The strata along the River Twiss, below Quaternary terminal moraine at Raven Ray

A varied geology is found within the boundaries of the parish, ranging from rocks laid down in the Iapetus Ocean in Ordovician times, through the Carboniferous limestones of the Askrigg Block on Whernside and Ingleborough and coal measures within the Craven Basin, to the Quaternary drumlin field in Ribblehead. It is a classic field study area for students of geology.

Much of the parish is dominated by Carboniferous deposits deposited on the submarine platform of the Askrigg Block, which was a relatively high area forming a shelf sea buoyed up by Devonian Wensleydale Granite. It is separated from the Craven Basin to the south and west by the Craven Fault system. The lower Carboniferous deposits are dominated by the 200 metres (660 ft) thick Great Scar limestones laid down during the Viséan stage. A mature karst landscape has formed where it outcrops, with bare limestone pavements, subterranean streams, and major solutional cave systems such as White Scar Caves and Meregill Hole. Scales Moor on the Whernside flanks of Chapel-le-Dale has one of the largest exposures of pavement in the Dales, measuring some 4 kilometres (2.5 mi) long by 800 metres (870 yd) wide. On Whernside and Ingleborough, above the flat plateau formed by the top of the Great Scar limestone, are the Brigantian and Namurian aged Yoredale cyclothem sequences of sandstone, limestone, and shales which were deposited on the edge of a huge delta. The upper ramparts of these hills are capped by thick beds of Grassington Grit, a coarse, poorly sorted sandstone laid down in shallower water as the delta prograded south.

The Carboniferous rocks were deposited unconformably onto basement rocks which are exposed as inliers in Chapel-le-Dale and lower Kingsdale (Swilla Glen). They are Ordovician in age, deposited as turbidites about 480 million years ago in the Iapetus Ocean, and heavily folded and lightly metamorphosed in late Ordovician times. They are currently quarried for roadstone, and were once quarried for slate in the Ingleton Glens.

Just to the north of Ingleton village the Craven Faults running north-west to south-east mark the southern margin of the Askrigg Block. The North Craven Fault has a downthrow of about 200 metres (660 ft), and a few hundred yards away the South Craven Fault has a downthrow of about 1,200 metres (3,900 ft). The fault plane of the North Craven Fault is exposed in Swilla Glen. To the south of the Craven Faults is the Craven Basin where the Westphalian stage Pennine Coal Measures are exposed, once exploited by the Ingleton coalfield.

The landscape in the north-east of the parish, beyond the Ribblehead Viaduct, is dominated by Devensian glacial deposits, and includes some of the Ribblehead Drumlin Field.

== Economy ==
Tourism, mostly from walking and caving, accounts for most of the economic activity of the village, especially in spring and summer. There are craft businesses, such as pottery.

Of two quarries in the parish, Ingleton Quarry, owned by Hanson Aggregates, is active and extracts Ordivician greywacke for roadstone but Meal Bank Quarry that extracted Carboniferous limestone and possessed an early Hoffman kiln is no longer active.

In 1933 an open-air swimming pool was constructed by volunteers, with materials supplied by the New Ingleton Colliery. The European (Objective 5b) Community Fund, the National Lottery and private donations have been used to improve and modernise the pool.

== Landmarks ==
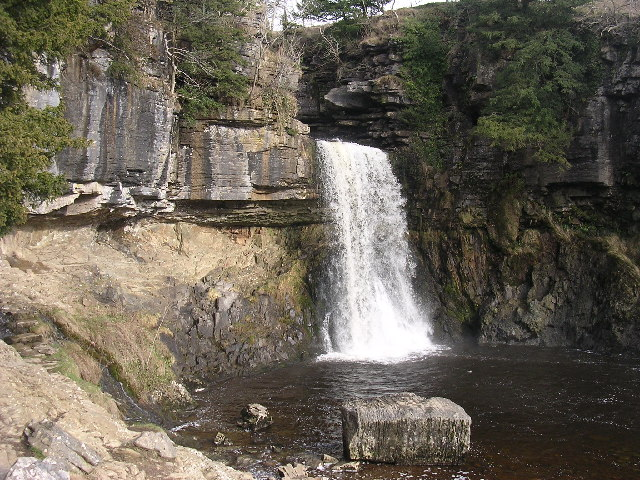
Thornton Force, on the Ingleton Waterfalls Trail

Ingleton is best known for its natural landmarks, since the parish includes the summits of two of the Yorkshire Three Peaks, Ingleborough and Whernside. Two miles north east of the village on the road to Chapel-le-Dale are the show caves at White Scar Caves. An access tunnel has been cut to allow visitors to visit.

The Ingleton Waterfalls Trail is a five-mile (8 km) circular walk from the village, opened in 1885.

Ingleton Viaduct is a Grade II listed structure in the village. Six miles to the north east on Batty Moss is the Ribblehead Viaduct, a Grade II* listed structure on the Settle and Carlisle Line, and on the land underneath and around it, the scheduled remains of the construction camp and navvy settlements.

== Religion ==
The most prominent religious affiliation in Ingleton is Christianity.

Ingleton has three different churches, all from three different Christian denominations, namely Ingleton Parish Church, Ingleton Methodist Chapel, and Ingleton Evangelical Church. The Anglican St Mary's Church, Ingleton, designed by Cornelius Sherlock, dates principally from 1886. It is built on the site of an earlier church. It stands on a bank of boulders and sediment from the last ice age which make for unstable foundations. The Norman font is dated at around 1150, and the 15th-century tower is built in the perpendicular style. The nave was replaced on new compacted foundations in 1743 but demolished in 1886 to make way for the present one, which is built in blue limestone from Skirwith Quarry. The foundations were consolidated with concrete in 1930 and again in 1946. The church was dedicated to St Leonard but in the 18th century the dedication was changed. Other treasures include a Vinegar Bible and a reredos with a carving of the Last Supper.

The vicar of St Mary’s Parish Church is Nick Trenholme. The elders of Ingleton Evangelical Church are Jim Day, John Ellershaw and Steven Tyrer.

== Transport ==
Ingleton had two railway stations at opposite ends of Ingleton Viaduct. Ingleton (Midland) station opened for ten months only in 1849, then reopened in 1861 until 1954. Ingleton (L&NW) station opened along with the Ingleton Branch Line in 1861, but such was the rivalry between competing railway companies that initially passengers were forced to walk between the stations across the Greta valley floor, despite the viaduct between them. The L&NW station closed in 1917. The nearest railway station is now Bentham, 3 1/2 miles (6 km) by road to the south of Ingleton.

The village is on the A65 road between Skipton and Kendal and at the head of the A687 that branches westwards towards Burton in Lonsdale and Lancaster. The B6255 takes the south bank of the River Doe heading north-east to Chapel-le-Dale, Ribblehead and Hawes.

== Local media ==
Since the village is close to the Lancashire and North Yorkshire border, local news and television programmes are provided by BBC North West and Granada Television that broadcast from Salford.

In terms of BBC Local Radio, Ingleton is served by both BBC Radio Lancashire and BBC Radio York. Other radio stations are Heart North West, Greatest Hits Radio, and Dales Radio, a community station which broadcasts across the Yorkshire Dales.

The local newspaper The Westmorland Gazette also covers the village.

== Population change ==
Population changes in Ingleton, North Yorkshire since 1801
Year	1801	1811	1821	1831	1841	1851	1861	1871	1881	1891	1901	1911	1921	1931	1941	1951	1961	2001	2011
Population	1106	1268	1302	1228	1355	1391	---	2541	1625	1568	1672	1672	2464	2227	--- (Note: No census was taken in 1941, due to the Second World War.)	1887	---	1641	1772
Sources: Vision of Britain, Online Historical Population Reports, and 2001 and 2011 UK Census Data

== Education ==
Ingleton Primary School is the only school in Ingleton. It is a partner in 'The Three Peaks Family of Schools', a grouping of secondary schools, primary schools and middle schools, serving North Craven. A small school, it teaches pupils from Nursery (ages 3–4) until Year Six (10–11).

This was once a first school until the re-organisation on 31 August 2012. The pupils transferred to the adjacent Ingleton Middle School after year 5, at the age of ten. They remained here until 13 when the transferred to the upper school in Settle. The Middle School buildings are now used as a Community Information Centre which is run as a not-for-profit organisation. The playing fields have been sold. Settle Middle school buildings were transferred to Settle College to provide the extra capacity needed for two extra year groups.

Students from Ingleton transfer at the age of eleven to the receiving secondary schools, Settle College and Queen Elizabeth School, Kirkby Lonsdale. After secondary education pupils can either stay on to sixth form or transfer to a local college such Kendal College, Lancaster or Morecambe College.

== Facilities ==
Ingleton has a climbing wall that opened in 1987. The oldest part of the building was converted from a barn in the 1980s. The climbing walls are made up of around 300 square metres (3,200 sq ft) of lead. The climbing wall is found down a side street on the opposite side of the road to St Mary’s church. The climbing wall offers children's classes and rock climbing classes.

Ingleton has a community open-air swimming pool which was created in 1933 by a group of workers which included miners from then new Ingleton colliery. Ingleton Primary school uses the community pool to host annual swimming galas. The pool is open in the summer but closed in the winter and autumn. In June 2022, Ingleton Pool featured on the BBC Breakfast as part of the growing public concern about rising energy prices and the effects that might have on the maintenance of the pool. In September 2022, Ingleton swimming pool opened cold water swim sessions for the first time, starting in early September and ending in late October.

== Notable people ==
Reverend Thomas Dod Sherlock was vicar of St Mary the Virgin, Ingleton, from 1874 to 1879.

Professor Jack Stevens (1926–1995), a pioneering hip surgeon, grew up on an Ingleton farm. He graduated from Cambridge and was Chairman of the Department of Orthopaedics in Cook County Hospital, Chicago and Professor of Orthopaedic Surgery in the University of Chicago. From 1972 he held the first chair of Orthopaedic Surgery in Newcastle upon Tyne.

The author Michael Moorcock (born 1939) had a house (Tower House) opposite Ingleton Common from 1971 to 1984 and a number of his books describe the landscapes surrounding Ingleton and other parts of the local countryside. A YouTube video in the Time Out of Mind series shows him and his fellow author M. John Harrison climbing locally.

== See also ==
- Listed buildings in Ingleton, North Yorkshire
