= Chapel-le-Dale =

Hamlet and civil parish in North Yorkshire, England

Coordinates: 54°11′22″N 2°24′14″W

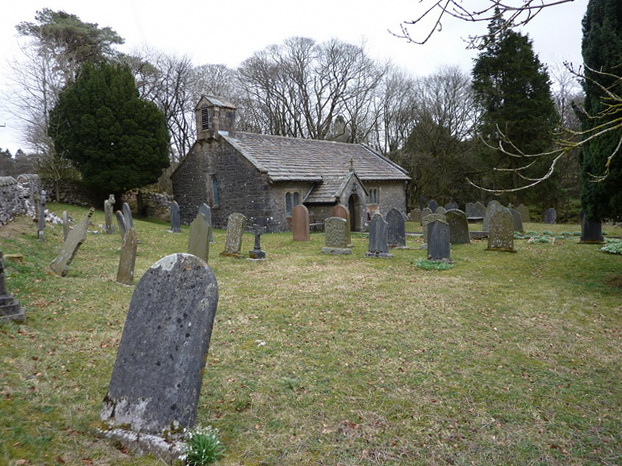
- St Leonards Church

- Location within North Yorkshire
- OS grid reference: SD739769
- Unitary authority: North Yorkshire
- Ceremonial county: North Yorkshire
- Region: Yorkshire and the Humber
- Country: England
- Sovereign state: United Kingdom
- Post town: Carnforth
- Postcode district: LA6
- Police: North Yorkshire
- Fire: North Yorkshire
- Ambulance: Yorkshire
- UK Parliament: Skipton and Ripon

Chapel-le-Dale is a hamlet in the civil parish of Ingleton, North Yorkshire, England. It is in the Yorkshire Dales National Park in a valley of the same name, and was previously in the West Riding of Yorkshire.

== History ==
The hamlet is on the B6255 road between Ingleton and Ribblehead near to the Ribblehead Viaduct. The name derives from Old French and literally means "chapel in the valley". It was first recorded as Chappell ith Dale in 1677. Historically, the hamlet, and its parish, were both in the Wapentake of Ewcross and until 1974 they were in the West Riding of Yorkshire. In 1892, the hamlet was recorded as having a population of 150. Modern-day population statistics are recorded within the civil parish of Ingleton.

The hamlet is near Ingleborough and Whernside and there are several potholes in the vicinity, the best known being Great Douk Cave. There is a pub in the village, The Old Hill Inn, which is used as a starting and ending point for various walks on Whernside or Ingleborough. The source of the River Doe is nearby.

St Leonard's Church is a grade II listed building. It was used as a burial plot for the navvies, and their family members, who died whilst constructing the nearby Ribblehead Viaduct between 1869 and 1876. In all, over 200 people died during the construction from accidents and outbreaks of smallpox. A plaque was erected in the church to their memory. Before the railway's construction, deaths and burials in the dale numbered between two and four people each year on average. A survey of the parish records from 1876 showed an average of 44 burials per year between 1870 and 1875.
