= Ribblehead =

Area near the River Ribble in North Yorkshire, England

Coordinates: 54.215°N 2.340°W

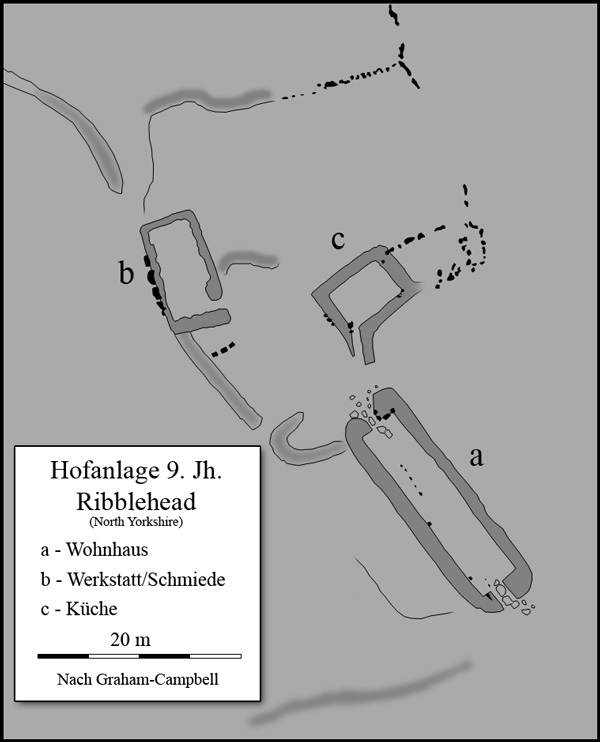
Ribblehead excavation 9th century (North Yorkshire)

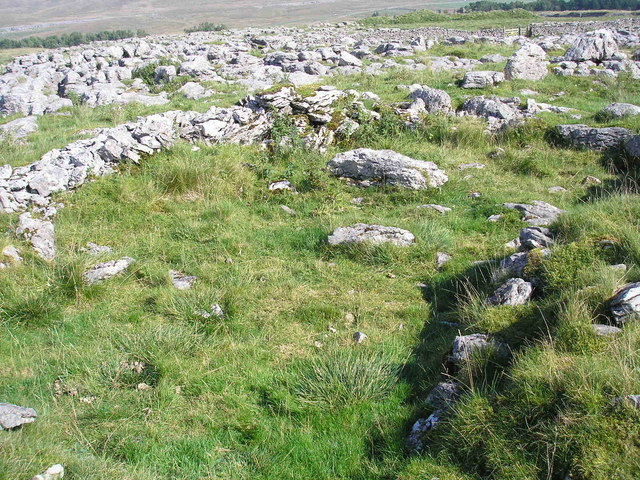
The domestic kitchen found during the excavation

Ribblehead is the area of moorland at the head of the River Ribble in the area known as Ribblesdale, in the Yorkshire Dales National Park, England.

Ribblehead is most notable for Ribblehead railway station and Ribblehead Viaduct on the Settle to Carlisle railway. It is in North Yorkshire with its nearest town being Ingleton. It has some accommodation catering mainly for hikers and a small local population. It is also a point on the Dales Way and Yorkshire Three Peaks walks, in sight of major local peaks including Ingleborough and Whernside.

== History ==
=== Roman road ===
The Roman road across Batty Moss crosses the railway line just north of Ribblehead station, just before the viaduct begins and past the Station Inn. The modern B6255 road follows its line.

Plans to update Cam High Road, a smaller Roman road, to allow for commercial forestry are being opposed.

=== Viking farmstead ===
Archaeological research revealed the presence of a Scandinavian farmstead, with three large buildings around a paved farmyard, including a longhouse and a smithy, and suggesting that the present weathered conditions date from later than this farmstead of around the 9th century.

=== Settle and Carlisle Railway ===
The viaduct across Batty Moss was constructed between 1870 and 1874 by the Midland Railway as part of the Settle-Carlisle Line.

== Community ==
The area is part of the civil parish of Ingleton.

The ecclesiastical parish is St. Leonard, Ingleton, and there is a small church dedicated to St. Leonard at Chapel-le-Dale.

The area is served by Ribblehead railway station, and Summer Sunday DalesBus routes 830, 831, 832 from Darlington or Morecambe stop at the station.
