= Avril Robarts Library =

University library in Liverpool, England

Coordinates: 53.4111°N 2.9884°W

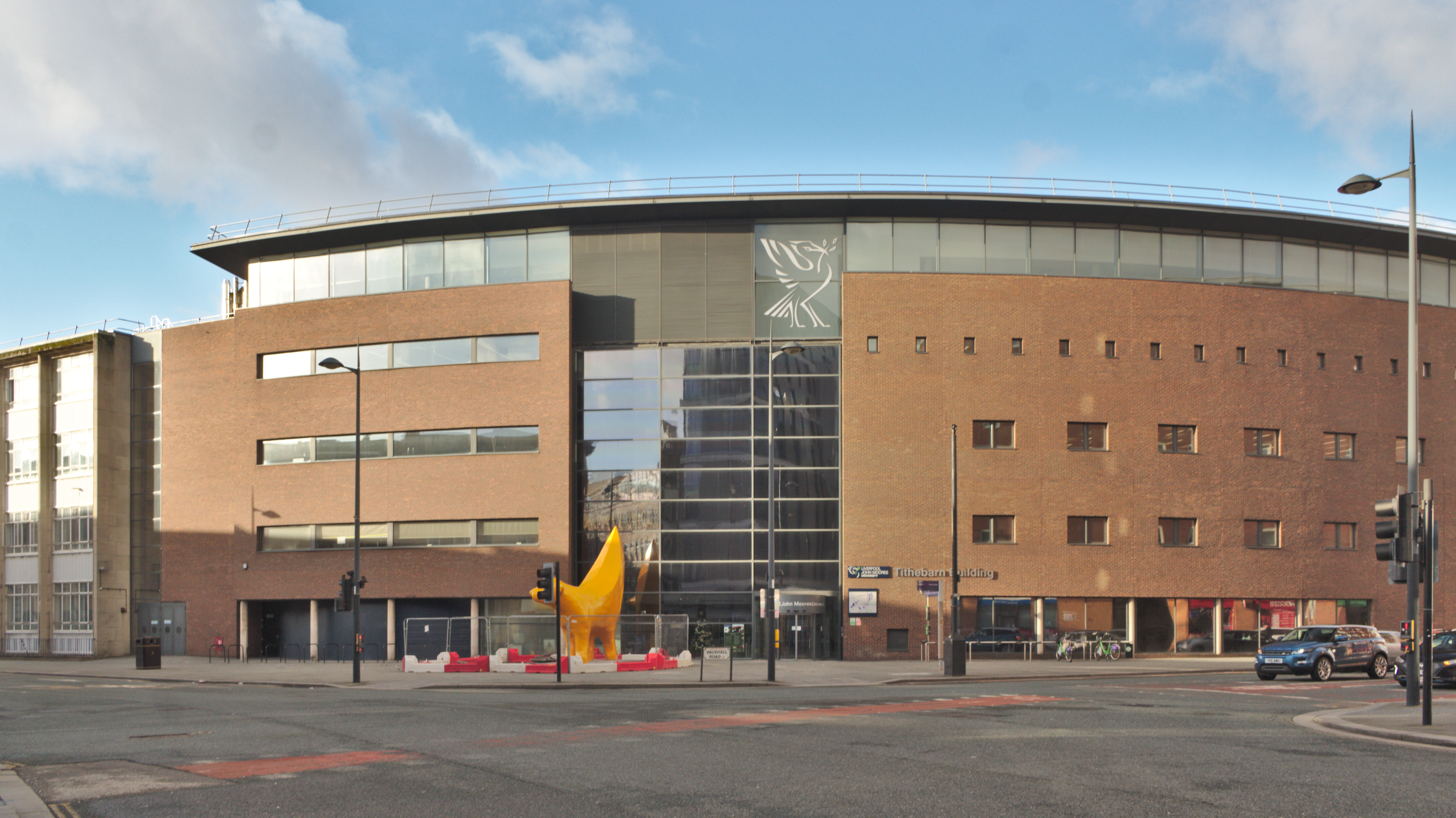
- The Avril Robarts Library, with the Superlambanana (then under refurbishment) in the front
- Location: Tithebarn Street; Liverpool; England, United Kingdom
- Type: Academic library
- Established: 1997; 29 years ago
- Branch of: Liverpool John Moores University

Other information
- Director: Maxine Melling
- Website: Avril Robarts Library online

The Avril Robarts Library (formerly the Avril Robarts Learning Resource Centre (LRC)) is one of the two designated libraries belonging to Liverpool John Moores University (LJMU) in Liverpool, England. It stands at 79 Tithebarn Street and serves the City Campus located mostly on Byrom Street.

Its award-winning, Tithebarn building was designed by architects Austin-Smith:Lord, and built in 1997. (Note: This firm also designed the Aldham Robarts Library) To its front, is the Superlambanana, a sculpture of Liverpool. The building is alternatively known locally by students as, the Tithebarn (after the building) or (Super)lambanana building (after the statue in front).

The university library has a gross floor area of 6,159 m^{2} (66,290 sq ft), larger than the other library of the university, the Aldham Robarts Library, and the former IM Marsh library. The four-storey building contains 308 personal computers alongside countless books and online catalogues that cater mainly to the students of the Faculties of Science, Engineering and Technology and Education, Health and Community. Wi-Fi is available throughout the complex, which can be entered by scanning a relevant student ID card by the ground floor turnstiles. Other services available include research and learner support, IT Support, Skills@LJMU, welfare and counselling and employability advice.

It is a member of the Libraries Together: Liverpool Learning Partnership (evolved from Liverpool Libraries Group) which formed in 1990. Under which, a registered reader at any of the member libraries can have access rights to the other libraries within the partnership.

== History ==
In the 1990s, LJMU embarked on an initiative of improving the study spaces and libraries for its students. The first library constructed through this initiative was the Aldham Robarts Library, on Maryland Street, serving LJMU's Mount Pleasant Campus. The library was described to be a great success for the university and its students, leading to the decision to construct another LRC near LJMU's City Campus, with the initial proposal made in early 1992, and after governors considered the financing of the project, the LRC's relationship with the capital development programme, and the estates strategy, the proposal was clarified in the Strategic Plan 1992-1996 (Liverpool John Moores University, 1993).

=== Planning ===
==== Existing libraries ====
The, then Avril Robarts Learning Resource Centre was intended to replace two existing LJMU libraries in the area, which were deemed too close to teaching areas.

The Humanities Library, covering 1,660 square metres (17,900 ft^{2}), served the Division of Education, Health and Social Sciences. The library only contained 16 PCs for student use within the library itself, with additional 106 PCs located in the computer rooms on the floor below. This limited capacity, followed by a growth in LJMU's student numbers, put increased pressure on the library, leading into a search for possible solutions, which ultimately was decided to be a new library.

The other LRC, Avril Robarts replaced, was the engineering and science "library", containing 110 PCs in a mix of two teaching rooms and an open space area. It occupied the second and third floors of the James Parsons Building, on Byrom Street.

==== Alternatives considered ====
Earlier proposals for constructing a new LRC included a 7,000 square metres (75,000 ft^{2}) building alongside a Technology Transfer Centre (TTC), the latter was later built as the Peter Jost Enterprise Centre, on Byrom Street. With Austin-Smith: Lord being the building's architect. However, the LRC aspect in a building on Byrom Street failed to materialize.

Another site considered was the area adjacent to Trueman Street, near the Henry Cotton Building, but space in these sites at the time was either unavailable or too expensive.

==== Tithebarn Street ====
After the other proposals were discarded, the idea of developing the LRC adjacent to the former College of Commerce, located between Tithebarn Street and Smithfield Street, which had been part of the original polytechnic in 1970, had been put forward. The nearby car park, located next to the building, on the intersection of Tithebarn Street, and Vauxhall Road, was considered. The site provided a reasonable area, the original proposals asked for 7,400m^{2} of space, however, to reduce costs, a 5,500m^{2} site was ultimately decided, with the university retaining the use of computing suites on the Trueman Street site, and the second floor of the James Parsons Building, to make up for the smaller LRC.

Concerns following the decision were expressed, most notably the distance of the LRC from Byrom Street, with the distance being a 10-minute walk from first floor to first floor. Although these issues can be minimised in multiple ways, such as block timetabling, which gave students the possibility of having complete half days free, allowing students the use of the LRC without impacting their timetable or study time. This would lead to the LRC being used for more long-stay purposes, rather than a short stay to return materials or check references, a student would stay longer in the centre to make better use of the facility, leading to longer stay study becoming the norm. According to Revill, the attraction of a new building, hosting a larger capacity of 200 PCs, meant that the usage of the centre would be equal to the two libraries it replaces, with the usage of the centre expected to increase to about double a year after opening.

To improve connectivity between the LRC and Byrom Street, initiatives to install improved pedestrian crossings along the A59 Byrom Street dual-carriageway were followed through. Further proposals including the creation of a university square in front of the LRC, at the intersections of Tithebarn St, Vauxhall Rd, Hatton Garden and Great Crosshall St, a student dubbing as a "Harvard Square", were not followed through.

=== Development ===
The architects Austin-Smith:Lord, the mechanical and electrical consultants Ernest Griffith and Son, and quantity surveyor Gleeds, and structural engineers and planning supervisors Wright Mottershaw, were appointed for the project. A small design team was then later established, with the team visiting many other institutions at the time including: Thames Valley University, Anglian Polytechnic University, University of North London, Edge Hill College of Higher Education, and the Aytoun Library of Manchester Metropolitan University.

The total budget for the project was set to £8,700,000 including, construction, professional fees, and acquisition of the site. Construction was under a management contract with John Mowlem Construction plc. Wright Mottershaw were the planning supervisors for the project under the construction (design and management) regulations. The client for the contract was JMU Learning Resource Development Ltd.

==== Naming ====
The building is named after Avril Robarts, the wife of Aldham Robarts, a businessman and the benefactor for the first LRC, who has made a significant contribution towards the costs of the second LRC. Local students commonly refer to the library by other unofficial names, such as the Tithebarn building (or simply Tithebarn), or the (Super)lambanana building.

=== Refurbishment ===
Completed in 2020, the Avril Robarts Library underwent a complete refurbishment, with the 2nd & 3rd floors refurbished first, opening in early 2020, and the remaining ground & 1st floor reopening in October 2020.

The project consisted of the refurbishment and alteration of the university facilities in the building to provide internet café facilities, offices, reception and meeting areas. The construction and development of the refurbishment was conducted by Whitfield Brown Ltd and Willmott Dixon Construction, and the architect for the project was Weightman & Bullen. The project's value was £310,000, over a 33 week contract period.

The refurbishment was carried out in three phases with overall completion in late 2020. The library refurbishment is part of the wider Tithebarn Building project by LJMU, which also involved the extension and enhancement of the nearby School of Nursing and Allied Health in an extension of the Tithebarn Building.

The refurbishment and wider Tithebarn Building project was part of LJMU’s estates masterplan, which involves the construction of a Student Life Building and Sports Building on Copperas Hill, a Pavilion at Aldham Robarts Library and a School of Education building on Maryland Street. The latter two within the existing Mount Pleasant Campus, the Copperas Hill site is located adjacent to Mount Pleasant and Liverpool Lime Street station.

== Building ==
The Avril Robarts Library is housed within the Tithebarn Building. The building is curved with a 72-metre (236 ft) radius, covered with a long brick and glass facade, which rounds the curve from Tithebarn Street to Vauxhall Road. The curved structure is made of a steel frame on piled foundations. The building also hosts the university's School of Health, a 200-seat Stanton Fuller lecture theatre, and a cafe.

== General information ==
=== Location ===
Avril Robarts Library is at 79 Tithebarn Street in Liverpool, L2 2ER (England). The library supports the:

Faculty of Engineering and Technology, which includes the following departments:

- Astrophysics Research Institute
- Centre for Entrepreneurship
- Department of Applied Mathematics
- Department of the Built Environment
- Department of Civil Engineering
- Department of Computer Science
- Department of Electronics and Electrical Engineering
- Department of Maritime and Mechanical Engineering
- Engineering and Technology Research Institute
- LJMU Maritime Centre

Faculty of Science, which includes the following schools:

- School of Natural Sciences and PsychologyHumanities and Social Science
- School of Pharmacy and Biomolecular Sciences
- School of Sport and Exercise Sciences

Students must have their ID cards to access the building (by-passing turnstiles) and accessing id-locked services.

== See also ==
- Aldham Robarts Library
- Former IM Marsh Library
- List of libraries in Liverpool
