= Irene Marsh =

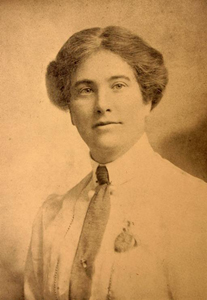
- Born: 3 December 1875; Walton
- Died: 3 April 1938 (aged 62); Aigburth
- Other names: I.M. Marsh
- Education: Southport Physical Training College and Gymnasium
- Occupation: teacher of women's physical education
- Known for: promoter of women's physical education

Irene Mabel Marsh (3 December 1875 – 3 April 1938) was a British promoter of women's physical education. She started the Liverpool Physical Training College to train women to teach physical education. This became the I.M. Marsh College of Physical Education and part of Liverpool John Moores University. Their IM Marsh Campus was named after her.

== Life ==
Marsh was born in Walton in 1875. She was one of ten children. Her home had its own parallel bars and a trapeze and she went to a local gymnasium and to Bootle Public Baths.

She excelled at sport and in teaching others to swim. She attended Southport Physical Training College and Gymnasium. In 1900 she opened Liverpool Physical Training College which was the fourth British physical training college for women. She financed it using £100 she had saved by working from home and walking to work. The college was to train women to teach physical education and would in time became part of Liverpool John Moores University. It began with her sister being the first student. She enjoyed the support of Bishop F. J. Chavasse, Archdeacon T. J. Madden and the leading orthopaedic surgeon Robert Jones and by 1908 there was eight full time staff.

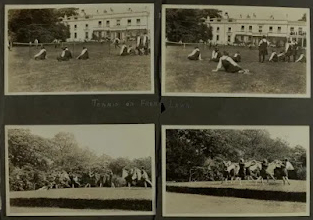
1924 images of IM Marsh's College in Liverpool

She bought land and Barkhill House outside the city centre in 1919 and she opened a junior section in 1920. She remained ambitious for her college and in 1936 the first three of her students were awarded a diploma in the theory and practice of physical education by London University.

== Death and legacy ==
Marsh died in Aigburth in 1938. In 1939 the college was renamed the I.M. Marsh College of Physical Education. In 2022 the Bark Hill house was listed which saved it from demolition.
