= Aldham Robarts Library =

University library in Liverpool, England

Coordinates: 53.4029°N 2.9717°W

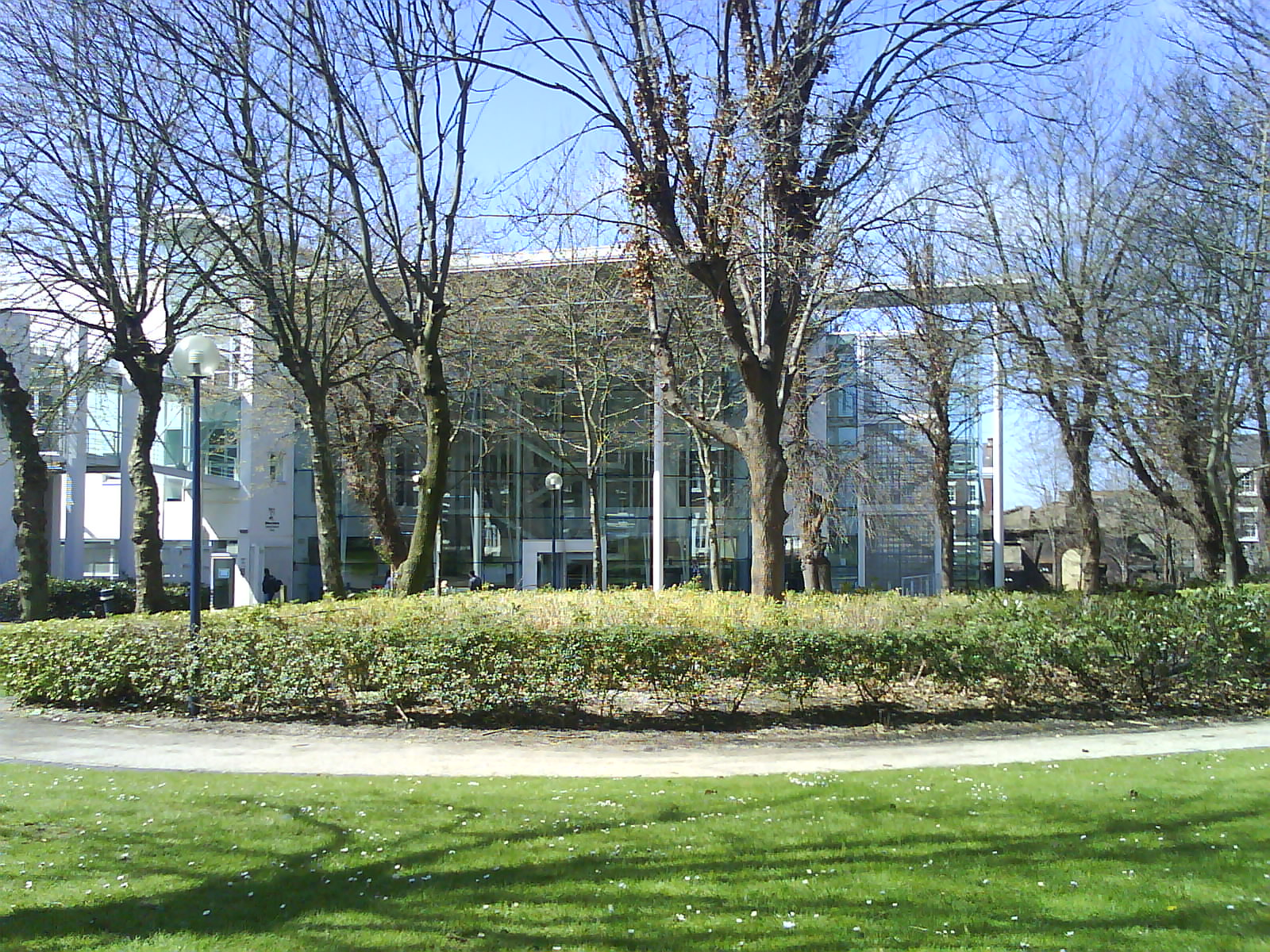
- The Aldham Robarts Library as viewed from Mount Pleasant gardens
- Location: Maryland Street; Liverpool; England, United Kingdom
- Type: Academic library
- Established: 1994
- Branch of: Liverpool John Moores University

Other information
- Website: Aldham Robarts Library online

The Aldham Robarts Library (formerly the Aldham Robarts Learning Resource Centre (LRC)), is one of two designated libraries belonging to Liverpool John Moores University (LJMU) in Liverpool, England. It is located at Maryland Street and serves the Mount Pleasant Campus situated in Liverpool's Knowledge Quarter. Designed by the architectural firm Austin-Smith:Lord and built in 1994, the Aldham Robarts Library has won numerous architectural awards. The four-storey, 5,324 m^{2} (57,310 sq ft) building contains 386 personal computers alongside countless books and online catalogues that cater mainly for the Faculty of Arts, Professional and Social Studies and the Faculty of Business and Law. Wi-Fi is available throughout the complex, which can be entered by scanning a relevant student ID card by the ground floor turnstiles. Other services available in the Library include research and learner support. The Aldham Robarts Library is open 7 days a week during term time.

It is a member of Liverpool Libraries Together, under which, a registered reader at any of the member libraries can have access rights to the other libraries within the partnership.

The library is named after the founder of the Wirral Globe newspaper, Aldham "Aldie" Robarts (29 July 1929 - 29 August 2021).

== See also ==
- Avril Robarts Library
- List of libraries in Liverpool
