= Austin-Smith:Lord =

British architectural firm

Austin-Smith:Lord is a British architectural firm, established in 1949.

The company originated as JM Austin-Smith & Partner in 1949, set up in London by husband and wife team, John Michael and Inette Austin-Smith. The couple had met at the Architectural Association, which they left in 1947 to complete a town planning course. The Austin-Smiths retired in 1981.

The firm won the UK Best Practice Award at the Architects' Journal awards in 2010. The Wales office also won the Wales Regional Best Practice Award.

The Cardiff office was opened in 1995. In 2008 the company had 170 staff across the UK. As well as designing new buildings the company has a specialisism in restoration.

== Selected designs ==
- Manchester Arena (1995, co-designers)
- National Army Museum North (2002 design competition winners; cancelled in 2003)
- Riverfront Arts Centre, Newport (2004)
- Avril Robarts LRC
- Foundation for Art and Creative Technology
- G Live
- John Rylands Library (2007 extension)
- Leeds City Museum
- Aldham Robarts LRC
- Llanelly House (restoration)
- National Botanic Garden of Wales (Gallery and Visitor Centre)
- Music Hall, Shrewsbury
- St Teilo's Church in Wales High School
- Wolverhampton bus station (2011)
