= Liverpool John Moores University =

University in Liverpool, England

- Coat of arms
- Other name: LJMU
- Former names: 1823 - Liverpool Mechanics' School of Arts; 1970 - Liverpool Polytechnic
- Motto: Latin: Audentes fortuna juvat
- Motto in English: Fortune favours the bold
- Type: Public
- Established: 1992 - university status
- Affiliations: AACSB; MillionPlus; EUA; Northern Consortium
- Chancellor: Nisha Katona
- Vice-Chancellor: Mark Power
- Administrative staff: 1,095
- Students: 25,650 (2024/25)
- Undergraduates: 20,275 (2024/25)
- Postgraduates: 5,380 (2024/25)
- Location: Liverpool, United Kingdom; 53.403°N 2.970°W
- Campus: Urban
Colours
- Website: ljmu.ac.uk

Liverpool John Moores University (abbreviated LJMU) is a public research university in the city of Liverpool, United Kingdom. The university can trace its origins to the Liverpool Mechanics' School of Arts, established in 1823. This later merged to become Liverpool Polytechnic. In 1992, following an Act of Parliament, the Liverpool Polytechnic became what is now Liverpool John Moores University. It is named after Sir John Moores, a local businessman and philanthropist, who donated to the university's precursor institutions.

The university had 25,050 students in 2024/25, of which 20,105 are undergraduate students and 4,945 are postgraduate, making it the 30th largest university in the UK by total student population.

It is a member of the AACSB, MillionPlus, the Northern Consortium and the European University Association.

== History ==
=== Origins ===
Founded as a small mechanics institution (Liverpool Mechanics' School of Arts) in 1823, the institution grew over the centuries by converging and amalgamating with different colleges, including the F. L. Calder School of Domestic Science, the C. F. Mott College of Education, before eventually becoming Liverpool Polytechnic in 1970. The university also has a long history of providing training, education and research to the maritime industry, dating back to the formation of the Liverpool Nautical College in 1892.

A predecessor called the Liverpool Gymnasium College was founded in 1900 as a college for training physical education teachers by Irene Marsh, an early advocate for women's physical education. Initially located at 110 Bedford Street, near the city centre, the college expanded over time. In 1947 the institution was renamed the I.M. Marsh College of Physical Education, becoming the first state-maintained specialist college for women's physical education in the United Kingdom. In 1981, the college became part of Liverpool Polytechnic. The I.M. Marsh Campus remained in operation until its closure in July 2021, following the relocation of academic activities to LJMU's city centre campuses.

The institution then became a university under the terms of the Further and Higher Education Act 1992 under the new title of "Liverpool John Moores University". This new title was approved by the Privy Council on 15 September 1992. The university took its name from Sir John Moores, the founder of the Littlewoods empire. Moores was a great believer in the creation of opportunity for all, which embodies the ethos of LJMU in providing educational routes for people of all ages and from all backgrounds. This belief led Sir John Moores to invest in the institution and facilities, such as the John Foster Building (housing the Liverpool Business School), designed by and named after leading architect John Foster. With the institution's backgrounds dating back as far as 1823, many of the university buildings date back also, with aesthetically pleasing Georgian and Victorian buildings found on a few of the campuses.

=== Present day ===
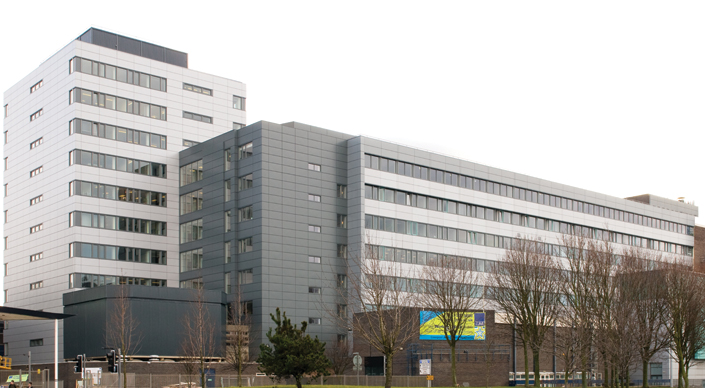
The James Parsons Building at LJMU's City Campus

LJMU now has more than 27,000 students from over 100 countries world-wide, 2,400 staff and 250 degree courses. LJMU was awarded the Queen's Anniversary Prize in 2005.

Currently, Liverpool John Moores University is receiving more applications than previously seen; according to data in 2009, the total number of applications submitted to LJMU was 27,784.

On 28 March 2022, former student and founder of Mowgli Street Food, Nisha Katona was installed as chancellor of the university. Previously, in 2008, astrophysicist and Queen lead guitarist Brian May was appointed the fourth Chancellor of Liverpool John Moores University. He replaced outgoing Chancellor Cherie Blair, wife of former Prime Minister Tony Blair. Honorary fellows in attendance at the ceremony included astronomer Sir Patrick Moore and actor Pete Postlethwaite. May was succeeded as Chancellor by judge Sir Brian Leveson in 2013.

LJMU is a founding member of the Northern Consortium, an educational charity owned by 11 universities in northern England.

== Campuses ==
The university is separated into two campuses in Liverpool:

- City Campus, mainly situated on Byrom Street and surrounding Great Crosshall Street up to Liverpool Exchange railway station, houses buildings such as the James Parsons Building, City Campus Library (formerly known as the Avril Robarts Library) and the Faculty of Health, Innovation, Technology and Science.
- Mount Pleasant Campus, next to the Liverpool Metropolitan Cathedral and the University of Liverpool, contains the John Lennon Art and Design Building, Mount Pleasant Campus Library (formerly known as the Aldham Robarts Library) and is home to the Faculty of Society and Culture. The Knowledge Quarter is also regarded to be part of this campus.

Between the two campuses is the Copperas Hill Site, opened in summer 2021, and home to the Student Life and LJMU Sports Buildings. Its location between the two sites has been described by the university to help connect both of its campuses together, and is not regarded to be part of either. It is however closer to the Mount Pleasant Campus and separated from the City Campus by the A5047, and Liverpool Lime Street railway station.

=== Libraries ===
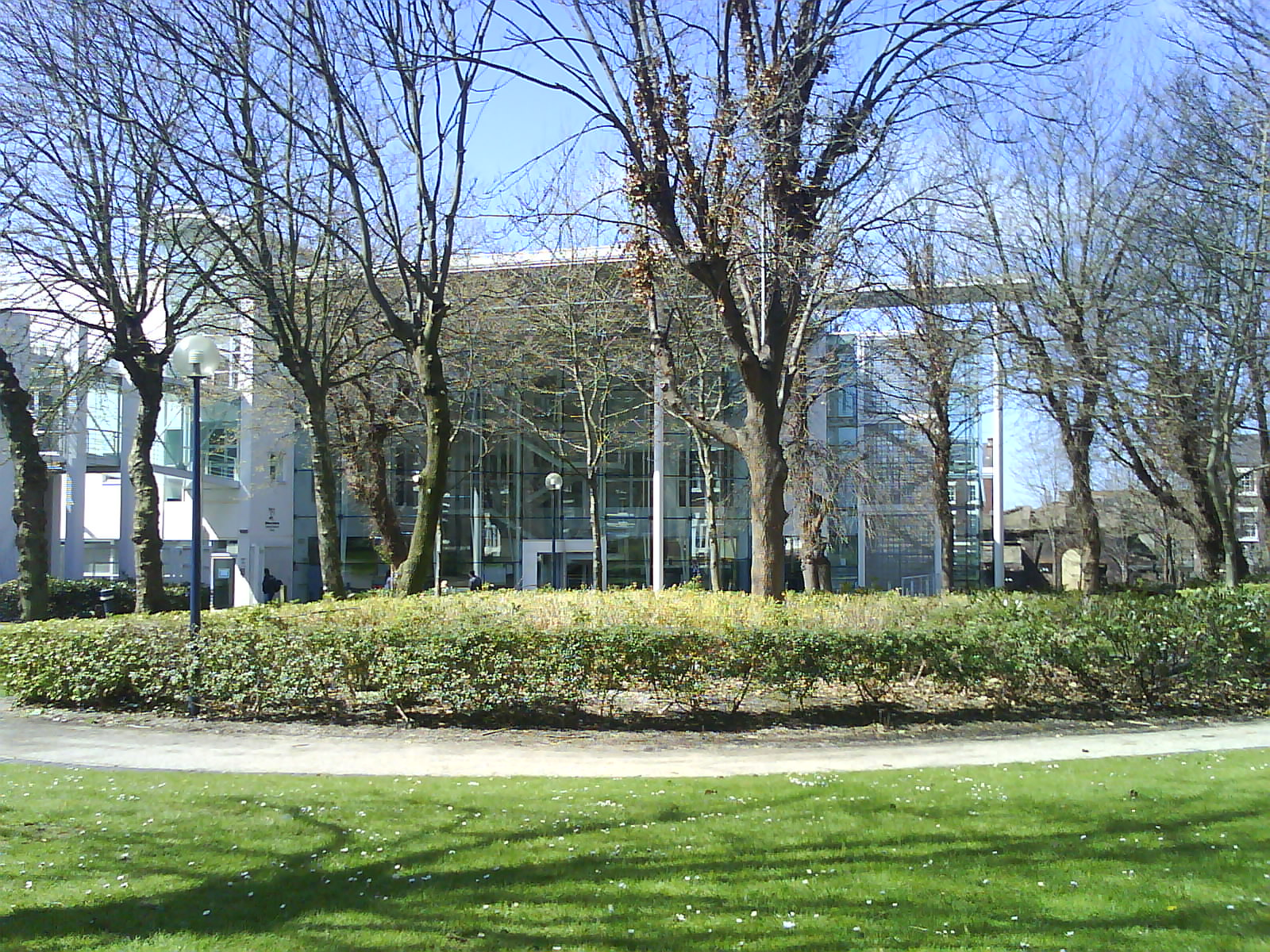
Mount Pleasant Campus Library as viewed from Mount Pleasant campus

There are currently two libraries operated by LJMU, one for either campus:

- The Mount Pleasant Campus Library (formerly known as the Aldham Robarts Library) provides for students studying at the Mount Pleasant Campus or otherwise residing in the central Knowledge Quarter area. The library is situated on Maryland Street and caters mainly for the Faculty of Society and Culture.
- The City Campus Library (formerly known as the Avril Robarts Library) mainly provides services to students studying in the City Campus. It is located on Tithebarn Street, and covers the Faculty of Health, Innovation, Technology and Science. The library hosts the Superlambanana sculpture at its front.

There is an LRC present in the Learning Commons of the Student Life Building on the Copperas Hill site between the two campuses.

Students of the university can use any library in term-time and some non-term time periods within the library's opening hours. The Student Life Building is open 24/7 in term time. Students need their student identification card for entry to all buildings.

There are more than 68,500 books in the Libraries' collections, with 1,630 work spaces available for students 24 hours a day. In addition to this there are over 16,000 e-books and 5,000 e-journals available. It is a member of the Libraries Together: Liverpool Learning Partnership (evolved from Liverpool Libraries Group) which formed in 1990. Under which, a registered reader at any of the member libraries can have access rights to the other libraries within the partnership.

=== Tom Reilly Building ===
The Tom Reilly Building houses the School of Sports and Exercise Sciences and the School of Psychology, which are both part of the Faculty of Health, Innovation, Technology and Science. Some 8,000 students use the building which is located at LJMU's City Campus on Byrom Street. The five storey, 6,493 m^{2} (69,890 sq ft) building was completed in November 2009 and opened in March 2010 by Liverpool F.C. captain Steven Gerrard. The building provides sports and science facilities including; appetite laboratories, psychology testing labs, neuroscience labs, an indoor 70 m (230 ft) running track, force plates, caren disc, physiology suites, a DEXA scanner, a driving simulator and a chronobiology lab.

=== James Parsons Building ===
The James Parsons Building is located at the City Campus and was built in 1960 as part of Liverpool Polytechnic. Later additions were made in 1966 and 1970, an extensive modernisation took place internally and externally in 2010. The James Parsons Building has a gross floor area of 29,833 m^{2} (321,120 sq ft) and at its tallest is 13 storeys high. Several schools within the Faculty of Health, Innovation, Technology and Science are based in the building – which has laboratories, ICT suites and lecture theatres throughout as well as two cafés.

The entire third floor of the James Parsons Building was the first internal aspect to be renovated, whilst cladding worth £3.4 million was applied to the external facade during 2009 and 2010.

== Organisation and structure ==
=== Faculties ===
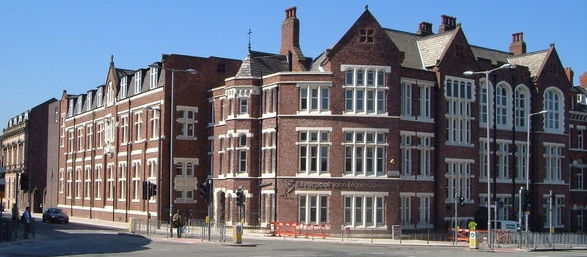
Liverpool Business School

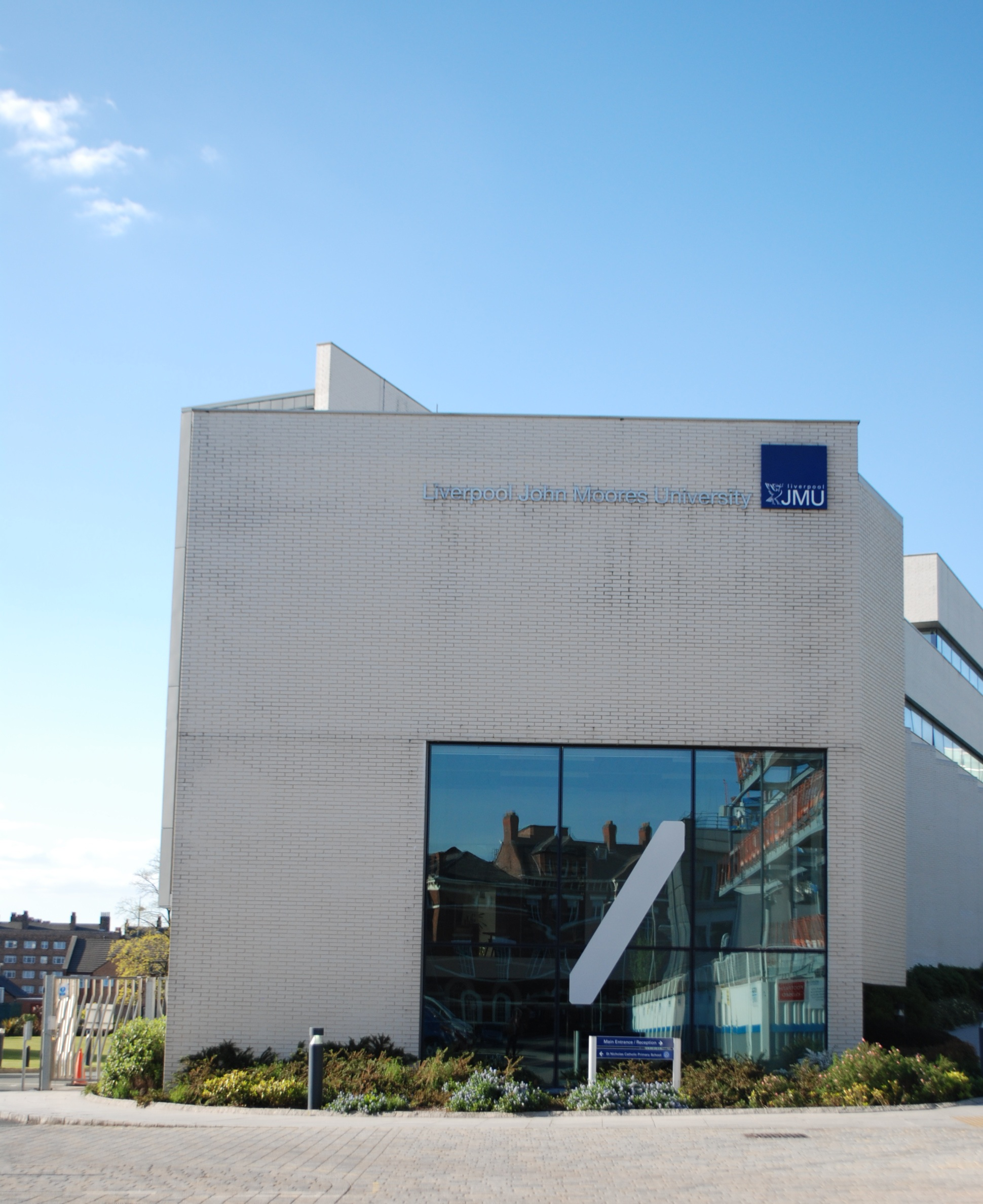
John Lennon Art and Design Building

The university is organised into two faculties (each split into schools) which are based at the separate campus sites. The two faculties and their schools are:

Faculty of Society and Culture (Mount Pleasant Campus)

- Liverpool Business School
- Liverpool School of Art and Creative Industries
- School of Education
- School of Humanities and Social Science
- School of Law and Justice Studies

Faculty of Health, Innovation, Technology and Science (City Campus)

- Astrophysics Research Institute
- LJMU Maritime Centre
- Public Health Institute
- School of Biological and Environmental Sciences
- School of Civil Engineering and Built Environment
- School of Computer Science and Mathematics
- School of Engineering
- School of Nursing and Advanced Practice
- School of Pharmacy and Biomolecular Sciences
- School of Psychology
- School of Public and Allied Health
- School of Sport and Exercise Sciences

== Academic profile ==
LJMU is highly ranked for teaching and research in Sports and Exercise Sciences. The Higher Education Funding Council for England (HEFCE) awarded LJMU £4.5 million over five years for the establishment of a Centre for Excellence in Teaching and Learning (CETL). The CETL award recognises LJMU's record for Physical Education, Dance, Sport and Exercises Sciences. LJMU is the only United Kingdom university to be awarded an Ofsted Grade A in Physical Education and it is also the premier institution for both teaching and research in Sport and Exercise Sciences.

=== Business School ===
Liverpool Business School (LBS) is located in the Redmonds Building on the Mount Pleasant Campus and has over 2,500 students and 100 academics.

LBS offers undergraduate, postgraduate (including an Executive MBA) and research based programmes. Research areas include International Banking, Economics and Finance, Sustainable Enterprise, Public Service Management, Development of Modern Economic Thought, Performance Management, Marketing, Project Management, and Market Research.

=== Research ===
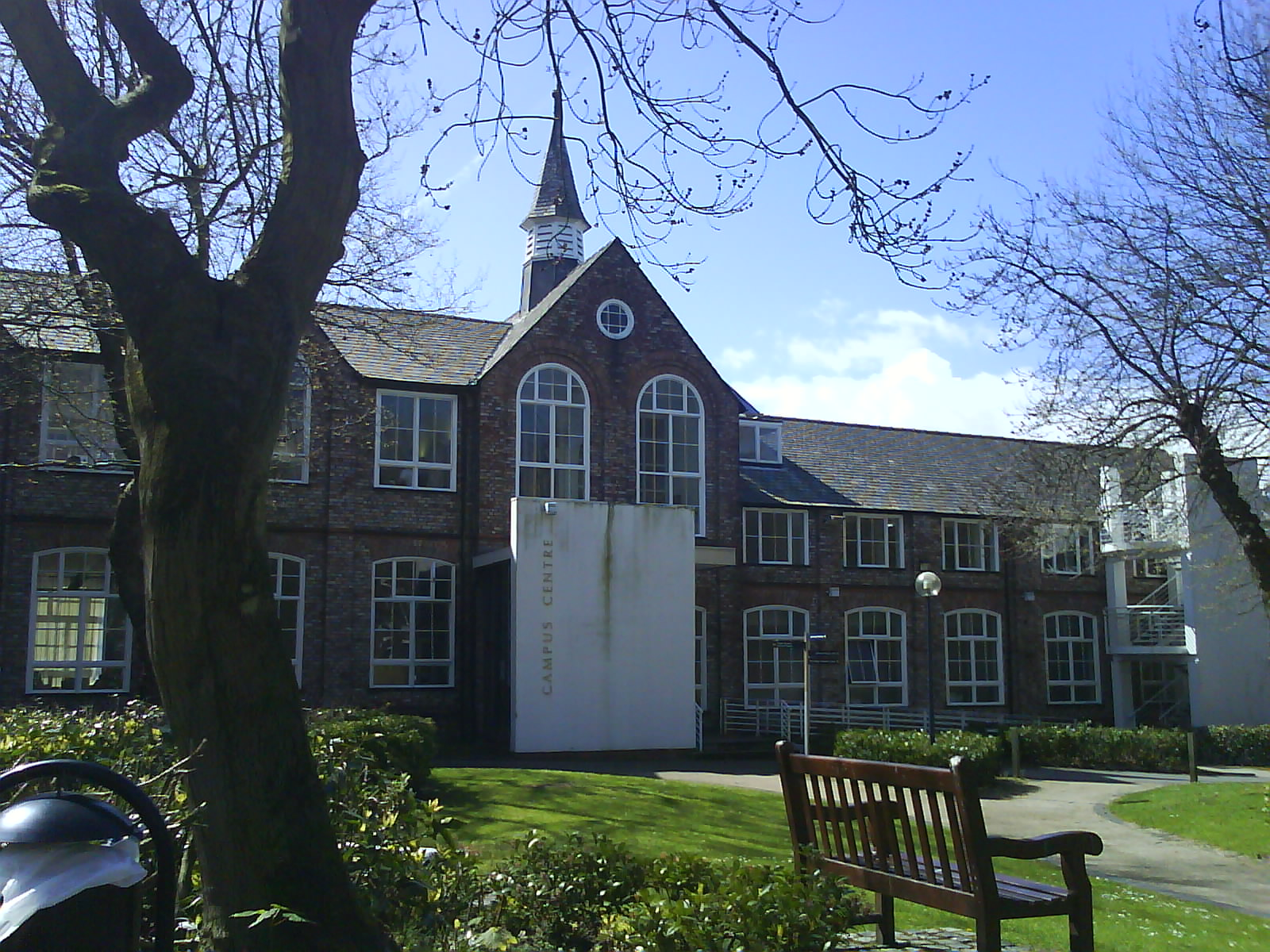
Mount Pleasant Campus Centre

In the 2001 Research Assessment Exercise (RAE), LJMU reported notable research strengths in general engineering and sports-related sciences. By the 2008 RAE, LJMU was the top-performing post-92 university for Anthropology, Electrical and Electronic Engineering, General Engineering, Physics (Astrophysics) and Sports-Related Studies. According to the UK Research Assessment Exercise 2014 (RAE 2014), LJMU every unit of assessment submitted was rated as at least 45% internationally excellent or better. In 2012, the university's scientist published notable research suggesting that the dinosaur's extinction may have been caused by increased methane production from the dinosaurs, with some informally saying that dinosaurs "farted" their way to extinction.

=== Rankings ===
Rankings
National rankings
- Complete (2027): 76
- Guardian (2027): 53
- Times / Sunday Times (2027): 54

Global rankings
- ARWU (2026): 501–600
- QS (2027): 851–900
- THE (2026): 501–600

Liverpool John Moores University was included in the new 2013 Times Higher Education 100 under 50, ranking 72 out of 100. The list aims to show the rising stars in the global academy under the age of 50 years.

First Destination Survey results show that 89% of LJMU graduates are in employment or undertaking postgraduate study within six months of graduating.

== Student life ==
=== Students' Union ===
Students at the university are represented by the John Moores Students' Union.

Representation for all students is central and is conducted by executive officers elected annually. In most cases, these students will be on a sabbatical from their studies. The election process is normally contested in mid April, successful candidates assuming office the following academic year.

=== Sports ===
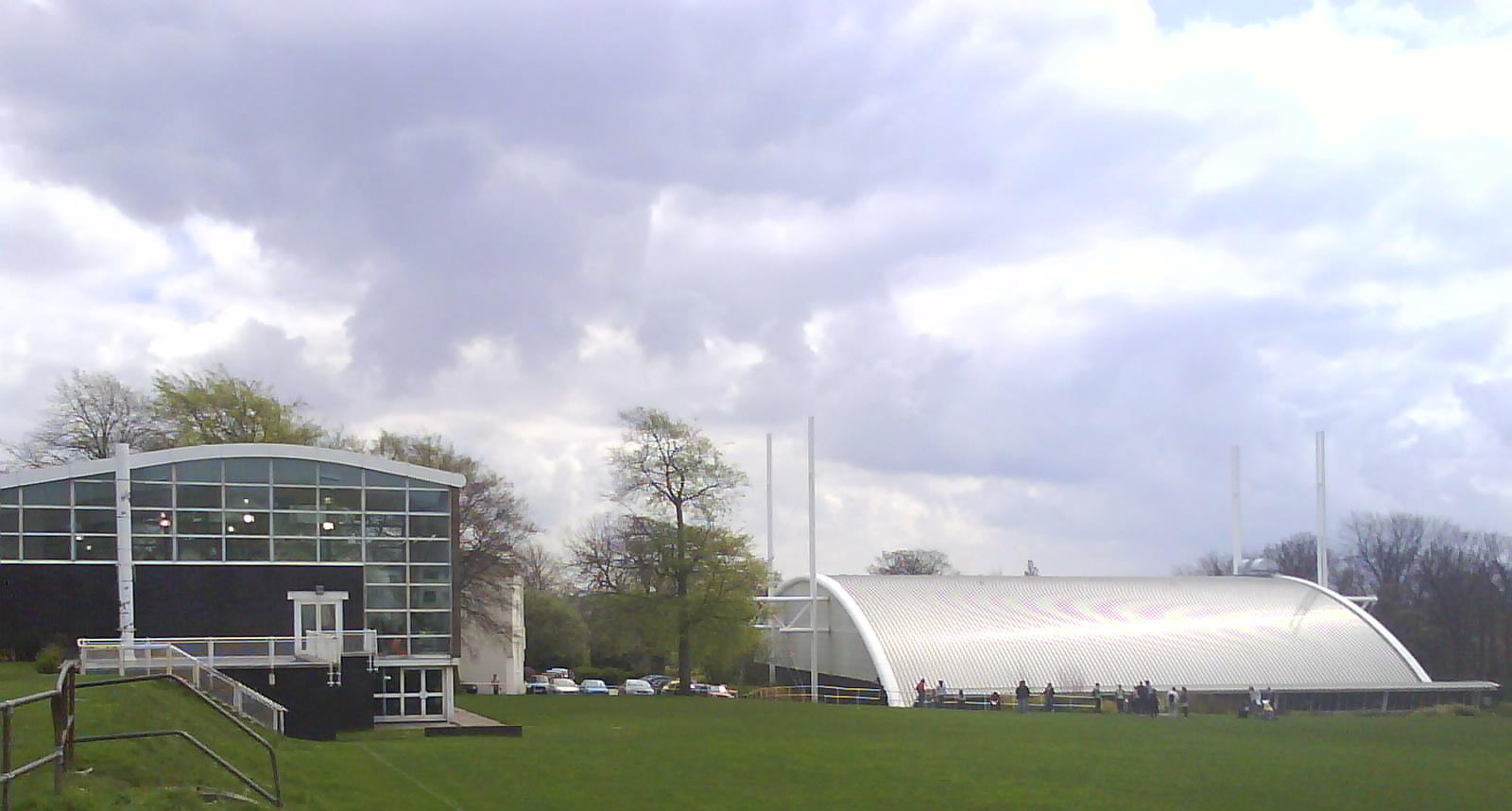
I. M. Marsh Campus' swimming pool and sports hall

Liverpool John Moores University has BUCS-registered teams in badminton, basketball, cricket, football, cycling, hockey, netball, rugby league, rugby union, tennis, volleyball, snowriders racers team, swimming, and American football. Many of the sports teams compete in BUCS competitions. Liverpool Students' Union has 15 BUCS sports, from which 36 teams run, catering for over 800 athletes. In recent years, LJMU students have competed for BUCS representative squads, in national finals and at World University Championships. In addition, the Students' Union also runs intramural sports leagues.

LJMU Fury, the university's American football team

The university also enjoys success at national and world level. Gymnast Beth Tweddle studied at LJMU and has achieved national, Commonwealth, European, and World medals whilst also competing at the Olympic Games.

Every year the university sports compete for 'The Varsity Cup' in the inter-university derby, Liverpool John Moores University Vs. University of Liverpool. The competing sports include: badminton, basketball, hockey, football, netball, volleyball, swimming, tennis, and the snowriders racing team.

== Notable alumni ==
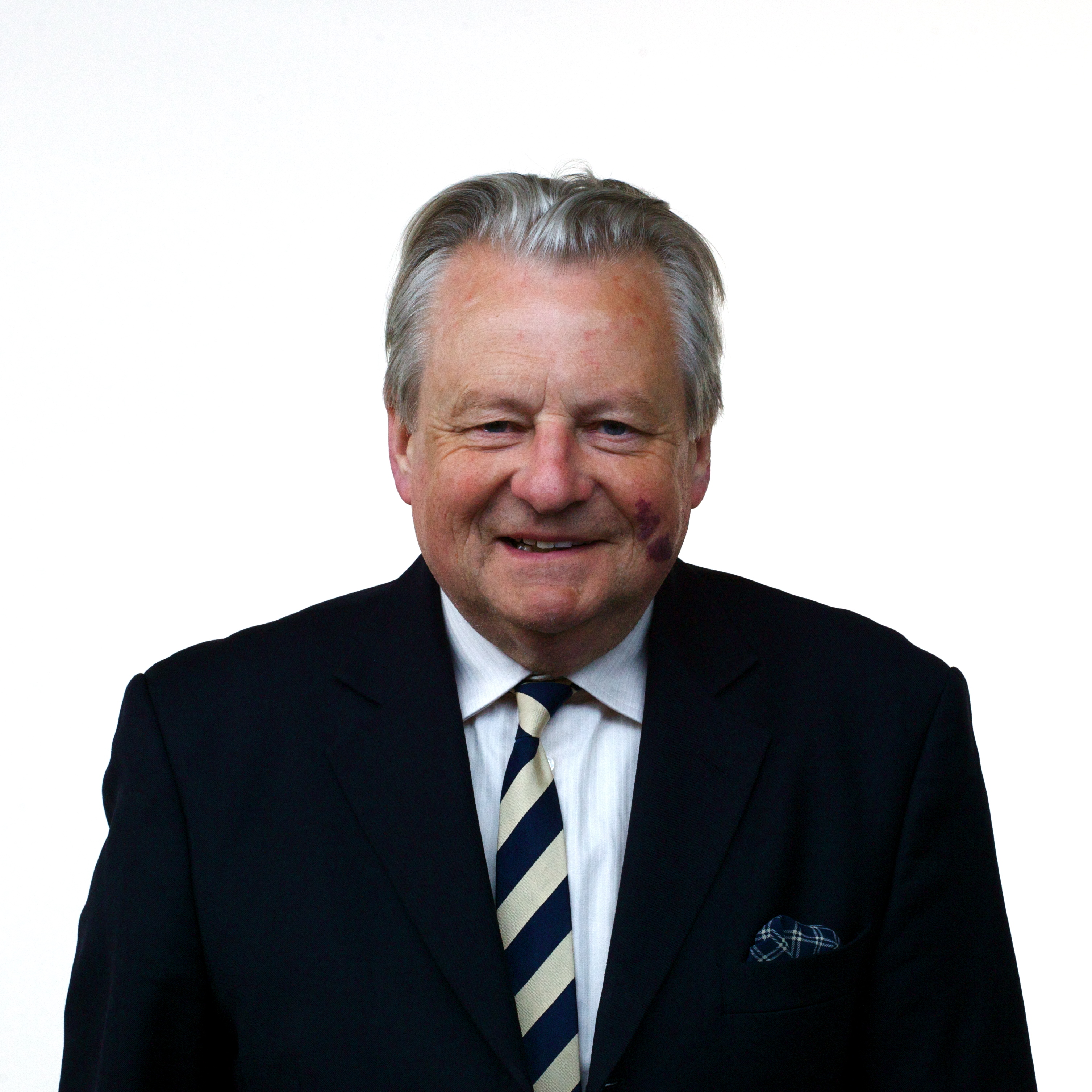
Baron Elis-Thomas, PC, MS, MP, 1st Presiding Officer of the Welsh Assembly, former MP and MS for the Meirionnydd.

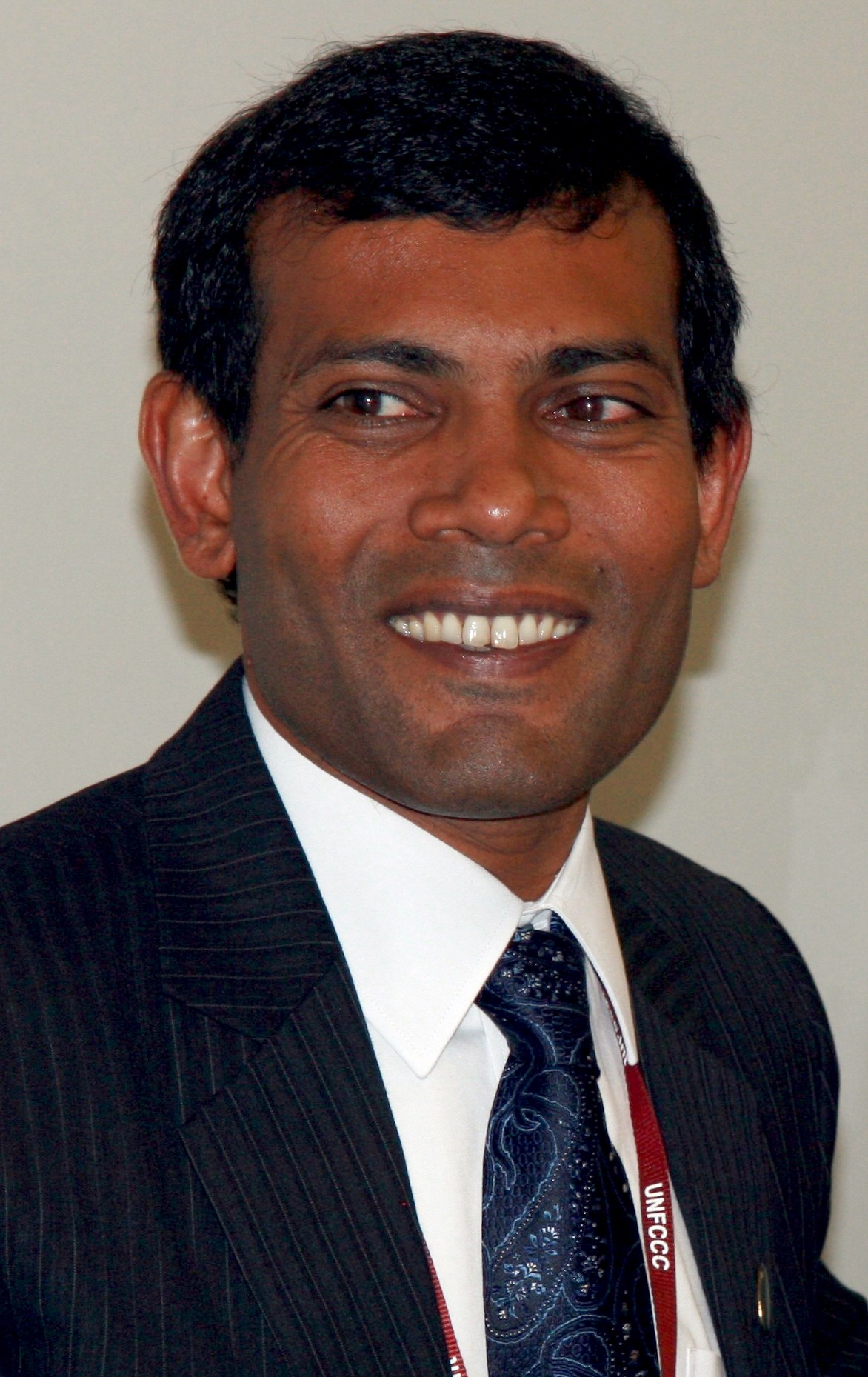
President Mohamed Nasheed, 4th President of the Maldives and climate justice activist.

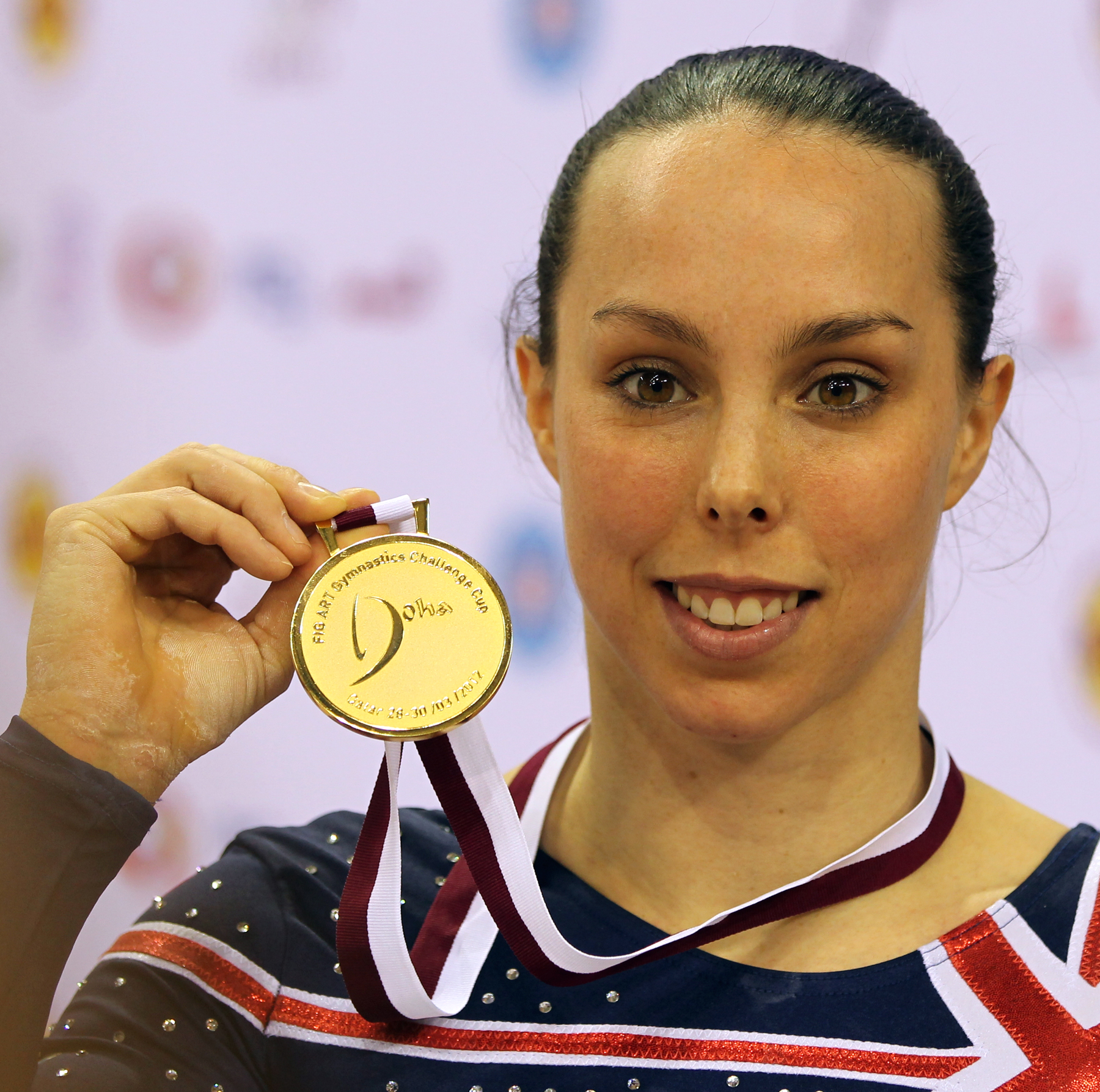
Beth Tweddle, three times Olympic Athlete

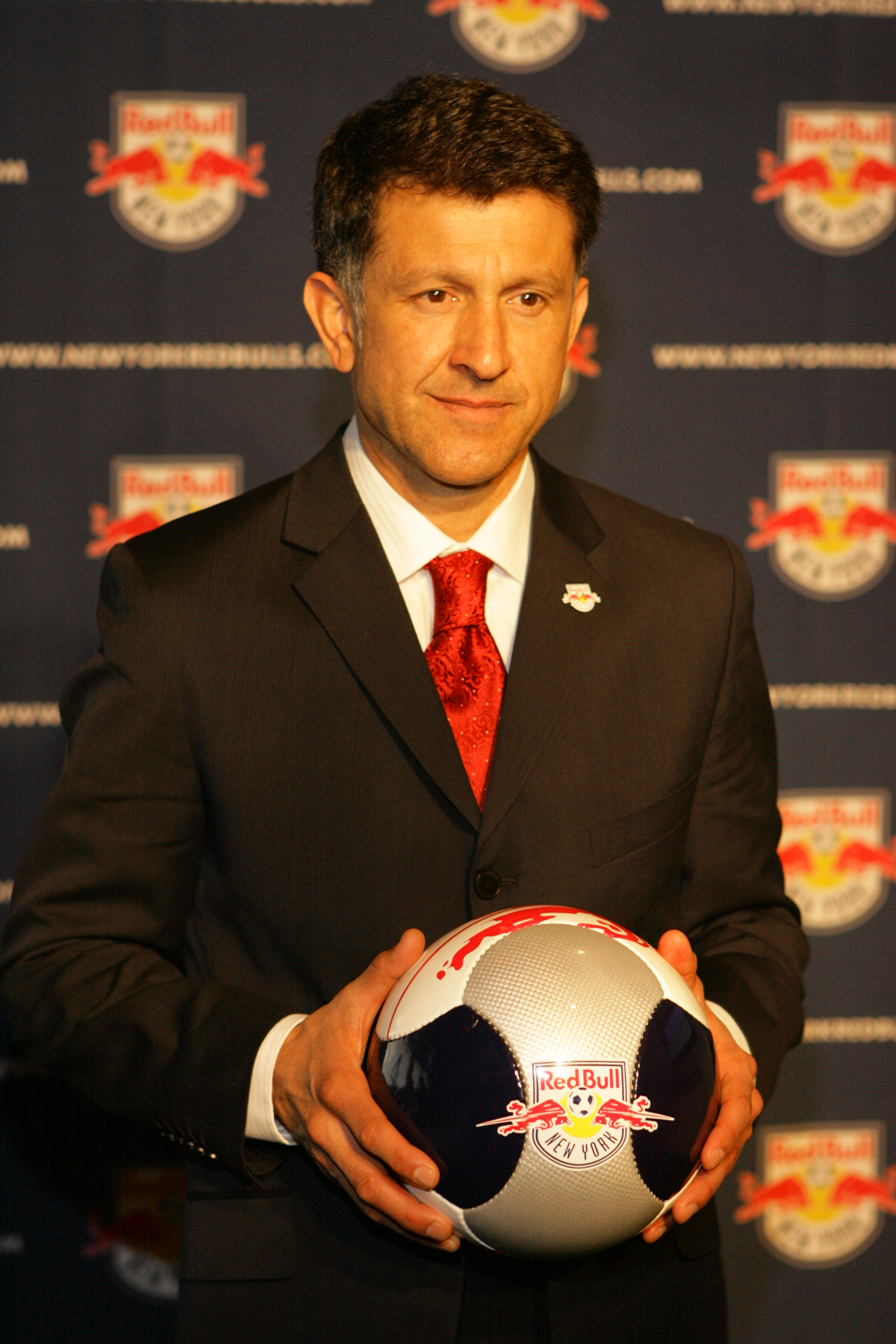
Juan Carlos Osorio, Colombian football manager

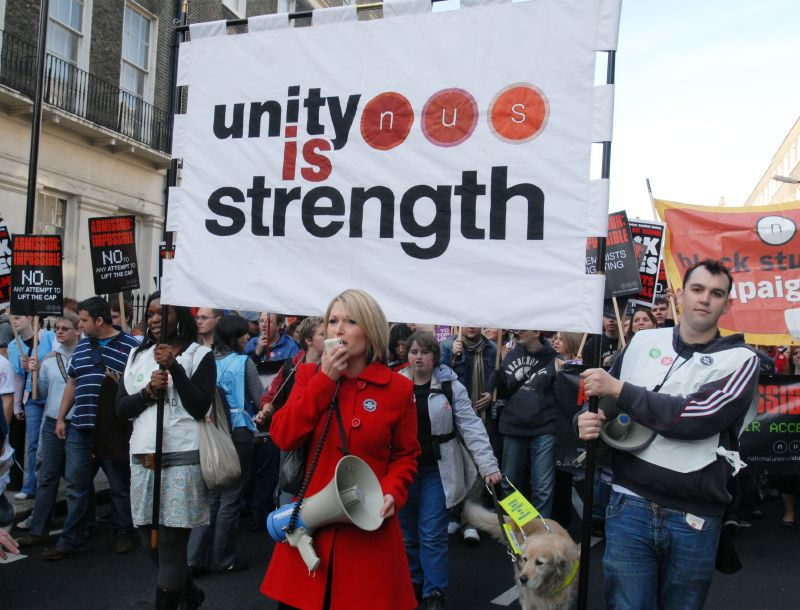
Gemma Tumelty,
52nd President of National Union of Students
- Caroline Aherne (actress, comedy writer, The Royle Family)
- Joe Anderson, former Mayor of Liverpool
- Jason Arday (controversial former academic and storyteller)
- Martyn Bernard (2010 European Athletics Championships bronze medalist high jumper)
- Rachel Brown (England women's national football team goalkeeper)
- Timothy Brown (musician, The Boo Radleys)
- Stephen Byers (MP)
- Bambos Charalambous (MP)
- Stephen Crowe, English composer
- Julian Cope (British musician, author)
- Dafydd Elis-Thomas, Baron Elis-Thomas (Welsh politician) (MS) (MP)
- Claire Foy (actress)
- Zack Gibson (professional wrestler)
- Neena Gill (MEP)
- Andreja Gomboc (astrophysicist)
- Mark Hendrick (MP)
- Christy Holly (Head Coach of Louisville Royals in the NWSL)
- George Howarth (MP)
- John Lennon (The Beatles)
- Matt Lloyd (Ice Sledge Hockey player)
- Andy Merrifield, Marxist urban theorist
- Steve Morgan, founder of Redrow plc
- Margaret Murphy (crime writer)
- Mohamed Nasheed (4th President of the Maldives)
- Martin Offiah, rugby league player
- Juan Carlos Osorio (football manager)
- Tom Palin (painter)
- Roxanne Pallett (actress, known from Emmerdale)
- Les Parry, English football manager
- Steve Parry (Olympic Games bronze medalist swimmer)
- Vicky Pattison (Geordie Shore Reality personality)
- Louise Pentland [Known online as 'Sprinkle of Glitter'] (YouTuber)
- Michael Rimmer (2010 European Athletics Championships silver medalist 800 m runner)
- Gareth Roberts (writer, Doctor Who and The Sarah Jane Adventures)
- James Roby (St Helens R.F.C. rugby player)
- Philip Selway (musician, Radiohead)
- Andrew Stunell (MP)
- Gemma Tumelty (52nd President of NUS)
- Beth Tweddle, Olympic medalist (gymnast)
- Andi Watson (cartoonist)
- Laura Watton (Original English-language manga artist)
- Hannah Whelan (gymnast)
- Ieuan Wyn Jones (Welsh politician) (MS) (MP)

== See also ==
- Armorial of UK universities
- List of universities in the UK
- Liverpool Knowledge Quarter
- Post-1992 universities
