= NCUK =

- Northern Consortium UK
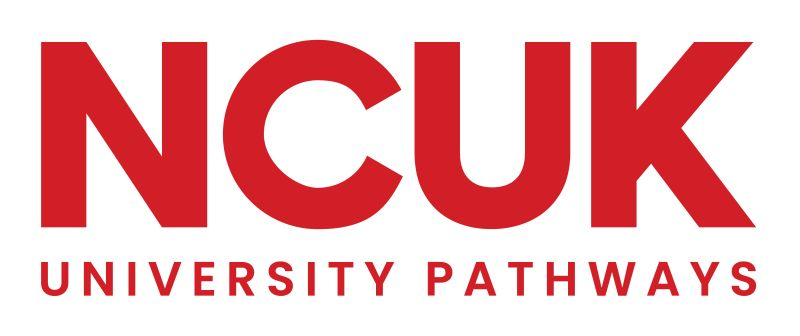
- Formation: 1987
- Founder: Group of Northern UK universities
- Type: Non-profit educational consortium
- Headquarters: Manchester, United Kingdom
- Region served: Worldwide
- Members: Over 60 university partners
- Chief Executive Officer: Stuart Smith
- Award: King's Award for Enterprise (2026)
- Website: www.ncuk.ac.uk

NCUK (also known as NCUK - University Pathways) is an international awarding body and examination board that designs, assesses, and regulates pre-university qualifications for international students. Its flagship program, the International Foundation Year (IFY), is a regulated Level 3 qualification officially benchmarked by UK ENIC as equivalent to GCE A Levels. Operating under a standardized exam-board model, the organization administers academic curriculum standards and language testing to award students matriculation pathways into partner universities globally. The organisation's main office is located in Manchester, UK, with key staff members located in Asian regions, including China.

NCUK describes itself as an organisation offering a variety of qualifications, supporting the academic and university progressions of students worldwide. Recognised by universities within the NCUK Global Network and beyond, the successful completion of an NCUK programme grants students access to over 60 NCUK University Partners, providing them with options to progress to universities in the UK, Australia, New Zealand, the USA, and Canada.

== History ==
1987: The Northern Consortium was formed by a group of 12 universities and was based at The University of Manchester Institute of Science and Technology (UMIST)

Founding Universities:

- Victoria University of Manchester
- University of Manchester Institute of Science and Technology
- The University of Bradford
- The University of Huddersfield
- The University of Leeds
- The University of Sheffield
- The University of Liverpool
- The University of Salford
- Liverpool John Moores University
- Manchester Metropolitan University
- Leeds Beckett University
- Sheffield Hallam University

Late 1980s and early 1990s: The Northern Consortium was established as a charity to professionalize international education, particularly focusing on transnational education opportunities in Malaysia.

The international offices of 12 universities in 1987, who collaborated to design and deliver a split degree program for Malaysian government-sponsored students, were the founders of The Northern Consortium. The Malaysian economy – engineering, computing, pharmacy and business – was aided through the Consortium's developed programs, also dubbed ‘transfer’ programs. Students would study for one year in Malaysia, before transferring to one of NCUK's founding universities, or to other UK institutions.

Throughout the project's 10-year span over 6,000 students have progressed through the programs and into UK institutions, saving the Malaysian government from significant costs in their sponsorship budget.

Late 1990s: They entered the Chinese market, with the International Foundation Program being introduced in the process. NCUK was among the first to offer such qualifications in China, earlier than the leading organizations A Levels and International Baccalaureate.

1999: A joint venture was initiated with ACE to develop a nationwide initiative in China, focused on the International Foundation Year.

China's first international department at Chengdu No. 7 High School was established, which was followed by the setup of international departments in 14 other middle schools across China.

Early 2000s: Operations expanded primarily along the Eastern Seaboard of China, including cities such as Beijing, Chengdu, Chongqing, Qingdao, and Dalian.

2003: NCUK Ltd was formed as the commercial arm to enter new markets and form new partnerships, driving profits for the charity.

2004/05: An innovative partnership was formed with nine universities of the Northern Consortium and the University of Shanghai for Science and Technology (USST) to create the Sino-British College, a pioneering initiative in the market.

== Programmes ==
=== International Foundation Year (IFY) ===
Targeted for secondary school leavers, the IFY provides students with a year-long English Language and pre-university course. The UK ENIC (European Network of Information Centres) recognizes the NCUK International Foundation Year as comparable to the levels of the GCE A Levels, Australian high school (SSCE), American high school (AP), and Hong Kong high school (HKDSE) qualifications. Completion of the IFY provides direct entry to the first year of a bachelor's degree.

Students have the option to choose from thirteen subject modules and may select any combination of three modules to study:

- Mathematics for Business
- Chemistry
- Global Studies
- Mathematics for Engineering
- Physics
- Society and Politics
- Mathematics for Science
- Business Studies
- Art and Design
- Further Mathematics
- Economics
- Computer Science
- Biology

The IFY offers students the necessary academic preparation for tertiary study.

=== International Year One (IYOne) ===
Students undertake a credit-bearing qualification equivalent to the first year of a bachelor's degree. Completion provides direct entry to the second year of a bachelor's degree at a university of their choice.

The five qualification subject areas in this program are:

- Accounting and Finance
- Business Management
- Electrical & Electronic
- Engineering
- Events Management
- Law

=== International Year Two (IYTwo) ===
Students complete a qualification equivalent to the second year of a Bachelor's Degree in Business Management. Completion provides direct progression into the third year of a UK university. 15 UK universities accept this program.

=== Master's Preparation (MP) ===
This qualification is designed to prepare students for post-graduate academic study.

== NCUK Global Network ==
The NCUK Global Network includes partnerships with 60+ universities in the UK, USA, Canada, Australia, and New Zealand as well with 110+ Study Centres in 40+ countries.

=== Study Centres ===
NCUK programmes are delivered in various Study Centres across the world. The list below shows 40 countries where the Study Centres are located:

Algeria; Azerbaijan; Bahrain; Bangladesh; British Virgin Islands; China; Cyprus; Egypt; Ethiopia; Ghana; Hong Kong SAR; India; Indonesia; Ireland	Japan; Kazakhstan; Kenya; Madagascar; Malaysia; Malta; Morocco; Myanmar; Nigeria; Oman; Pakistan; Peru; Qatar (University Foundation College); Saudi Arabia	Singapore (EAIM); South Africa; South Korea; Sri Lanka; Taiwan; Thailand; Tunisia; Turkey; United Arab Emirates; United Kingdom; USA; Vietnam

=== University Partners ===
After successfully completing their programme, students are granted access to the NCUK University Partners. Below is a list of all the universities to which students have the option of entering:

- University of Alberta
- Aston University
- University of Auckland
- University of Birmingham
- University of Bradford
- University of Bristol
- Brunel University of London
- Brunel Pathway College
- University of Canterbury, New Zealand
- Cardiff University
- Durham University
- University of Exeter
- University of Huddersfield
- Keele University
- University of Kent
- Kingston University
- Leeds Beckett University
- Lancaster University
- University of Leeds
- Liverpool Hope University
- Liverpool John Moores University
- University of Liverpool
- The University of Manchester
- Manchester Metropolitan University
- Oxford Brookes University
- Queen Mary University of London
- Queen's University Belfast
- Sheffield Hallam University
- University of Salford
- The University of Sheffield
- Swansea University
- The University of Sussex
- St. George's University, Grenada
- University of Central Lancashire
- The University of New South Wales (UNSW Sydney)
- University of Western Australia
- University of South Australia
- Swinburne University of Technology
- Robert Gordon University
- University of Southampton, Malaysia
- RMIT University
- Harper Adams University
- State University of New York at Oswego
- University of Waikato
- Massey University of New Zealand
- Auckland University of Technology
- Victoria University of Wellington
- University of Lincoln
- University of Otago
- California State University, Monterey Bay
- University of Newcastle, Australia
- De Montfort University
- University of Reading
- University of York
- University of Westminster
- University of West of England

== Awards and recognitions ==
- In 2021, NCUK was named the winner of the Digital Innovation of the Year – Assessment and Credentials award at the fifth iteration of the PIEoneer Awards 2021
- Shortlisted as a finalist for Global Education Investor's Pathway Company of the Year 2021
- Shortlisted for the PIEoneer Awards 2023, for the 'Championing Diversity, Equity, and Inclusion' award
- Shortlisted in the International Student Recruitment Organisation of the Year category at the PIEoneer Awards 2024
