= William Brown Library and Museum =

Listed building in Liverpool, England

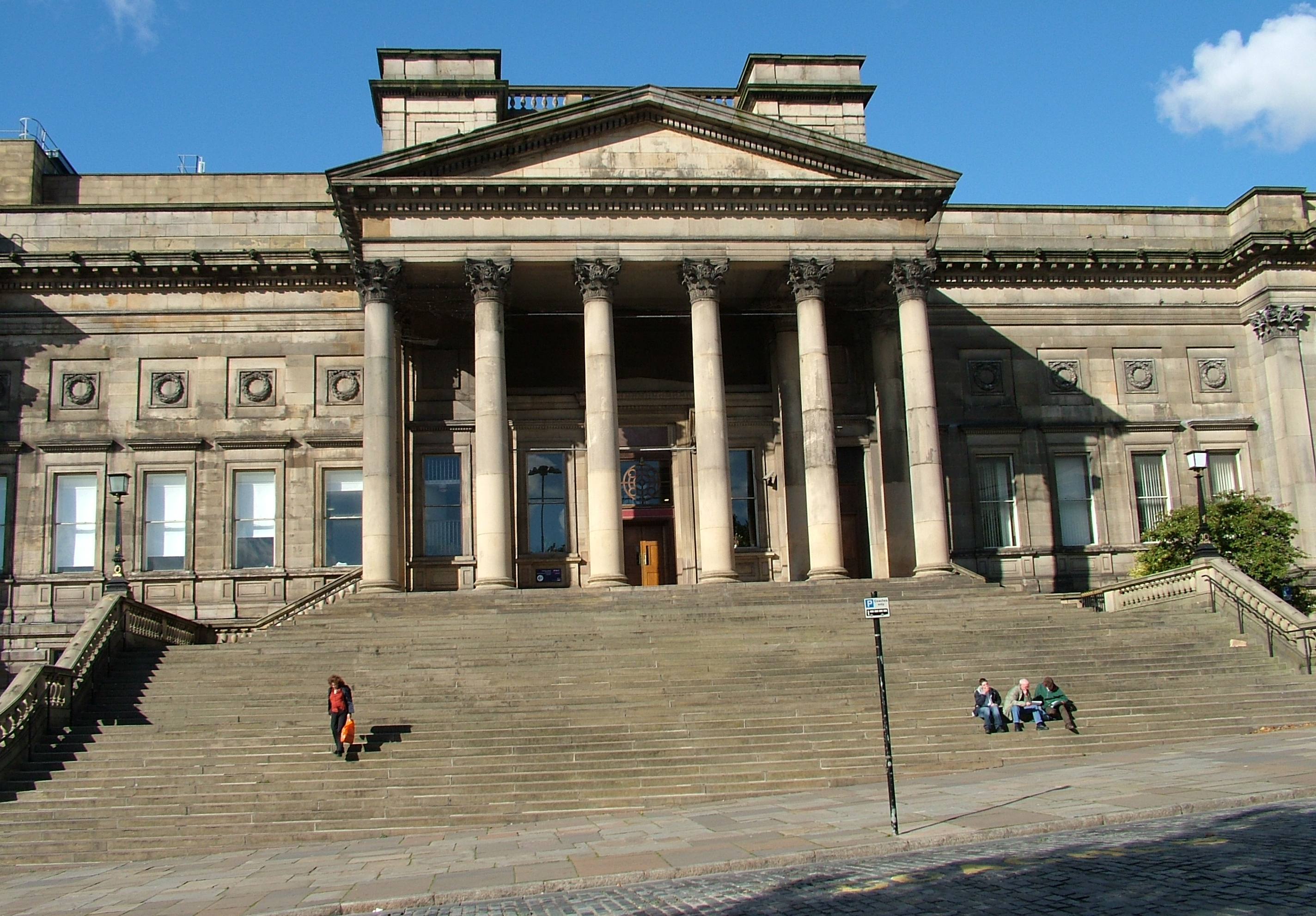
- Main entrance to the building
- Interactive map of the William Brown Library and Museum area

General information
- Location: William Brown Street, Liverpool, England
- Coordinates: 53.40979°N 2.98118°W
- Year built: 1857–60

Design and construction
- Architects: Thomas Allom; John Weightman (modified)
- Designations

Listed Building – Grade II*
- Official name: William Brown Library and Museum
- Designated: 28 June 1952
- Reference no.: 1063781

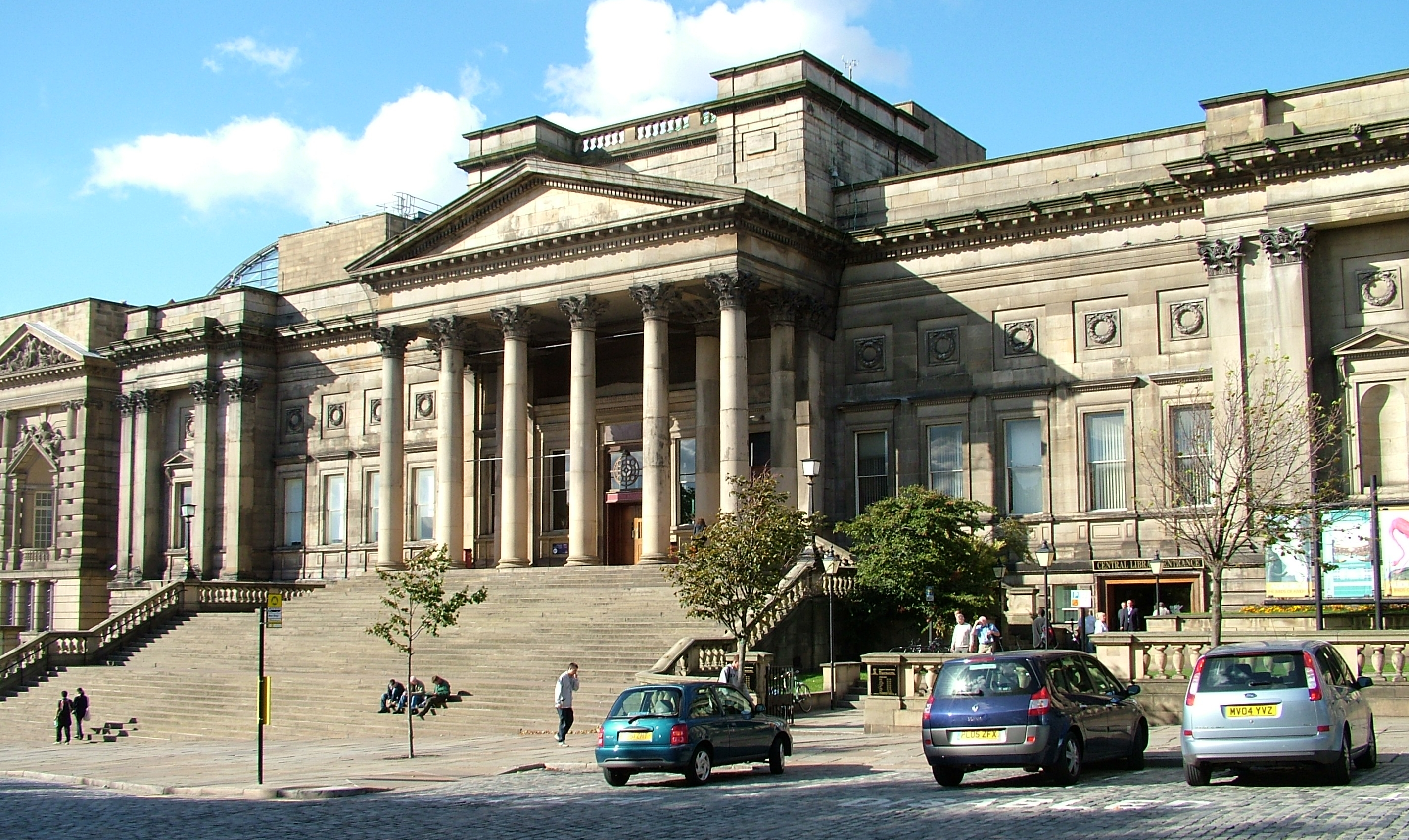
Main entrance to the building and, to the right, the ground-level entrance to Liverpool Central Library

Liverpool Library and Museum Act 1852
- Act of Parliament
- Parliament of the United Kingdom
- Long title: An Act for establishing a Public Library, Museum, and Gallery of Arts at Liverpool, and to make Provision for the Reception of a Collection of Specimens illustrative of Natural History presented by the Earl of Derby for the Benefit of the Inhabitants of the Borough of Liverpool and the Neighbourhood thereof, and others resorting thereto.
- Citation: 15 & 16 Vict. c. iii

Dates
- Royal assent: 3 May 1852

Other legislation
- Repealed by: Liverpool Corporation Act 1921

Status: Repealed

Text of statute as originally enacted

The William Brown Library and Museum is a Grade II* listed building situated on the historic William Brown Street in Liverpool, England. The building currently houses part of the World Museum Liverpool and Liverpool Central Library.

== History ==
The William Brown Library and Museum building was conceived as a replacement for the Derby Museum (containing the Earl of Derby's natural history collection) which then shared two rooms on the city's Duke Street with a library. The land for the building on what was then called Shaw's Brow, as well as much of the funding, was provided by local MP and merchant Sir William Brown, 1st Baronet of Astrop, in whose honour the street was renamed.

Following on from the then-recently completed St George's Hall across the street, the new building was designed by Thomas Allom in a classical style including Corinthian columns and was modified by the Liverpool Corporation architect John Weightman. The new building opened its doors in 1860 with 400,000 people attending the opening ceremony.

With Liverpool being one of the country's key ports, much of the city was badly damaged by German bombing during the Second World War and William Brown Library and Museum were no exception. Hit by firebombs during the blitz in 1941, the building was ravaged by fire and much of the building had to be rebuilt. Key parts of the museum's collection had been previously moved to less vulnerable locations and damage to those avoided.

In 2008 plans were brought forward to redevelop the library, replacing the post-World War II additions with state-of-the-art facilities.

== See also ==
- Architecture of Liverpool
- Grade II* listed buildings in Liverpool – City Centre
- List of libraries in Liverpool
