= Harold Cohen Library, University of Liverpool =

Main library of the University of Liverpool

Coordinates: 53.406°N 2.967°W

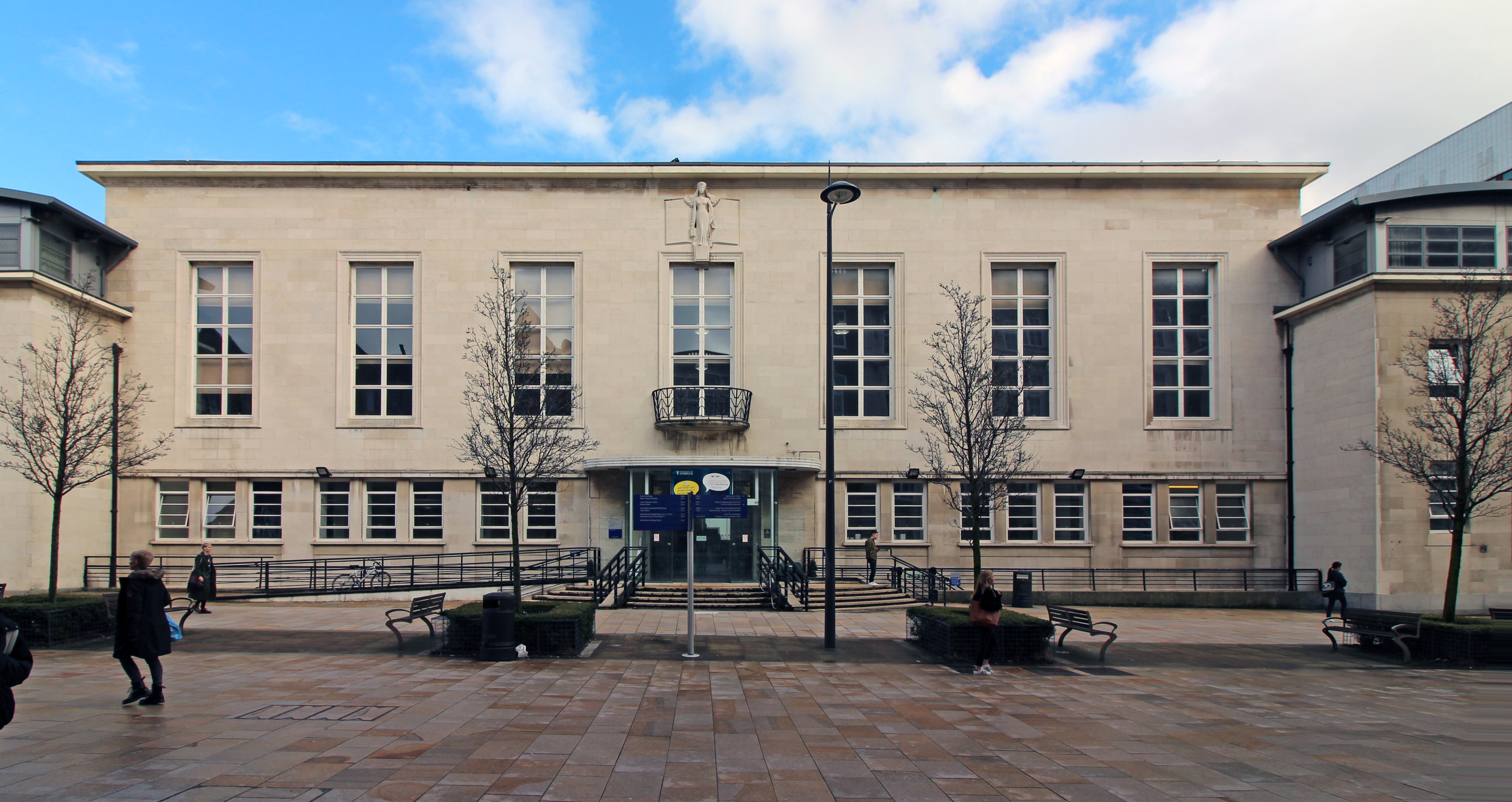
Harold Cohen Library

The Harold Cohen Library is the University of Liverpool's library on the north part of the city centre campus. Its resources cater for students studying within the Faculty of Science & Engineering and the Faculty of Health & Life Sciences, which includes the medical, dental and veterinary science courses. It also contains eight computer centres as well as the Wolfson training suite.

== Inception ==
The library was funded by a donation of £100,000 from Harold Cohen, chairman of Lewis's department store and the son of a former Lord Mayor of Liverpool. It was opened on 21 May 1938, in the presence of the Prime Minister Stanley Baldwin. Harold Cohen died suddenly, in 1936 on the day he was to lay the building's foundation stone and also be conferred with the honorary degree of Doctor of Laws. He was awarded the degree posthumously, the only posthumous award of an honorary degree in the history of the University.

The library's architect was Harold Dod. The frontage on Ashton Street, Liverpool is of Portland stone. It is a Grade II listed building, and features a statue over the entrance entitled 'Learning' by Eric Kennington, also of Portland stone, which depicts a female figure holding a lamp and key in front of an open book.

The library contained 200,000 volumes when opened, but this has now increased to over 500,000, on 12 miles of shelving. Similarly the staffing has increased from 15 to 110. It is a member of the Libraries Together: Liverpool Learning Partnership (evolved from Liverpool Libraries Group) which formed in 1990. Under which, a registered reader at any of the member libraries can have access rights to the other libraries within the partnership.

== See also ==
- Grade II listed buildings in Liverpool-L3
- List of libraries in Liverpool
