= List of libraries in Liverpool =

This is a list of libraries in Liverpool, England, United Kingdom. It includes research libraries, public libraries, and other types. Some continue to operate while others have ceased or merged into other organizations.

== Libraries ==
- Allerton Library
- Architectural Society Library
- Balfour Institute library
- Breck Road Library
- Childwall Library
- Croxteth Library
- Dovecot Library
- Fazakerley Library
- Garston Library
- Geographical Society Library
- Historic Society of Lancashire and Cheshire library
- Kensington Library
- Law Society library
- Lee Valley Library
- Lister Drive Library, 1905–2006
- Liverpool Athenaeum
- Liverpool Cathedral library
- Liverpool Central Library
- Liverpool Community College library
- Liverpool Farmers' Library
- Liverpool Female Apprentice's Library
- Liverpool Free Public Library, opened in 1852
- Liverpool Hope University library
- Liverpool Institute for Performing Arts library
- Liverpool John Moores University
  - Aldham Robarts Library
  - Avril Robarts Library
- Liverpool Library, 1758-1941
- Liverpool Literary & Philosophical Society library
- Liverpool Philomathic Society library
- Liverpool Medical Institution library
- Liverpool School of Tropical Medicine library
- Liverpool Seamens' Library
- Liverpool Technical Library, Liverpool College of Technology
- The Lyceum, Liverpool, subscription library, 1758–1942
- Merseyside Maritime Museum library
- Microscopical Society Library
- Norris Green Library
- North Library
- Old Swan Library
- Parklands Library
- Picton Reading Room and Hornby Library
- Polytechnic Society Library
- Sefton Park Library
- Spellow Library
- Toxteth Public Library
- University of Liverpool Libraries
  - Harold Cohen Library, University of Liverpool
  - Sydney Jones Library
- Walton Library, Liverpool
- Wavertree District Library
- West Derby Library
- William Brown Library and Museum

== See also ==
- List of libraries in the United Kingdom
