= Liverpool Central Library =

Public Library in Liverpool, England

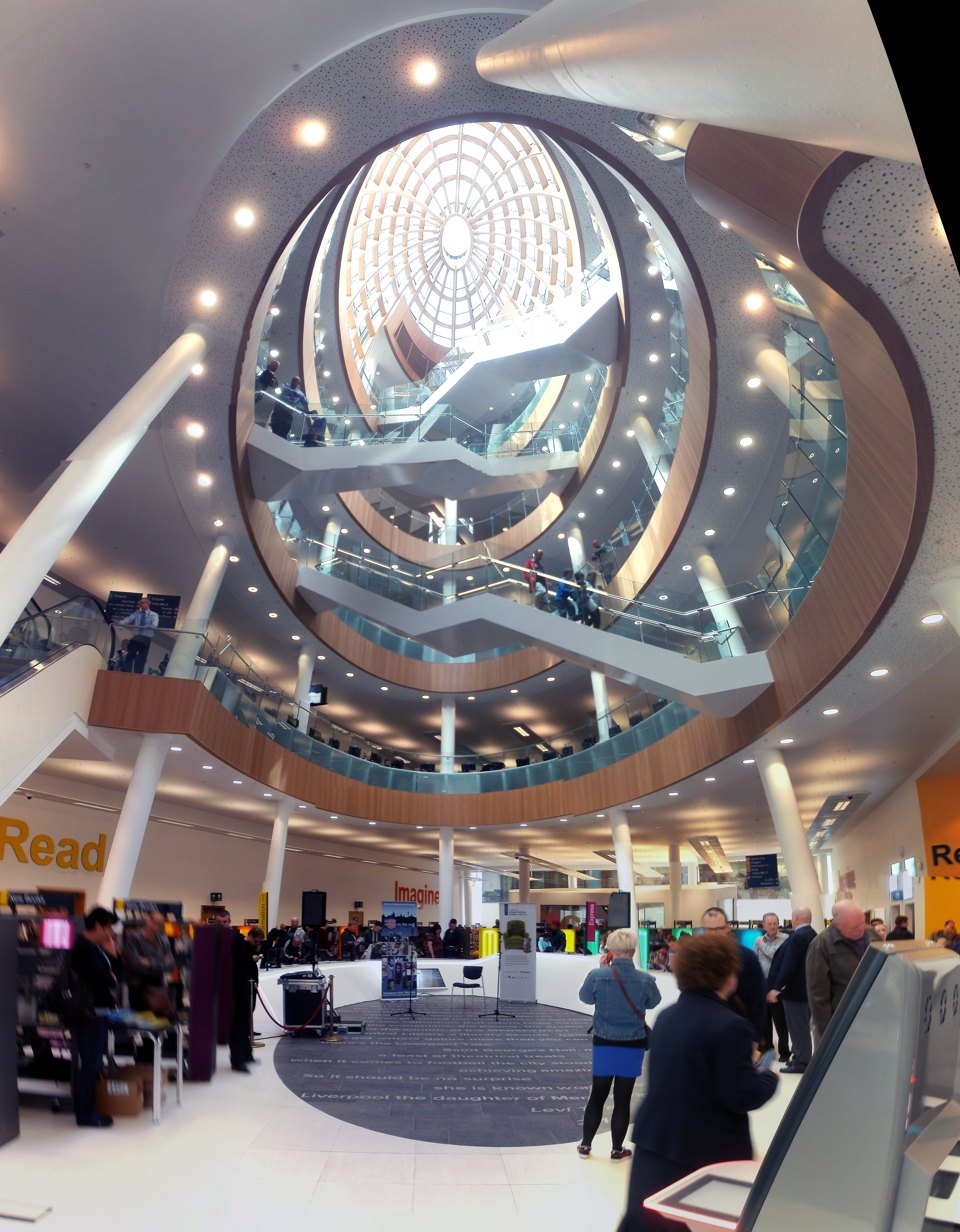
- 53°24′35.28″N 02°58′50.52″W
- Location: United Kingdom
- Established: 1860

Other information
- Website: http://liverpool.gov.uk/libraries/find-a-library/central-library

Liverpool Central Library is the largest of the 22 libraries in Liverpool, England, situated in the centre of the city.

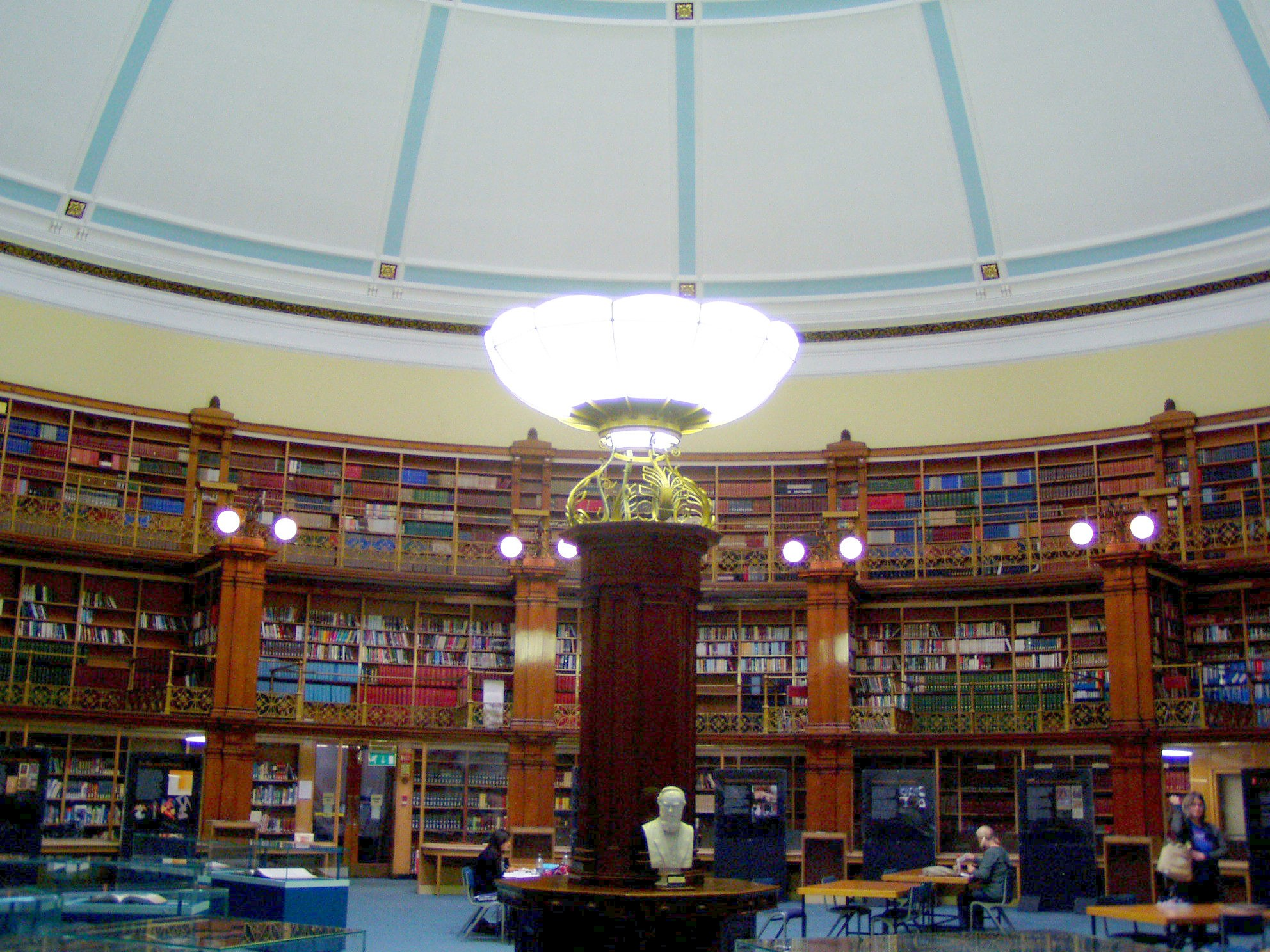
Picton Reading Room, an annex of the library itself

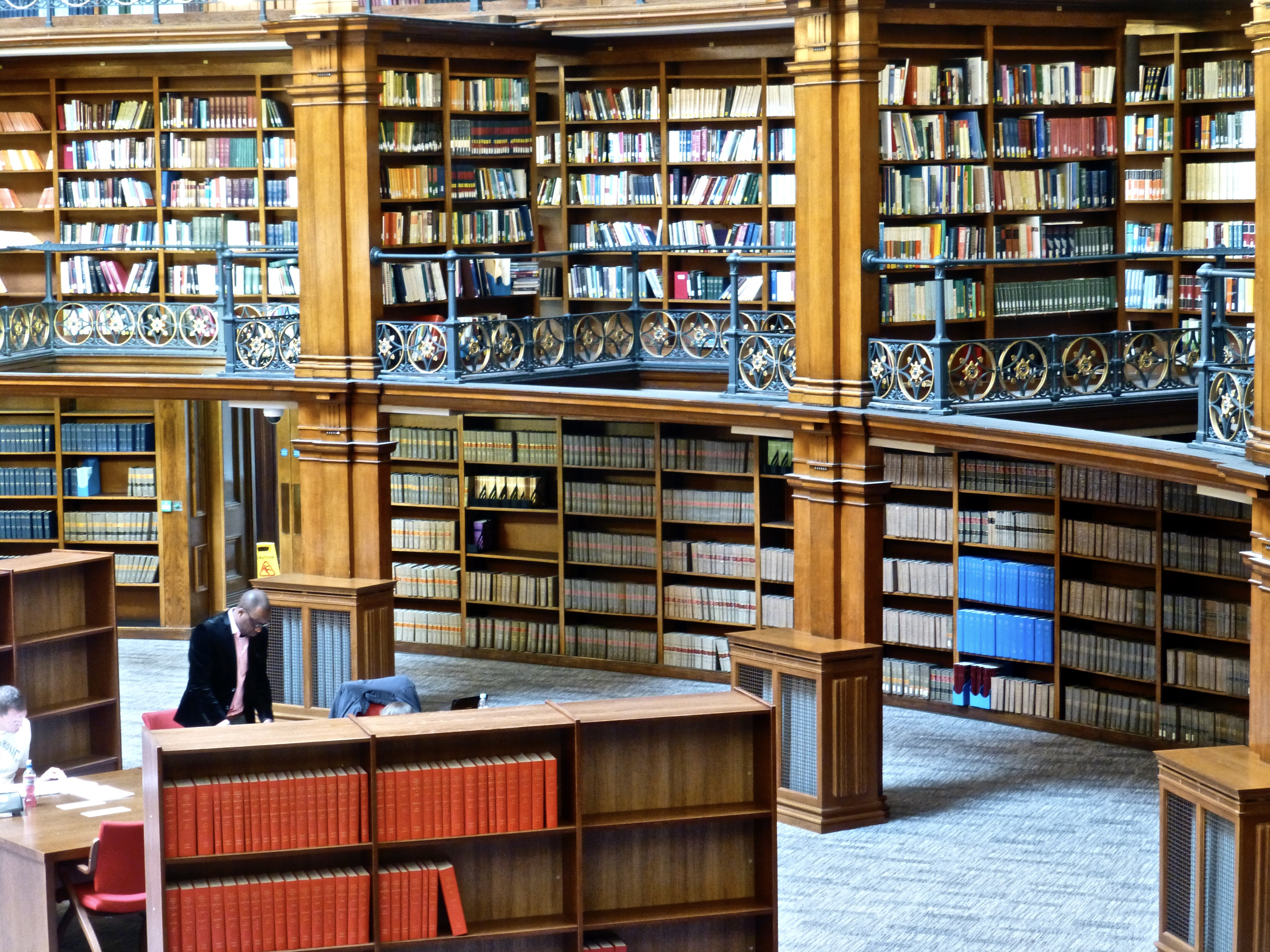
Another angle of the Picton Reading Room

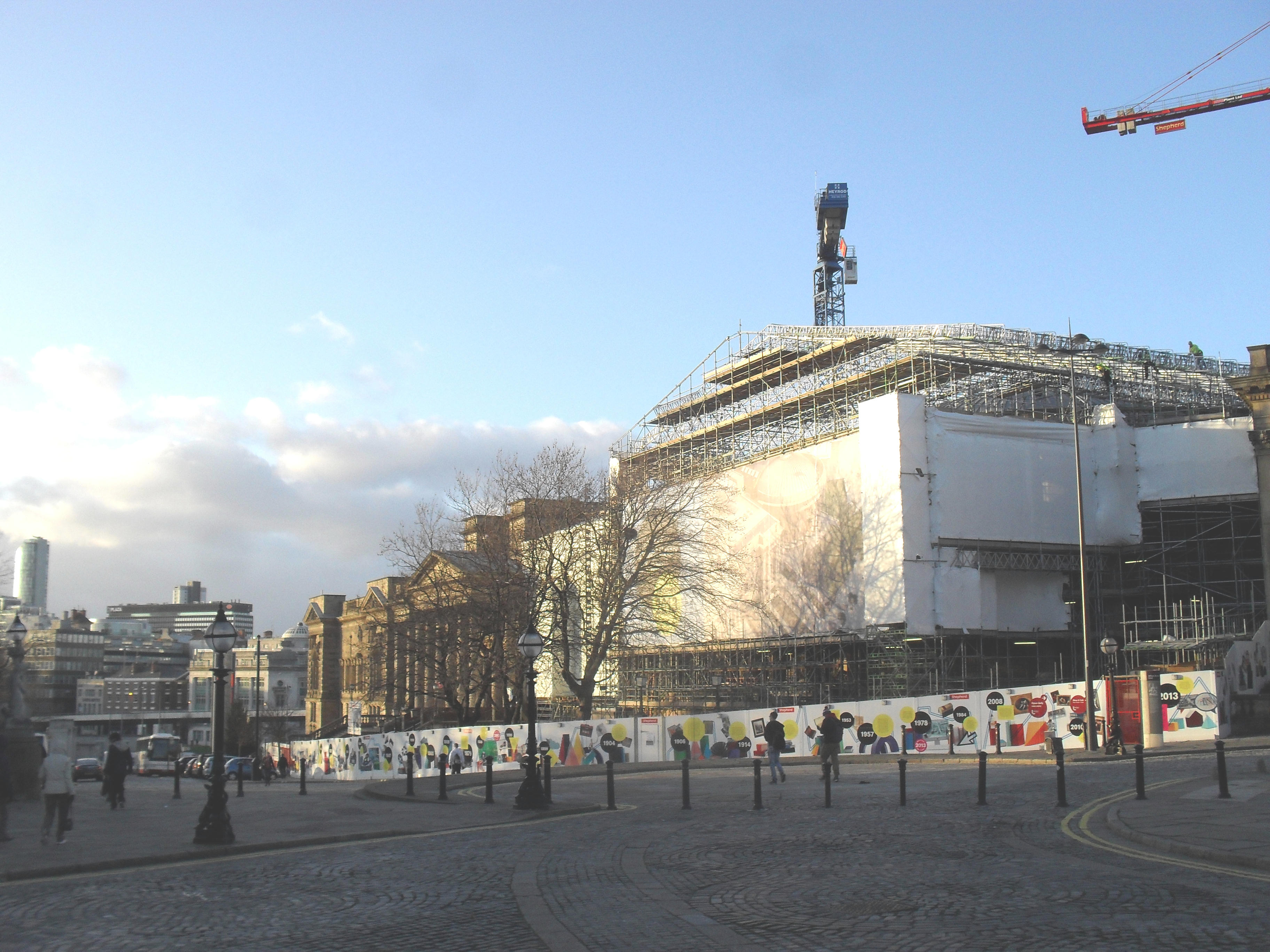
Liverpool Central Library during rebuild

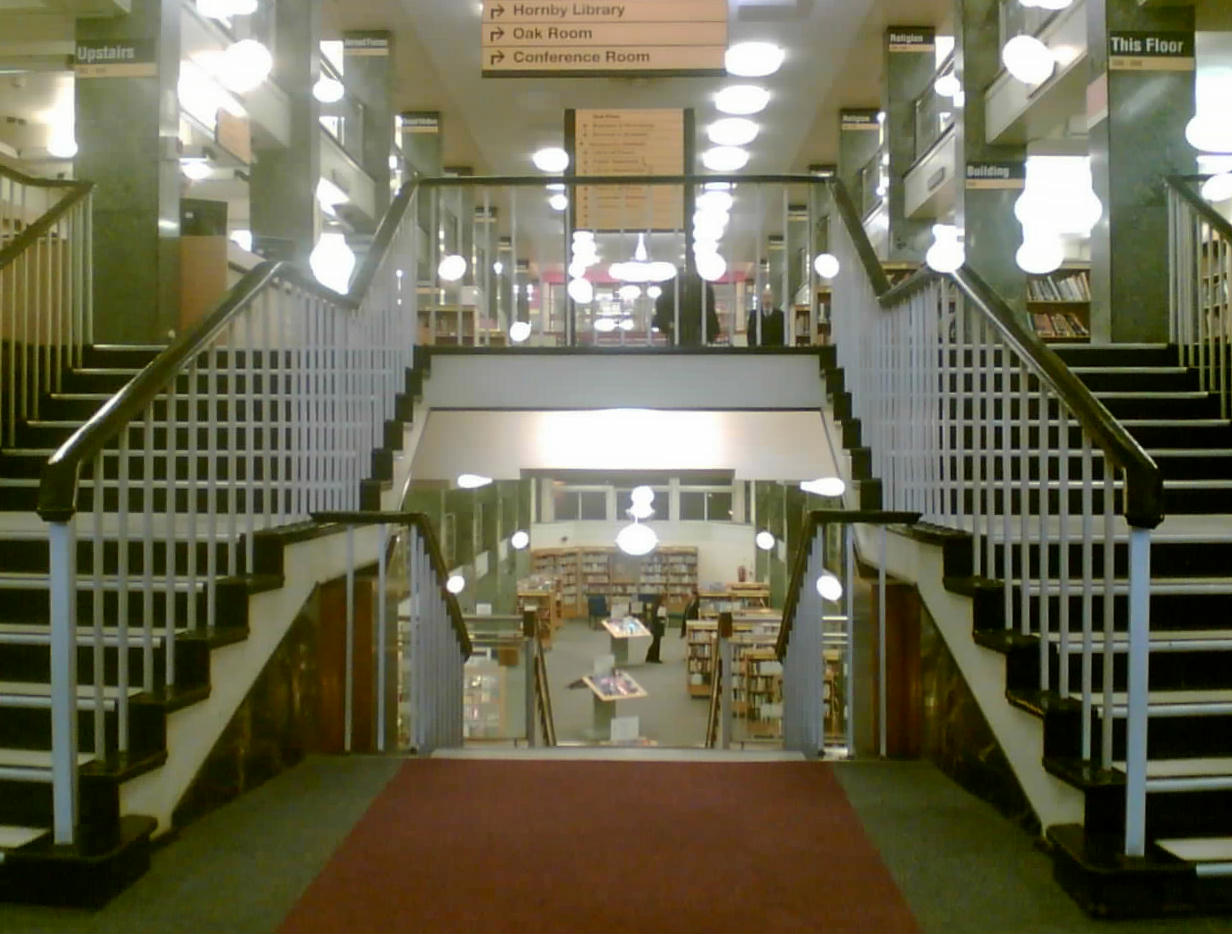
Interior view of the library prior to its 2013 refurbishment

== History ==
The library is located in several adjoining historic buildings on William Brown Street. Its first building was the William Brown Library and Museum building which was completed in 1860 to the designs of John Weightman Surveyor to Liverpool Corporation, (not to be confused with his near contemporary John Grey Weightman) and which it has always shared with the city's museum, now known as World Museum Liverpool. The library was then extended further to the right with the addition in 1879 of the Picton Reading Room and to the rear with the Hornby Library in 1906. All three of these are Grade II* listed buildings and are built in a classical style similar to other buildings on the street.

Previous to the creation of this public library was England's first subscription library (1758–1942), latterly known as The Lyceum, Liverpool, but often referred to as the Liverpool Library.

750,000 people visited the museum in 2017. In 2018, the library won The Bookseller’s Library of the Year Award.

== Rebuilding ==
In May 2008 it was announced that some of the complex of buildings that hold the Central Library were to be demolished and replaced with modern buildings suitable for use with modern IT services. The historic buildings in the complex would be refurbished to provide modern facilities and was designed by the Architects Austin-Smith:Lord. In October 2009 the proposed rebuild was shown to the public.

The main library building on William Brown Street closed on 23 July 2010, while closed, a temporary service operated from next door, on the second floor of Liverpool World Museum. The refurbished building features a central atrium, with a series of open-plan floors. The atrium is topped with a glass dome, and the building has a roof terrace, with views out over the city centre. It re-opened to the public on Friday 17 May 2013. At the entrance to the library is a 72 foot granite walkway, inlaid with the titles of literary classics. The titles contain a riddle, a series of letters picked out in red which spell out the title of a small but eye-catching item in the library's collection. The riddle was included to provoke the interest of visitors, and was presented as a competition at the museum's re-opening. 500 people took part, with 200 solving the riddle, and three winners were chosen in October 2013, five months after opening. The library has not revealed the answer to the riddle, in order to preserve the puzzle for future visitors.

== Library group ==
It is a member of the Libraries Together: Liverpool Learning Partnership (evolved from Liverpool Libraries Group) which formed in 1990. Under which, a registered reader at any of the member libraries can have access rights to the other libraries within the partnership.

== Gallery ==
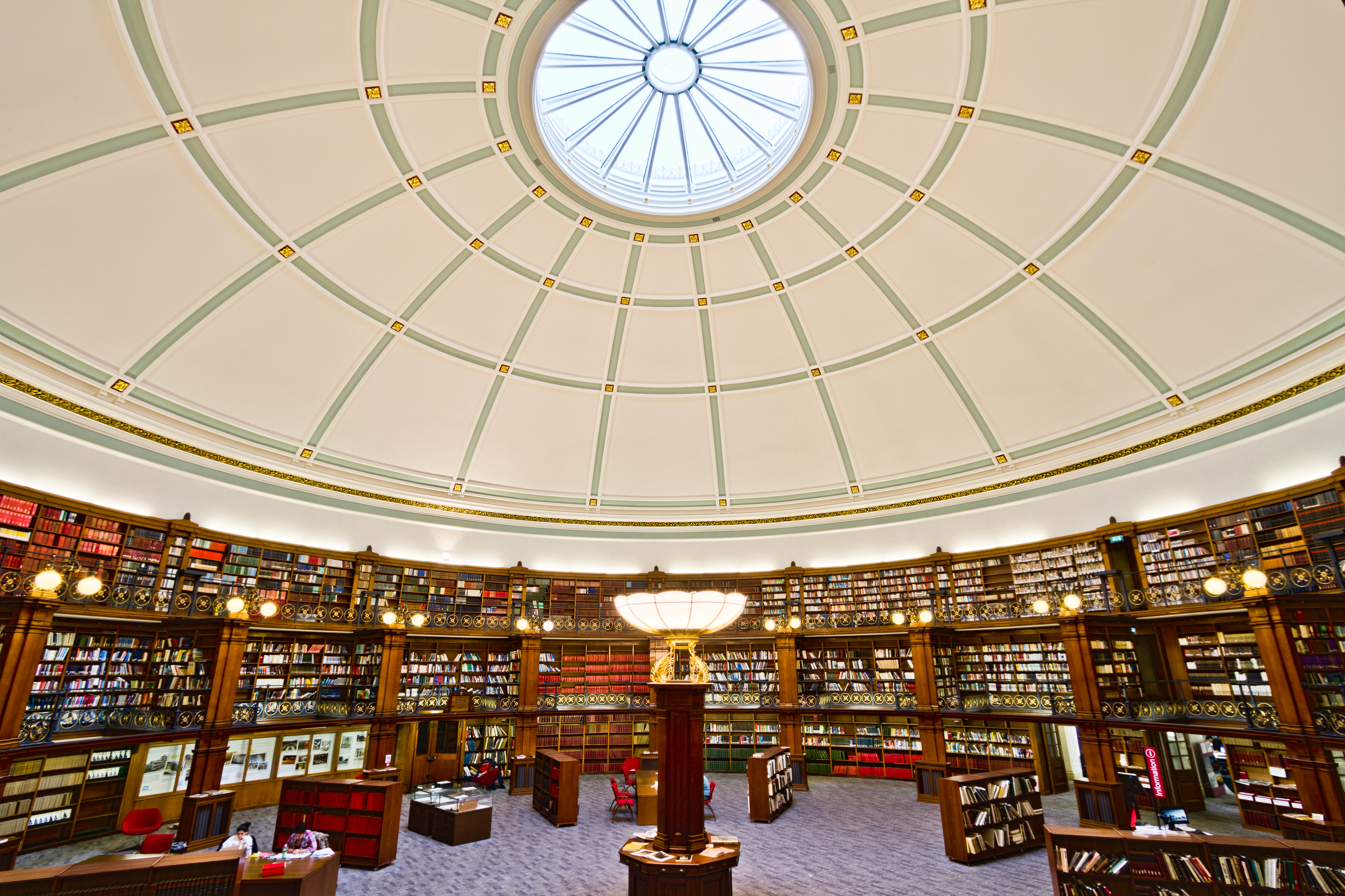
The Picton Reading Room inside the library

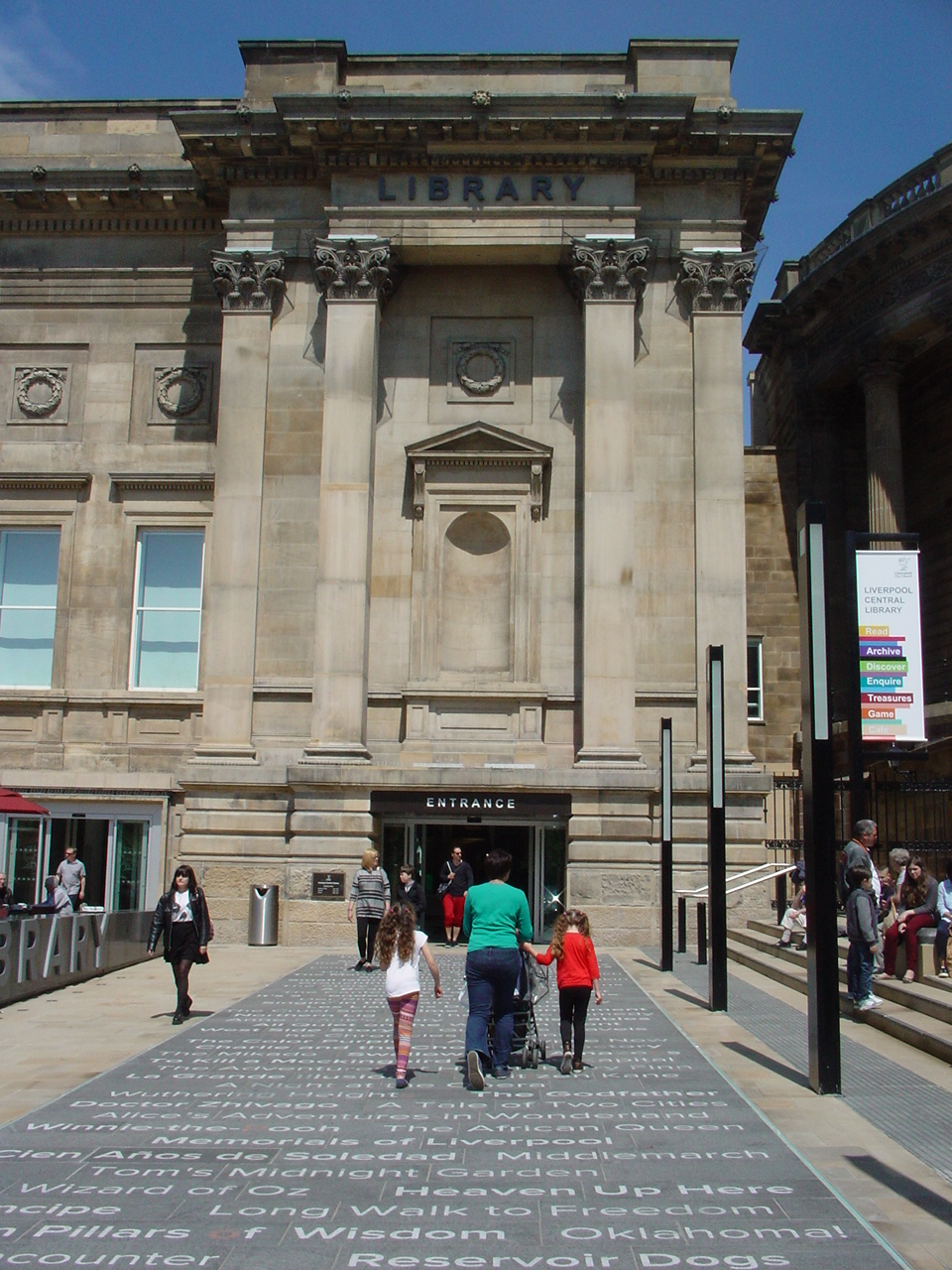
Main entrance to Liverpool Central Library

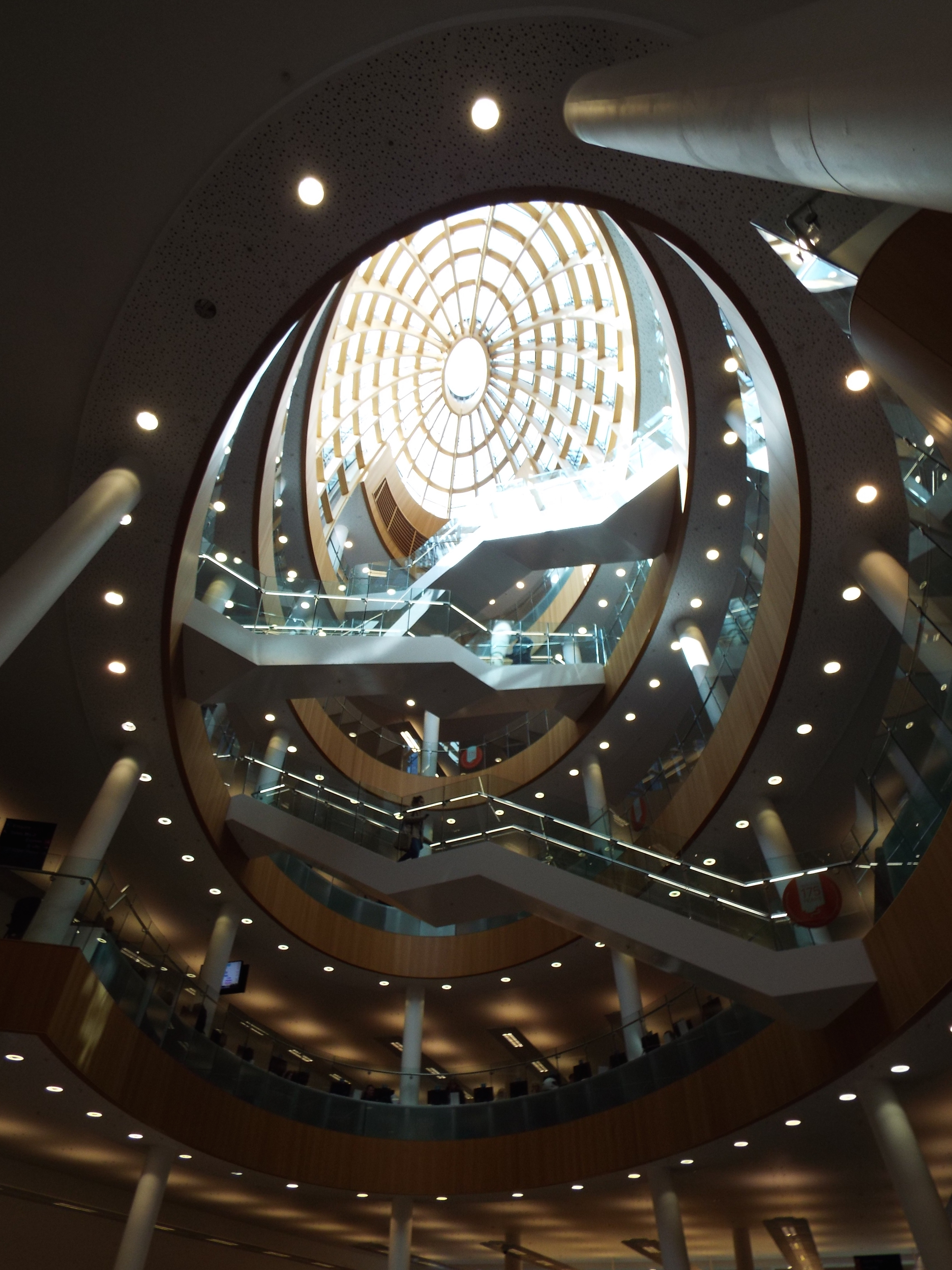
The atrium staircase of the Liverpool Central Library, view from the bottom

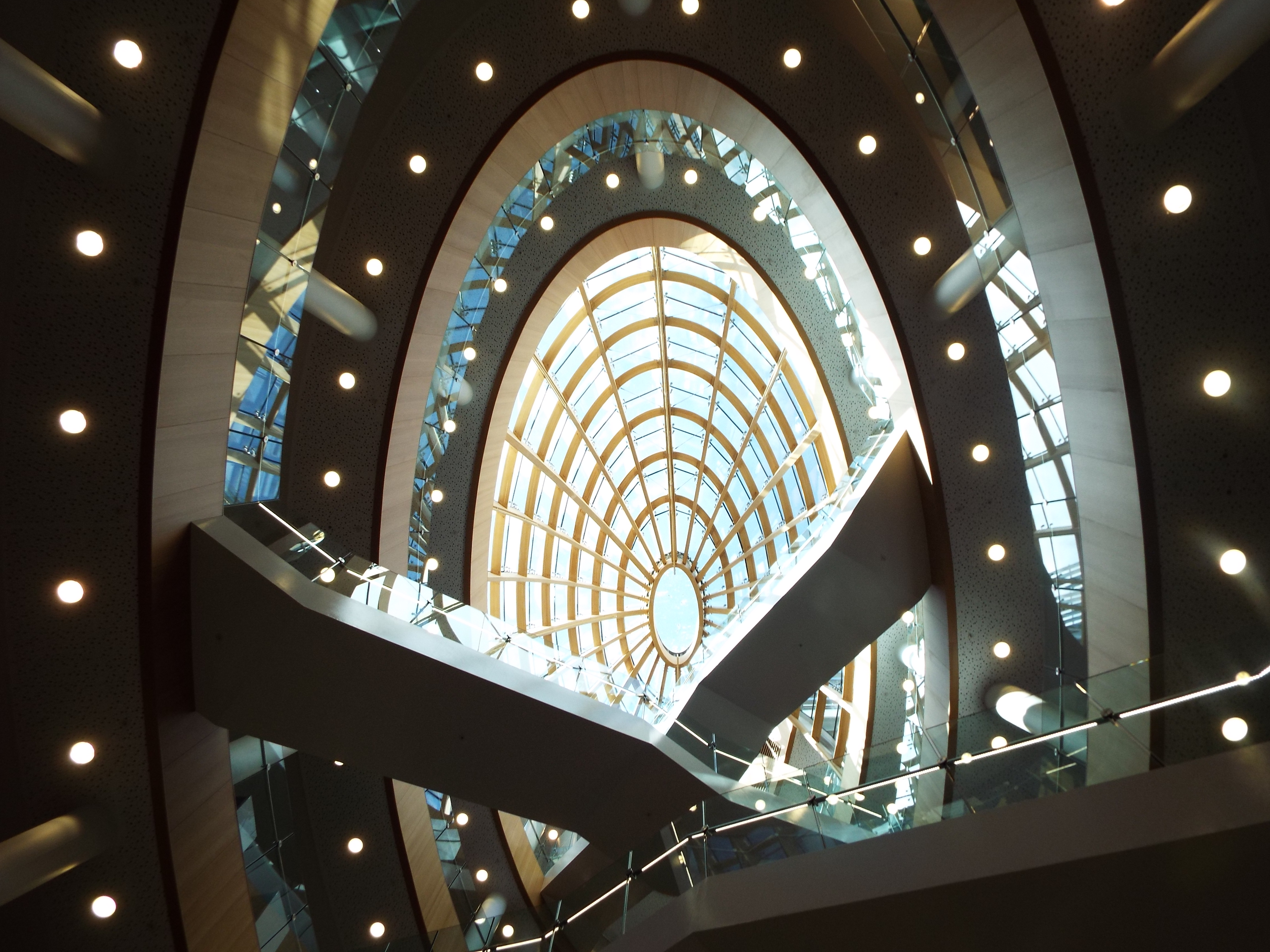
The atrium staircase of the Liverpool Central Library, view from the bottom

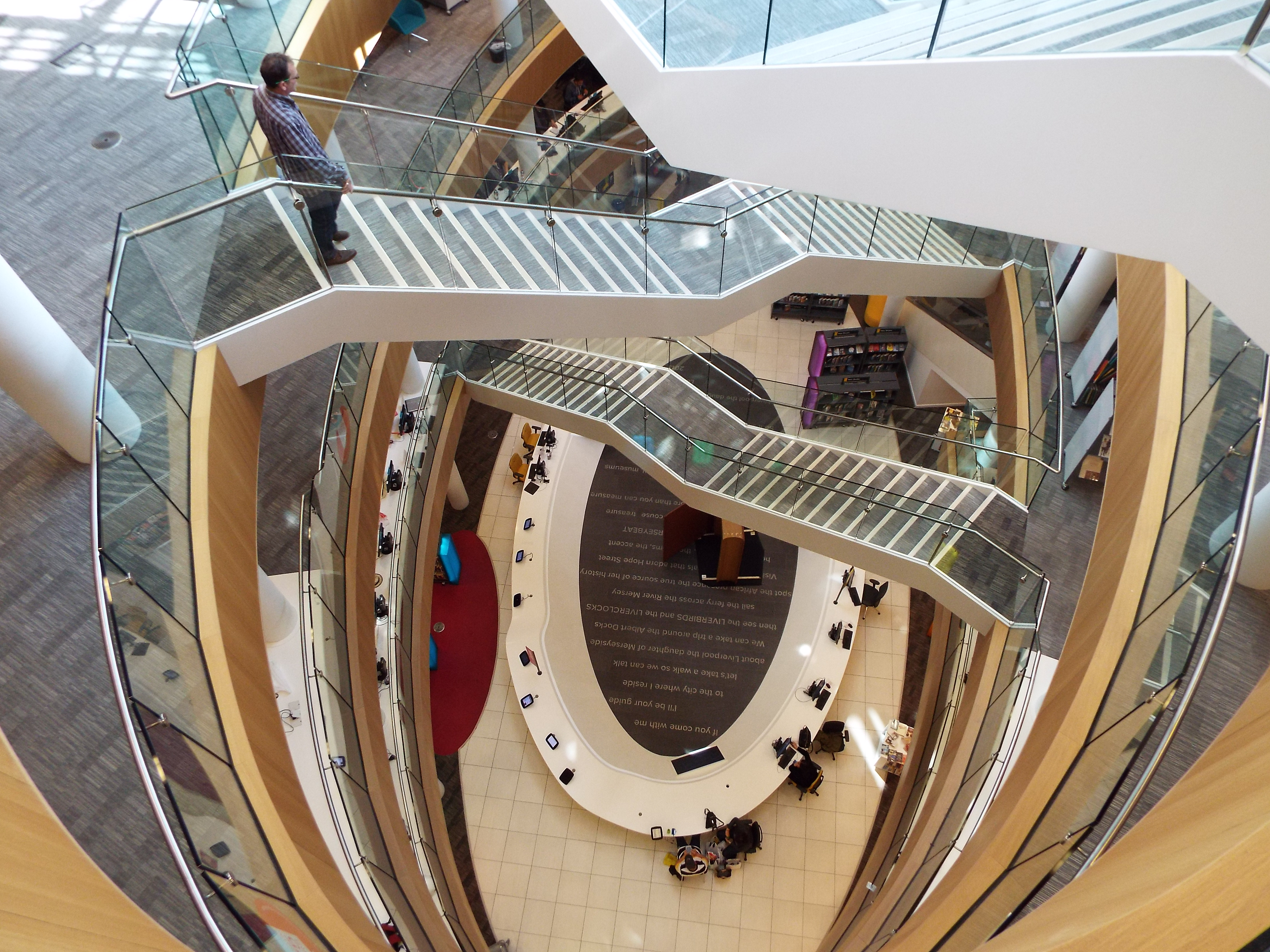
The atrium staircase of the Liverpool Central Library, view from the top

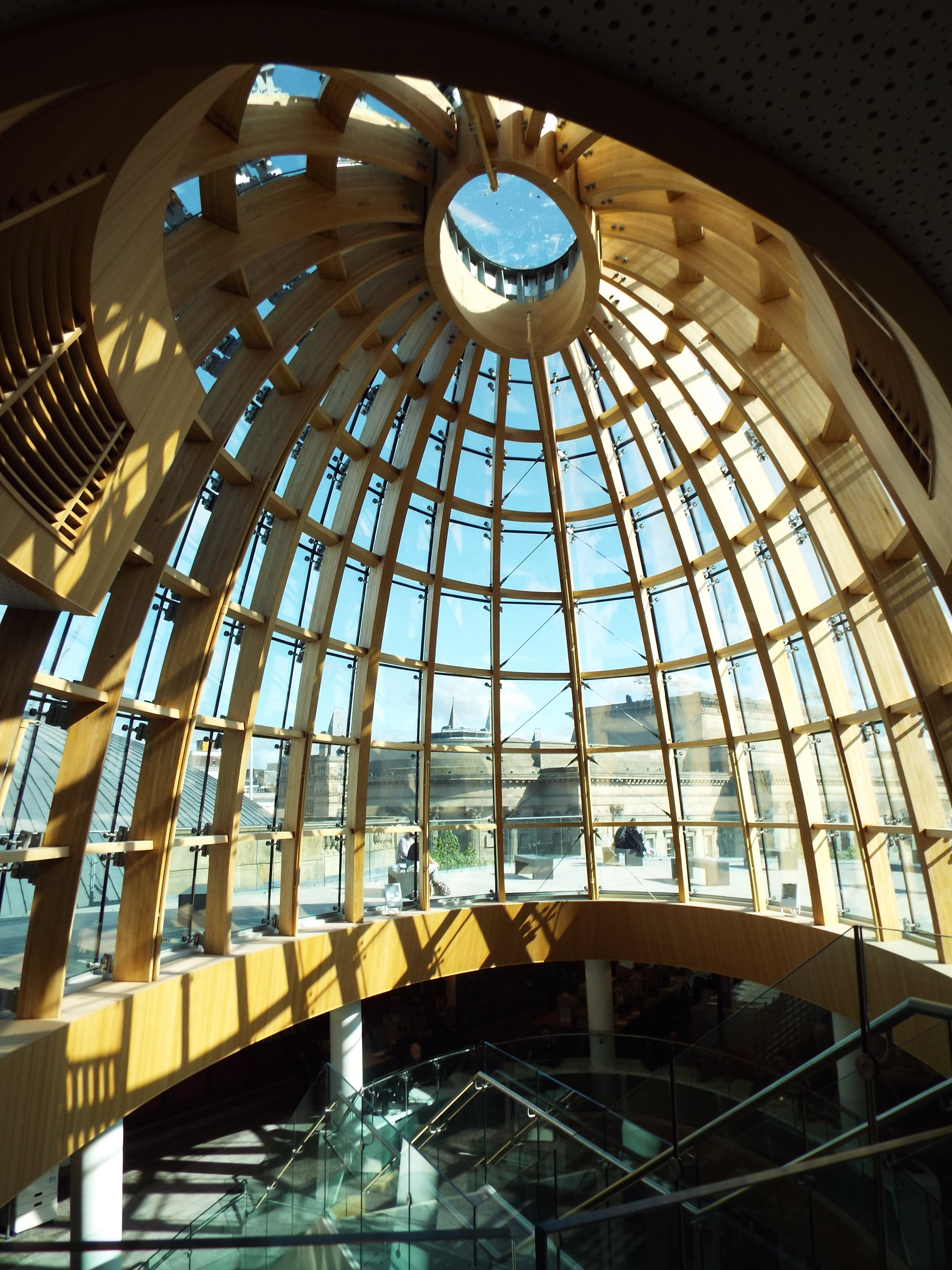
The atrium staircase of the Liverpool Central Library, rooftop glass structure

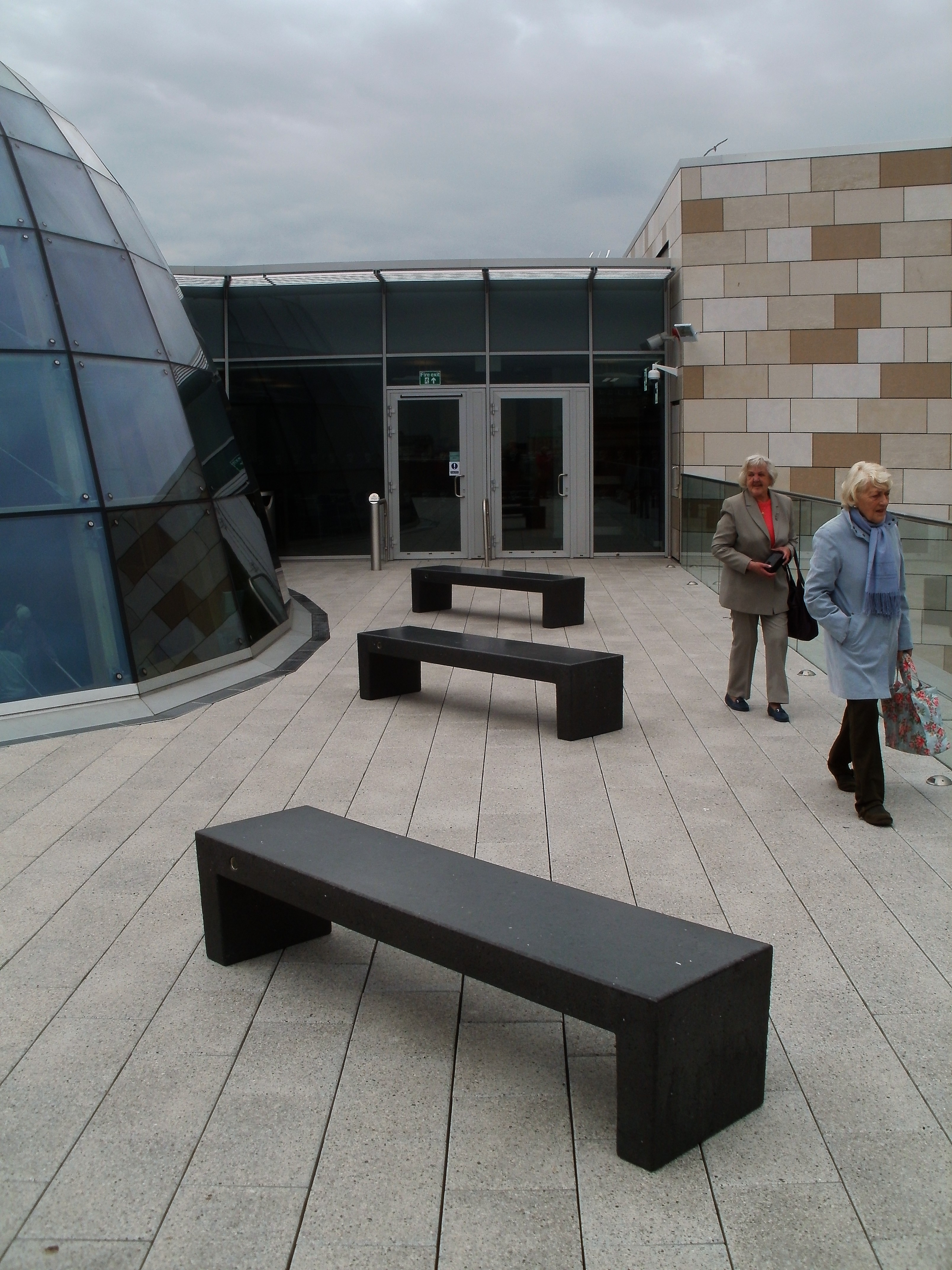
Liverpool Central Library Roof Terrace

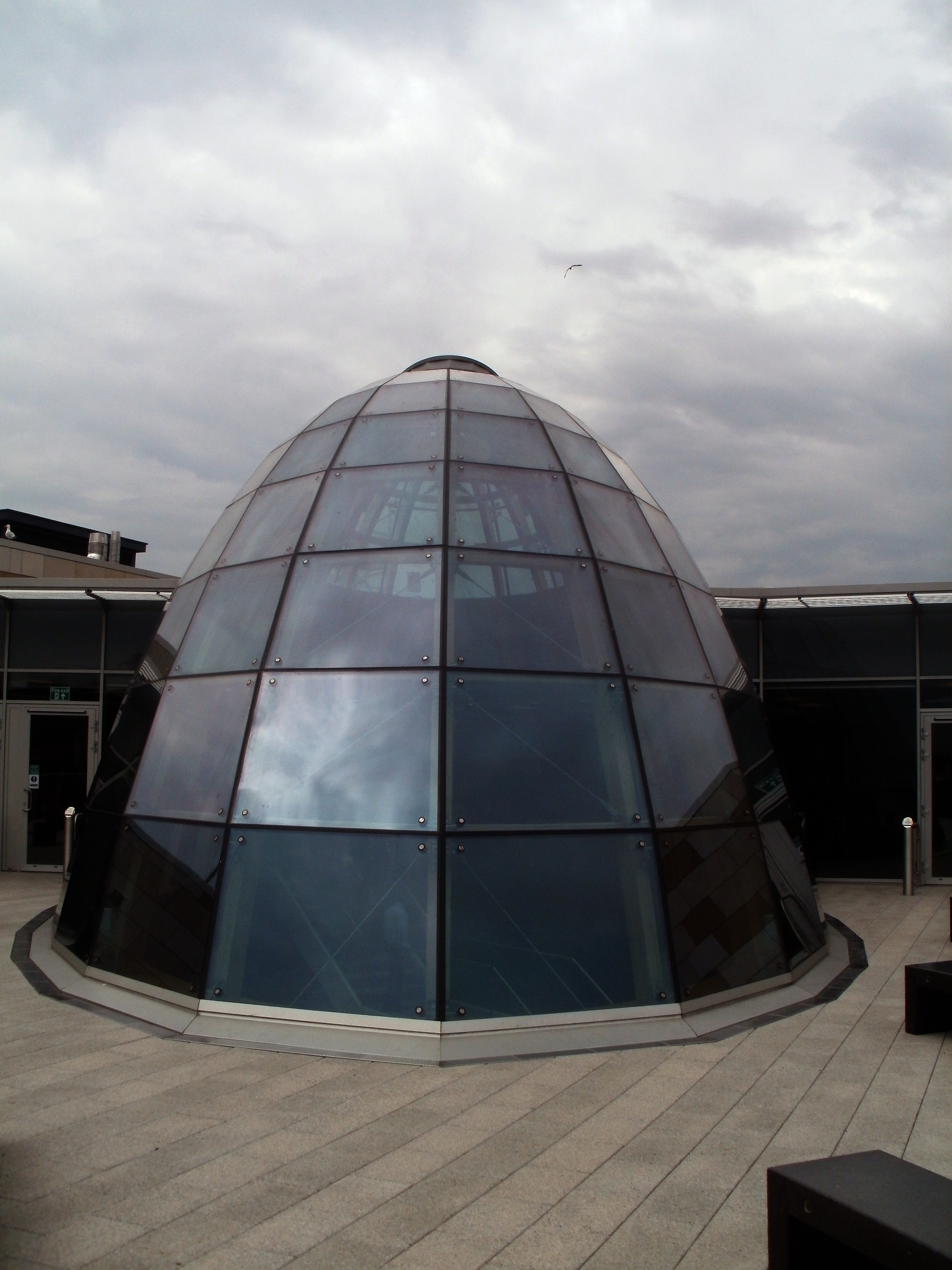
Liverpool Central Library Roof Terrace

== See also ==
- List of libraries in Liverpool
