= I.M. Marsh Campus =

Former campus of Liverpool John Moores University

IM Marsh Campus
- Type: Public
- Active: 1900 as Liverpool Physical Training College–July 2021
- Location: Liverpool, England, United Kingdom; 53.370214°N 2.9206°W
- Campus: former Urban
- Website: https://www.ljmu.ac.uk/study/undergraduate-students/visit-us/directions/im-marsh (former LJMU)

The I.M. Marsh Campus was a former campus of Liverpool John Moores University located in Aigburth, south Liverpool, England. Founded in 1900 as a college for training physical education teachers, the site developed into a centre for teacher education, physical education, and sport studies. It remained in operation until its closure in July 2021, following the relocation of academic activities to LJMU’s city centre campuses.

== History ==
The institution originated as the Liverpool Gymnasium College, founded in 1900 by Irene Marsh, an early advocate for women’s physical education. At the time of its founding, Marsh was serving as Director of the Bootle Gymnasium and teaching women’s classes at the Liverpool YMCA. She served as Principal of the college until 1937.

Initially located at 110 Bedford Street, near the city centre, the college expanded over time and moved to the Barkhill House estate between 1920 and 1929. The 18-acre site provided both indoor and outdoor training environments. In 1947, the institution was renamed the I.M. Marsh College of Physical Education, becoming the first state-maintained specialist college for women’s physical education in the United Kingdom.

Student admissions in the early 20th century reflected the social norms of the era. Applicants were expected to meet specific physical and behavioural standards, including height requirements and appearance guidelines. The college remained a women-only institution until 1985, when it became co-educational.

Marsh introduced pedagogical approaches based on physical education models from Germany and Sweden, and in 1917, she founded a Girl Guides Corps at the college. The site also received visits from Robert Baden-Powell, founder of the Scout movement.

In 1981, the college became part of Liverpool Polytechnic, along with F.L. Calder College, which also relocated to the campus. The polytechnic later gained university status as Liverpool John Moores University in 1992.

== Campus and Facilities ==
The I.M. Marsh Campus occupied an 18-acre site. The grounds included educational and recreational facilities designed to support training in physical education, sport, and teaching.

Academic resources included science and design technology laboratories, computer suites, a Learning Resource Centre, and studios for drama and dance—specifically, The Egg and the Sudley Dance Studio.

Sporting facilities were a prominent feature of the campus. These included a large indoor sports hall accommodating basketball, badminton, and five-a-side football; two gymnasiums; a climbing wall; a fitness suite; and a swimming pool. Outdoor amenities included tennis and netball courts, a full-sized AstroTurf pitch, and three playing fields. These were managed by Marsh Sports, a university-affiliated division.

Barkhill House, the original villa acquired by Irene Marsh in 1919, was part of the campus and remained a key landmark. In 2022, the building was granted listed status for its historical and architectural significance.

== Closure and Developments ==
In March 2011, LJMU announced plans to sell the I.M. Marsh Campus and consolidate teaching facilities at its city centre locations. The decision formed part of a broader estate redevelopment strategy.

Academic departments were gradually relocated over the following decade. The site formally closed in July 2021, ending over a century of continuous educational use.

== Legacy ==
The I.M. Marsh Campus played a central role in the development of physical education and teacher training in the United Kingdom. Under the leadership of Irene Marsh, the college introduced structured and holistic physical training programmes that influenced other institutions nationally.

Marsh’s contributions to educational theory and practice, particularly in the context of women’s education, are considered a significant part of the university’s institutional history.

== Notable Alumni and Staff ==
- Ian Usher - Studied Outdoor Education (1982–1985); later gained public attention for auctioning his personal possessions and lifestyle in 2008.
- Lindsey McAlister, MBE (1978–1979) - Theatre director; studied at the college in the late 1970s.
- Ellinor Hinks - Physical educator and filmmaker active in the mid-20th century.
