= One Foot in the Past =

- Genre: History
- Presented by: Kirsty Wark and others
- Theme music composer: Roger Bolton
- Country of origin: United Kingdom
- Original language: English

Original release
- Network: BBC2
- Release: 4 June 1993 – 3 June 2000

One Foot in the Past is a British television series on BBC2 that ran from 1993 to 2000. It considered conservation in, and the architecture, heritage and history of, the British Isles and, in three episodes, France, Italy and India. The series was a magazine programme. Each programme ran for 30 minutes.

From 16 April 1999, the series was part of the History Zone.

The series was subsequently broadcast outside the United Kingdom on BBC World.

== Production ==
The series was conceived by Roland Keating.

The programme had a segment called "Ruin of the Week".

== Finds and preservation ==
The series found the remains of Euston Arch and some of the remains of Skylon. This search for Euston Arch was the subject of the programme The Lost Arch (BBC2, 28 February 1994).

The series prevented the demolition of Bankside Power Station by mobilising public opinion against the demolition.

== Presenters ==
Presenters included Kirsty Wark and also:

- Joan Bakewell
- Roger Bowdler
- Dan Cruickshank
- Philippa Gregory
- Lucinda Lambton
- Jonathan Meades
- Elain Harwood

== Episodes ==
There are eight series, and there are a number of special episodes that are not included in those eight series. There are two series of repeats of portions of episodes, and a number of other edited repeats that are not included in those two series.

=== Series 1 ===
This series did not assume that pro-conservationist ideas must be right.

- Episode 1: 4 June 1993. This episode includes Bolton Abbey, and announced the discovery of some of the remains of Euston Arch. The music was by Roger Bolton.
- Episode 2: 11 June 1993.
- Episode 3: 18 June 1993. This episode includes Bankside Power Station.
- Episode 4: 25 June 1993
- Episode 5: 2 July 1993. This episode includes Bolton Abbey and the Albert Memorial.
- Episode 6: 9 July 1993. This episode includes St George's Hall in Windsor Castle.
- Episode 7: 16 July 1993. This episode includes the Midland Grand Hotel.
- Episode 8: 23 July 1993. This episode includes Chillingham Castle and the Scott Monument.

Repeats of segments of episodes of Series 1

- Ruins. 13 September 1993.

=== List It ===
- 3 April 1994. The title of this episode is List It.

=== Series 2 ===
- Episode 1: 7 June 1994. This episode includes Euston Arch.
- Episode 2: 14 June 1994. This episode includes Brooklands and the House in the Rock at Knaresborough.
- 21 June 1994, BBC1, 8:30pm. The title of this episode is The Other House of Windsor, and it is about Villa Windsor.
- 21 June 1994, BBC2, 9:45pm. This episode includes the Palace of Westminster.
- 5 July 1994. This episode includes Filey.
- 12 July 1994.
- 19 July 1994.
- 26 July 1994.
- 2 August 1994. This episode includes Portmeirion.
- 9 August 1994. This episode includes Brooklands and Skylon.
- 16 August 1994.

=== A Very Modern Love Affair? ===
- 12 April 1995: The title of this episode is A Very Modern Love Affair?

=== Series 3 ===
- Episode 1: 13 July 1995. This episode includes Westminster Abbey.
- Episode 2: 20 July 1995. This episode includes Hampton Court and Temple Newsam House.
- Episode 3: 27 July 1995. This episode includes Brodsworth House and the Elfin Oak.
- Episode 4: 3 August 1995.
- Episode 5: 17 August 1995. This episode includes Kelmscott Manor and St Bartholomew's Hospital.
- Episode 6: 24 August 1995. This episode includes Folly Farm in Berkshire.
- Episode 7: 31 August 1995. The title of this episode is The Baedeker Blitz.
- Episode 8: 7 September 1995.
- Episode 9: 14 September 1995. This episode includes Birmingham Town Hall and Euston Arch.

=== Brunel ===
- 17 November 1995. The title of this episode is Brunel. An episode on Isambard Kingdom Brunel. Part of a season on engineering. Repeated on 2 April 1996.

=== Series 4 ===
This series has nine episodes.

- Episode 1: 30 May 1996. This episode includes Hampton Court.
- Episode 2: 6 June 1996. This episode includes the Midland Hotel, Morecambe and Wormwood Scrubs.
- Episode 3: 13 June 1996. This episode includes Stoodley Pike.
- Episode 4: 20 June 1996. This episode includes Cliveden and the Tower of London.
- Episode 5: 27 June 1996. This episode includes Clouds Hill.
- Episode 6: 4 July 1996. This episode includes Birnbeck Pier.
- Episode 7: 11 July 1996. This episode includes the Palace of Whitehall.
- Episode 8: 18 July 1996. This episode includes Claybury Asylum, the Llangollen Steam Railway, and Roker Park. The segments on Claybury Asylum and Roker Park were postponed from 11 July.
- Episode 9: 8 August 1996. This episode includes Castle Leslie and the Firth of Forth Bridge. The segment on the Firth of Forth Bridge was postponed from 27 June.

=== One Foot on the Continent ===
- 15 August 1996. The title of this episode is One Foot on the Continent. This episode includes the Palazzo Cinese, Pienza Cathedral and Venzone in Italy.

=== Series 5 ===
This series has nine episodes.

- Episode 1: 9 July 1997. This episode includes Highbury and Wotton House.
- Episode 2: 16 July 1997. This episode includes Cheltenham, the Paignton and Dartmouth Steam Railway and Paignton Picture House, and the River Fleet.
- Episode 3: 23 July 1997. This episode includes Broadstairs.
- Episode 4: 30 July 1997. The title of this episode is One Foot in the Raj. It includes the Lalgarh Palace and St. Stephen's College, Delhi.
- Episode 5: 6 August 1997. This episode includes Bosham and The Old Wellington Inn.
- Episode 6: 13 August 1997. This episode includes the Apollo Pavilion and the building that was then called the Foreign and Commonwealth Office.
- Episode 7: 20 August 1997. This episode includes Crosby Hall, London, Dalkey Island and the Waltham Abbey Royal Gunpowder Mills.
- Episode 8: 27 August 1997. This episode includes University of Glasgow and its Anatomy Museum.
- Episode 9: 10 September 1997. This episode includes Chastleton House and Pinewood Studios.

=== One Foot in Broadcasting House ===
- 7 November 1997. The title of this episode is One Foot in Broadcasting House and it includes Broadcasting House.

=== Palaces of Apes ===
- 29 March 1998. The title of this episode is Palaces of Apes. Part of Evolution Weekend.

=== Series 6 ===
This series has eight episodes.

- Episode 1: 28 April 1998. This episode includes the Albert Memorial and Sunnycroft.
- Episode 2: 5 May 1998. This episode includes Claridge's, Duncombe Park, and the Scottish Parliament Building.
- Episode 3: 12 May 1998. This episode includes Bradenstoke Priory and Salisbury Cathedral.
- Episode 4: 19 May 1998. This episode includes Picton Library, the Post Office Tower and Toxteth Library.
- Episode 5: 26 May 1998. This episode includes Inchmahome Priory and the Troxy.
- Episode 6: 2 June 1998. This episode includes Arthur's Seat, Chatsworth House and Erddig Hall.
- Episode 7: 16 June 1998. This episode includes Windsor Castle.
- Episode 8: 23 June 1998. This episode includes Marlborough Street Magistrates Court and Newstead Abbey.

=== Birthplace of the Beatles ===
- 22 July 1998. The title of this episode is Birthplace of the Beatles, and it is about 20 Forthlin Road.

=== Series 7 ===
This series has seven episodes.

- Episode 1: 17 April 1999. This episode includes Ickworth House.
- Episode 2: 24 April 1999. This episode includes Goodwood Racecourse and Wentworth Woodhouse.
- Episode 3: 1 May 1999. This episode includes Castle Howard, the Radcliffe Camera, St Paul's Cathedral and Wilton House.
- Episode 4: 8 May 1999. This episode includes Petworth House.
- Episode 5: 22 May 1999. This episode includes Brighton Pavilion and Clovelly.
- Episode 6: 29 May 1999. This episode includes Lord's.
- Episode 7: 5 June 1999. This episode includes Eltham Palace.

=== World War II ===
The following episodes were first broadcast on 4 September 1999:

- Defence of the Land. This episode includes the Maunsell Forts.
- Defence of the People.
- Defence of the Art.

=== One Foot in the Festival of Britain ===
- 6 November 1999. The title of this episode is One Foot in the Festival of Britain and it includes the Festival of Britain and the Millennium Dome. Also called One Foot in the Future.

=== Series 8 ===
This series has eight episodes.

- Episode 1: 15 April 2000. This episode includes London Zoo.
- Episode 2: 22 April 2000. The title of this episode is Sex and the Georgian City.
- Episode 3: 29 April 2000. The title of this episode is Transport.
- Episode 4: 6 May 2000.
- Episode 5: 13 May 2000. The title of this episode is Nelson: the Hero and the Harlot, and it is about Horatio Nelson and Emma Hamilton.
- Episode 6: 20 May 2000. The title of this episode is Sculpture.
- Episode 7: 27 May 2000. The title of this episode is Decoration.
- Episode 8: 3 June 2000. Final episode, which includes Hestercombe gardens and Wellington Arch.

=== Series of repeats ===
Another Foot in the Past

Another Foot in the Past is a series of repeats of portions of episodes, first broadcast on BBC2 from 28 November 1995 to 16 January 1997.

Afoot Again in the Past

Afoot Again in the Past (2002) is a series of repeats of portions of episodes, first broadcast on BBC2 from 21 January 2002 onwards.

== Reception ==
The programme was popular.

In 1994, The Architects' Journal called the programme "excellent". William Cook called the programme "sterling". Christopher Beanland said the programme had "charm".

The series was criticised by Richard Morris.
