= Grade II listed buildings in Liverpool-L5 =

Liverpool is a city and port in Merseyside, England, which contains many listed buildings. A listed building is a structure designated by English Heritage of being of architectural and/or of historical importance and, as such, is included in the National Heritage List for England. There are three grades of listing, according to the degree of importance of the structure. Grade I includes those buildings that are of "exceptional interest, sometimes considered to be internationally important"; the buildings in Grade II* are "particularly important buildings of more than special interest"; and those in Grade II are "nationally important and of special interest". Very few buildings are included in Grade I — only 2.5% of the total. Grade II* buildings represent 5.5% of the total, while the great majority, 92%, are included in Grade II.

Liverpool contains more than 1,550 listed buildings, of which 28 are in Grade I, 109 in Grade II*, and the rest in Grade II. (Note: These figures are taken from a search in the National Heritage List for England in May 2013, and are subject to variation as further buildings are listed, grades are revised, or buildings are delisted.) This list contains the Grade II listed buildings in the L5 postal district of Liverpool. This area lies to the north of the centre of the city. It contains docks, including Stanley Dock, the original west end of the Leeds and Liverpool Canal, and the residential districts of Vauxhall, and Everton. The listed buildings include structures relating to the docks and canal, and elsewhere are churches, houses, a lock-up, a public house, a library, and lamp posts.

Grade II listed buildings from other areas in the city can be found through the box on the right, along with the lists of the Grade I and Grade II* buildings in the city.

== Buildings ==
Name	Location	Photograph	Built	Notes
Leigh Bridge	Athol Street; 53.42429°N 2.98960°W		1861	A bridge carrying Athol Street over the Leeds and Liverpool Canal. It consists of an iron segmental arch between rusticated stone abutments. The bridge has a balustrade with plaques giving details of its building.
St Alban's Church	Athol Street; 53.4240°N 2.9957°W		1849	A former Roman Catholic church, designed by Weightman and Hadfield. It is built in stone with a slate roof, and consists of a nave and chancel in one vessel, aisles, a clerestory, and a tower at the southwest. Since the church closed it has been used as a rock-climbing centre.
Boundary Bridge	Boundary Street; 53.42567°N 2.98918°W		1835	A bridge carrying Boundary Street over the Leeds and Liverpool Canal. It was widened in 1861. The original arch was in stone, and it has iron spans added later. The abutments are in stone with rusticated bases. The bridge has solid iron parapets.
Richmond Baptist Church	Breck Road; 53.4246°N 2.9554°W		1864	The chapel was designed by James Picton. It is in brick with stone dressings and a slate roof. The chapel is in two storeys, with two tiers of round-headed windows along the sides. Inside the chapel are galleries on four sides, which are carried on fluted iron columns with Corinthian capitals.
Dock wall with entrances	Collingwood Dock; 53.42114°N 3.00036°W	—	1848	Designed by Jesse Hartley, the wall is about 18 feet (5 m) high, and is built in granite. It contains five entrances, with gate piers, watchman's huts, turrets, and towers.
Church of Our Lady of Reconciliation	Eldon Street; 53.4175°N 2.9879°W		1859–60	A Roman Catholic church designed by E. W. Pugin. It is constructed in buff stone with red stone dressings and a slate roof. The church consists of a nave and chancel without separation, a clerestory, narrow aisles, and an apse at the east end. On the west gable is a small bellcote, beneath which is a rose window.
—	15–17 Fulton Street; 53.4255°N 2.9990°W		c. 1850	A pair of warehouses in a single building, later used for other purposes. They are in red brick and cast iron, and have dressings in brick and sandstone. There are four storeys and a front of eight bays, consisting of two four-bay gabled units each with central loading bays. The doorways are approached by steps, they are recessed and have segmental-arched heads. The windows are small, with segmental heads and sandstone sills.
—	107 Great Mersey Street; 53.4281°N 2.9824°W		Early 19th century	A brick house with stone dressings and a slate roof. It has two storeys and a rusticated basement. At the top of the house is a cornice and a parapet. The windows are sashes with wedge lintels.
—	109–117 Great Mersey Street; 53.4281°N 2.9821°W		Early 19th century	A terrace of five brick houses with stone dressings and a slate roof. They are in three storeys with basements, each house having two bays. At the top is a frieze and a cornice. The windows have wedge lintels; some of them are sashes and others are casements.
Everton Library	St Domingo Road; 53.4257°N 2.9706°W		1896	One of the branch libraries designed by Thomas Shelmerdine. It is built in brick and stone, and has a tiled roof. The library is in two storeys with three gabled bays, and has an octagonal turret in the corner. The windows are mullioned and transomed, and there are four round columns at the entrance.
Mere Bank Public House	Heyworth Street; 53.4252°N 2.9704°W		1881	A richly ornamented public house constructed in brick with terracotta, and timber-framing with pargeted plaster panels. It has a slate roof. The building has two storeys, with six bays on Heyworth Street, two bays on Mere Lane, and a canted bay between them. Features include carved birds and flowers, statues, and gables.
Lamp standard	Mere Lane; 53.42633°N 2.96646°W		Late 19th century	A richly ornamented iron lamp standard. It has a scrolled base, brackets and two lamps (not original).
St Anthony's Church	Scotland Road; 53.4223°N 2.9811°W		1832–33	A Roman Catholic church designed by John Broadbent. It is constructed in stone, the sides being stuccoed, and with a slate roof. All the windows are lancets. Inside is a flat coffered ceiling, and a west gallery. At the east end are three large arched niches, all containing altars.
Former lock-up	Shaw Street; 53.41743°N 2.96995°W		1787	The lock-up is constructed in red sandstone. It is a round structure with a conical roof.
Bridge	Stanley Dock; 53.42173°N 2.99661°W		c. 1848	The bridge is at the head of Stanley Dock, linking it to the Leeds and Liverpool Canal. Designed by Jesse Hartley, it is built in granite. The bridge consists of a single segmental-headed arch with bull-nosed voussoirs, a parapet, and carved abutments.
Entrance (northeast)	Stanley Dock; 53.42212°N 2.99674°W		c. 1845	This was designed by Jesse Hartley and consists of gate piers and a watchman's hut. They are built in granite rubble. The hut is in the centre, and has an oval plan.
Entrance (northwest)	Stanley Dock; 53.42217°N 3.00015°W		c. 1848	This was designed by Jesse Hartley and consists of gate piers and a watchman's hut. They are built in granite rubble. The hut is in the centre, and has an oval plan.
Entrance (Saltney Street east)	Stanley Dock; 53.42037°N 2.99683°W	Gate to Stanley Dock	c. 1848	This was designed by Jesse Hartley and consists of gate piers and a watchman's hut. They are built in granite rubble. The hut is in the centre, and has an oval plan.
Entrance (Saltney Street west)	Stanley Dock; 53.42029°N 2.99994°W		c. 1848	This was designed by Jesse Hartley and consists of gate piers and a watchman's hut. They are built in granite rubble. The hut is in the centre, and has an oval plan.
Hydraulic tower	Stanley Dock; 53.42198°N 3.00010°W		1854	A hydraulic centre consisting of a granite octagonal tower with a castellated parapet and slit windows, and a round chimney. It is attached to a five-bay block containing windows and with a Tudor arched entrance.
Locks and bridge	Stanley Dock; 53.42197°N 2.99279°W		1848	A sequence of four locks, and a bridge, designed by Jesse Hartley to connect the Leeds and Liverpool Canal to the Stanley Dock. The retaining walls are in granite and the gates are in wood.
Stanley warehouse	Stanley Dock; 53.4205°N 2.9984°W		1848	A warehouse designed by Jesse Hartley. It is in brick on a granite base, and has a stone ground floor. The warehouse has five storeys and stretches for 31 bays. On the north side are cast iron Doric columns. The windows are casements.
Tobacco warehouse	Stanley Dock; 53.4210°N 2.9986°W		1900	Claimed to have been the largest single brick building in the world, using 27 million bricks, this is constructed on a high stone base. It is 13 storeys high (125 feet (38 m)), and has 42 bays on the long fronts, and seven bays on the sides. It was built to be fireproof, with steel and concrete floors, and cast iron columns. Its sides are panelled with pilasters, and at the top are small pediments and parapets.
Kirkdale Community Centre	238A, Stanley Road; 53.43381°N 2.98509°W		1886	Built as the Gordon Working Lads' Institute and funded by Liverpool merchant William Cliff in memory of his eldest son who had died at 11 years of age in 1853. Designed by David Walker of Liverpool, it is built in Common brick with red brick dressings and a slate roof in a form of North European Late Gothic.
Lamp post	Titchfield Street; 53.41751°N 2.98623°W	—	1910–11	A lamp post built as part of the Eldon Grove development. It is in cast iron, and formerly incorporated drinking fountains. Rising from an ornamented base are fluted columns with two arms it stands on a high square plinth.

== See also ==
Architecture of Liverpool
