= Listed buildings in Ingleton, North Yorkshire =

Ingleton is a civil parish in the county of North Yorkshire, England. It contains 45 listed buildings that are recorded in the National Heritage List for England. Of these, two are listed at Grade II*, the middle of the three grades, and the others are at Grade II, the lowest grade. The parish contains the villages of Ingleton, Chapel-le-Dale, Cold Cotes and the surrounding countryside. Most of the listed buildings are houses and cottages, farmhouses and farm buildings. The others include two churches, tombs in a churchyard, two bridges, two railway viaducts, one disused, a limekiln, two boundary stones, an aqueduct and six milestones.

== Key ==
Grade	Criteria
II*	Particularly important buildings of more than special interest
II	Buildings of national importance and special interest

== Buildings ==
Name and location	Photograph	Date	Notes	Grade
St Mary's Church; 54.15430°N 2.46839°W		15th century	The oldest part of the church is the tower, and the body was rebuilt in 1886–87 by Cornelius Sherlock in Decorated style. It is in stone with a slate roof, and consists of a nave with a clerestory, north and south aisles, a south porch, a chancel with a north vestry, and a west tower. The tower has three stages, diagonal buttresses, a west doorway with a pointed arch, a chamfered surround and a hood mould, above which is a three-light window, a south clock face, two-light bell openings, a string course, and an embattled parapet with corner finials.	II*
Footbridge over Thorn Gill; 54.20984°N 2.34338°W		16th or 17th century	The narrow bridge carries a footpath over a stream. It is in limestone and millstone grit with iron ties, and consists of a single round arch on limestone bedrock.	II
Bruntscar Hall Farmhouse; 54.20572°N 2.40281°W		Mid-17th century	The house, which was extended to the right in 1689, is in limestone with a stone slate roof. The original part is now in ruins, and the later part has two storeys, and four bays, the right two bays projecting as a gabled wing. The doorway has a plain surround, and most of the windows are mullioned, with some mullions missing.	II
Hodge Hole Barn; 54.20348°N 2.40699°W	—	Mid-17th century	The barn with living accommodation is in stone with quoins and a stone slate roof. The barn has two storeys, the living accommodation has one, and there is a lean-to on the left. The openings include a cart entry, windows, doorways, a vent and a loft door.	II
Knotts View; 54.13583°N 2.43490°W		Mid-17th century	The cottage, which was extended later, is in limewashed stone, with painted stone dressings and a stone slate roof. There are two storeys, two bays, and a continuous rear outshut. The doorway has a chamfered surround, and most of the windows are mullioned, with some mullions missing.	II
St Leonard's Church; 54.18984°N 2.40328°W		Mid-17th century	The chapel, which was restored in 1869, is in limestone and has a stone slate roof. It consists of a three-bay nave, a south porch, and a one-bay chancel. At the west end is a gabled and corbelled bellcote, with an open pediment on the west side, and a basket arch with a keystone to the east. On the south wall is a slate sundial with a gnomon.	II
Souther Scales Farmhouse; 54.18806°N 2.39710°W		1765	The farmhouse is in stone with a stone slate roof, two storeys and three bays. On the front is a gabled porch, its entrance with a plain surround, and in the gable is an initialled datestone with a floral motif above. Most of the windows are mullioned, some mullions are missing and one has been converted into a French window.	II
Peartree Cottage; 54.15217°N 2.47044°W		Mid- to late 17th century	The house is in stone with a stone slate roof and the gable end facing the street. There are two storeys and four bays. On the front are two doorways, and the windows are a mix, with some mullioned and some mullions missing, and sashes. At the rear is a projecting round stair turret with a lean-to roof.	II
Seed Hill; 54.15453°N 2.46706°W		Mid- to late 17th century	The house, later divided, is in stone, with paired eaves brackets, and a stone slate roof. There are two storeys, three bays, and a rear wing. On the front is a projecting gabled two-storey porch, with a doorway above which is a window with a basket-arched lintel, moulded imposts, bargeboards and a vase finial. Most of the windows are mullioned, with some mullions missing.	II
Woodthorpe Farmhouse; 54.13595°N 2.43439°W		Mid- to late 17th century	The farmhouse is in stone, with a stone slate roof, two storeys and three bays. On the front is a gabled porch, its entrance with a plain lintel, and the windows are mullioned.	II
Pan Well Cottage; 54.15214°N 2.46602°W		c. 1670	The cottage is in rendered stone, with millstone grit dressings and a stone slate roof. There are two storeys and two bays, and the gable end faces the street. Most of the windows are mullioned and some mullions are missing.	II
Low Scale Farmhouse; 54.19256°N 2.40835°W	—	Late 17th century	The farmhouse is in limestone with millstone grit dressings and a stone slate roof. There are two storeys, two bays, and an extension and an outshut on the left. In the left bay is a stable door, most of the windows are mullioned, and there is a round-arched fire window with a chamfered surround.	II
Withen's; 54.13663°N 2.43346°W		Late 17th century	The oldest part is the rear wing with the front range added in the 18th century, The house is in stone with eaves modillions and a stone slate roof. There are two storeys, a front range of three bays, and a two-bay rear wing. The doorway has a plain surround, and the windows are mullioned. Above the doorway, and at a slight angle to the front, is a sundial with fluted Ionic pilasters and an entablature, and a slate face with an iron gnomon.	II
Brackenber Farmhouse; 54.13588°N 2.43459°W		1696	The farmhouse is in stone, with painted stone dressings and a stone slate roof, and the gabled end faces the street. There are two storeys and five bays. In the centre is a gabled porch with a moulded surround, and an initialled and dated lintel decorated with three cusped recesses. The windows are a mix of mullioned windows, with some mullions missing, and sashes.	II
1–3 Bell Horse Gate; 54.15392°N 2.46877°W		c. 1700	The house, later divided, is in stone with a stone slate roof and shaped kneelers. There are two storeys and three bays, On the front is a gabled porch with a rusticated surround, a lintel with imitation voussoirs and a keystone, and a pediment. To the right is a doorway with a plain surround, and most of the windows are casements.	II
Slatenber Farmhouse; 54.14364°N 2.44489°W		c. 1700	The farmhouse is in stone, with quoins, a moulded cornice-gutter with shaped corbels, and a roof of sandstone and slate with shaped kneelers. There are two storeys and three bays. On the front is a gabled porch with a terracotta finial, moulded imposts, and a basket-arched lintel. The other doorway and the windows, which are sashes, have plain surrounds.	II
Twistleton Manor Farmhouse; 54.16239°N 2.46524°W		1717	The farmhouse is in stone with a stone slate roof. There are two storeys and two bays. In the centre is a porch with a moulded surround, a pulvinated frieze and a pedimented gable. The entrance has a moulded surround and a lintel with a dated and initialled keystone. Most of the windows are mullioned.	II
Bridge End Bridge; 54.15414°N 2.46968°W		Early 18th century (probable)	The bridge carries a road over the River Dee. It is in stone, and consists of a single segmental arch. On the upstream side is a raking string course, on the downstream side are pilasters, and the bridge has a coped parapet.	II
Field House; 54.14927°N 2.47197°W	—	Mid-18th century	The farmhouse is pebbledashed, with painted stone dressings, square modillions, and a slate roof with gable coping and shaped kneelers. There are two storeys and three bays. In the centre of the entrance front is a doorway with a plain surround, and the windows are mullioned with moulded surrounds. At the rear, the original entrance, which has been converted into a window, has moulded imposts and contains sashes, and there is a full height stair window with transoms.	II
Wethercote House; 54.19285°N 2.40186°W	—	Mid-18th century	The house, which was later extended, is in limestone, with millstone grit dressings, quoins, and a stone slate roof. There are two storeys and four bays, the right bay gabled. On the front is a porch with a ogee-headed hood mould. Most of the windows are mullioned, and some also have transoms.	II
Wildman's Farmhouse; 54.13592°N 2.43621°W		Mid-18th century	The farmhouse is in stone, with a stone slate roof, two storeys and two bays. The central doorway has a moulded surround, above it a blocked single light, and the other windows are mullioned.	II
Three chest tombs 54.15411°N 2.46851°W		1764	The chest tombs are in the churchyard of St Mary's Church, to the south of the church. They are in sandstone, and each tomb has baluster-like pilasters carrying the tomb top.	II
Scar End Farmhouse; 54.17103°N 2.45915°W		Late 18th century	The farmhouse is in rendered stone, with painted stone dressings and a stone slate roof. There are two storeys, four bays, and a continuous rear outshut. On the front are two doorways with plain surrounds, and the windows are mullioned. At the rear is a tall narrow stair window with a chamfered surround.	II
Yarlsber Farmhouse and House; 54.14700°N 2.45312°W		Late 18th century	The farmhouse and house, which forms a cross-wing, are pebbledashed, and each has thee storeys and three bays, shaped eaves modillions, and stone slate roofs with shaped kneelers. The farmhouse has a central porch and casement windows with plain surrounds. At the rear is a blocked doorway with a chamfered surround, and a decorated initialled and dated lintel. The house has a central doorway with moulded imposts, and a mix of sash and casement windows.	II
Yanham's House; 54.15408°N 2.46589°W		c. 1790	The house is rendered, and has chamfered quoins, a sill band, an eaves cornice, an eaves frieze with paterae and fluting, and a coped slate roof with shaped kneelers. There are two storeys and three bays. The central doorway has Doric engaged pillars, a fluted frieze, and an open pediment with paterae in the tympanum. Above the doorway is a sash window, and the other windows have three stepped lights and mullions.	II
Holly Platt Farmhouse; 54.14294°N 2.44164°W		Early 19th century	The farmhouse is in rendered stone with stone dressings and a stone slate roof. There are two storeys and four bays. Projecting from the front is a two-storey gabled porch with doorways on the sides. The windows are mullioned.	II
Lane End House; 54.13664°N 2.43379°W		Early 19th century	The house is in rendered stone, with stone dressings, square eaves brackets, and a slate roof. There are two storeys and three bays. The central doorway has a plain surround, the windows are sashes. At the rear is a round-headed stair window with a keystone.	II
Limekiln; 54.20071°N 2.34877°W	—	Early 19th century	The limekiln is in limestone with millstone grit dressings, and is built into a limestone outcrop. The stoke hole has a round arch, and there is a convex retaining wall.	II
Slated Mansion; 54.15193°N 2.47187°W		Early 19th century	A farmhouse, later a private house, in limewashed stone, with painted stone dressings, and a stone slate roof. There are two storeys and two bays. The central doorway has a re-set decorated initialled and dated lintel, and the windows are casements.	II
Boundary stone at SD7103870409; 54.12877°N 2.44471°W		Early to mid-19th century (probable)	The boundary stone is on the north side of the A65 road. It is in painted millstone grit and has a pointed top. There are two horizontal scored lines, between which is inscribed "INGLETON" and "CLAPHAM" and these are separated by a vertical groove.	II
Bridgeend Guest House; 54.15430°N 2.46980°W		c. 1840	The building is in stone, with chamfered quoins, a sill band, paired eaves modillions, and a stone slate roof. There are three storeys and three bays. The main entrance has a moulded surround, a rectangular fanlight and a hood on brackets, and to the left is a doorway with a plain surround. The windows are sashes, and at the rear is a full height stair window.	II
Toll House; 54.14920°N 2.47721°W		c. 1840	The cottage, originally a toll house, is in stone, with a hipped slate roof. There is a single storey and two bays. The doorway on the left has a plain surround, the windows have chamfered surrounds and thin mullions, and all the openings have hood moulds.	II
Brook House; 54.13538°N 2.47526°W	—	1859	The house is in stone, with chamfered quoins, and a stone slate roof. There are two storeys and three bays. In the centre is a doorway with a plain surround, a rectangular fanlight and a moulded hood. The windows are sashes, and above the doorway are three panels, the middle one with initials and the date.	II
Former Police Station; 54.15238°N 2.46320°W		Mid-19th century	The house, at one time a police station, is in limestone, with millstone grit dressings, projecting quoins, a sill band, eaves modillions, and a stone slate roof. There are two storeys and three bays. The central doorway has a chamfered surround, a rectangular fanlight, and a massive pediment on consoles, and the windows are sashes.	II
Ingleton Viaduct; 54.15325°N 2.47143°W		1859–60	The viaduct was built by the Midland Railway to carry its line over the River Greta. It is in stone and brick, and consists of eleven round arches. The pillars are splayed and have projecting imposts, and there is a string course at the parapet base.	II
Bank Hall; 54.15300°N 2.46933°W		c. 1860	A house, later divided, it is pebbledashed, with painted stone dressings and a sone slate roof. There are two storeys and three bays, and to the right is a lower single-bay extension. In the centre is a doorway with a chamfered surround, a dentilled cornice, and an embattled parapet with dropped finials. The windows are sashes with chamfered surrounds and hood moulds. Between the floors is an initialled and dated panel. In the extension is a doorway with a plain surround, paterae and a slate hood.	II
Boundary stone at SD7904283493; 54.24678°N 2.32325°W		Mid- to late 19th century	The parish boundary stone is on the north side of Newby Head Gate. It is in millstone grit, about 60 centimetres (24 in) high, and has a basket-arched top. The stone is inscribed with "DENT" and "INGLETON", and there is a benchmark.	II
Aqueduct bridge number 71; 54.22988°N 2.36843°W		c. 1870	The aqueduct carries Force Gill over the Settle–Carlisle line. There is a segmental arch at both ends in blue engineering brick on stone piers. These are flanked by buttresses, and triangular abutment walls with a band and a coped parapet. The channel curves and has eight steps and sloping side walls, and on each side are drystone walls.	II
Batty Moss Railway Viaduct; 54.21040°N 2.37019°W		1870–74	The viaduct carries the Settle–Carlisle railway across Batty Moss in the Ribble Valley. It is in stone and brick, and consists of 24 segmental arches on tapering piers. The viaduct is 104 feet (32 m) high at its highest point.	II*
Milestone at SD7952583011; 54.24240°N 2.31573°W		Early 19th century	The milestone on the east side of the B6255 road consists of a painted cast iron plate bolted on to a millstone grit back plate. It has a triangular plan and a rounded top. On the top is inscribed "LANCASTER & RICHMOND ROAD" and "INGLETON", on the left side are the distances to Ingleton and Lancaster, and on the right side to Hawes and Richmond.	II
Milestone at SD7833880233; 54.21737°N 2.33353°W		Early 19th century	The milestone on the south side of the B6255 road consists of a painted cast iron plate bolted on to a millstone grit back plate. It has a triangular plan and a rounded top. On the top is inscribed "LANCASTER & RICHMOND ROAD" and "INGLETON", on the left side are the distances to Ingleton and Lancaster, and on the right side to Hawes and Richmond.	II
Milestone at SD7694279486; 54.21061°N 2.35508°W		Early 19th century	The milestone on the south side of the B6255 road consists of a painted cast iron plate bolted on to a millstone grit back plate. It has a triangular plan and a rounded top. On the top is inscribed "LANCASTER & RICHMOND ROAD" and "INGLETON", on the left side are the distances to Ingleton and Lancaster, and on the right side to Hawes and Richmond.	II
Milestone at SD7008373060; 54.15247°N 2.45956°W		Early 19th century	The milestone on the south side of the B6255 road consists of a painted cast iron plate bolted on to a millstone grit back plate. It has a triangular plan and a rounded top. On the top is inscribed "LANCASTER & RICHMOND ROAD" and "INGLETON", on the left side are the distances to Ingleton and Lancaster, and on the right side to Hawes and Richmond.	II
Milestone at SD7921281518; 54.22900°N 2.32043°W		Early 19th century	The milestone on the east side of the B6255 road consists of a painted cast iron plate bolted on to a millstone grit back plate. It has a triangular plan and a rounded top. On the top is inscribed "LANCASTER & RICHMOND ROAD" and "INGLETON", on the left side are the distances to Ingleton and Lancaster, and on the right side to Hawes and Richmond.	II
Milestone at SD7572078511; 54.20176°N 2.37369°W		Early 19th century	The milestone on the southeast side of the B6255 road consists of a painted cast iron plate bolted on to a millstone grit back plate. It has a triangular plan and a rounded top. On the top is inscribed "LANCASTER & RICHMOND ROAD" and "INGLETON", on the left side are the distances to Ingleton and Lancaster, and on the right side to Hawes and Richmond.	II
