= Henry Hill Vale =

British architect

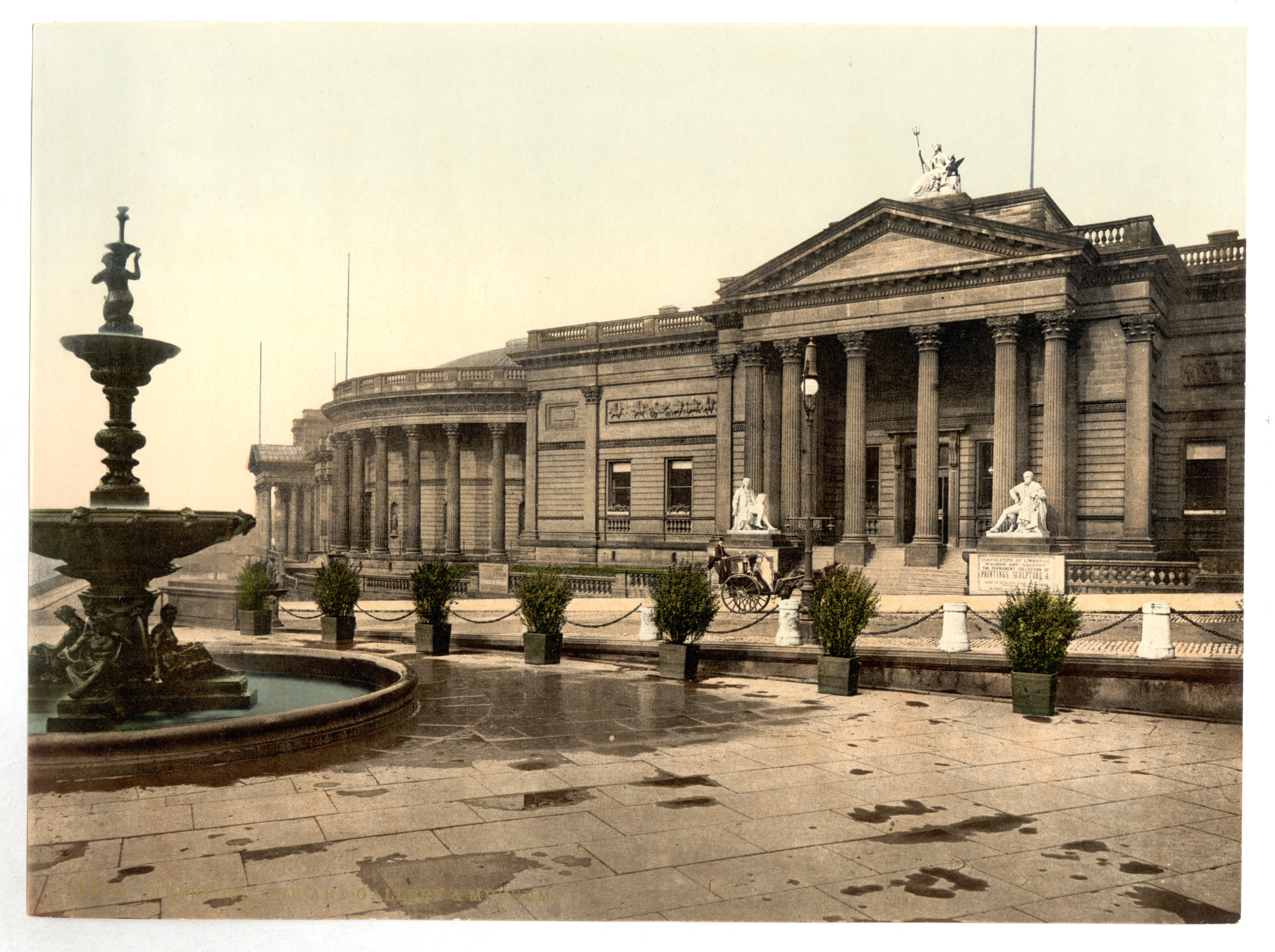
The Walker Art Gallery, Liverpool

Henry Hill Vale (1831 – 26 August 1875) was a British architect who was active in North West England in the late 19th century. He was born in Liverpool, Lancashire, into a Warwickshire family, and studied under the Liverpudlian architect Henry Roberts.

Vale served as president of the Liverpool Architectural Society 1870-72. He is noted as one of the architects responsible for the design of the Walker Art Gallery in Liverpool.

== Work ==
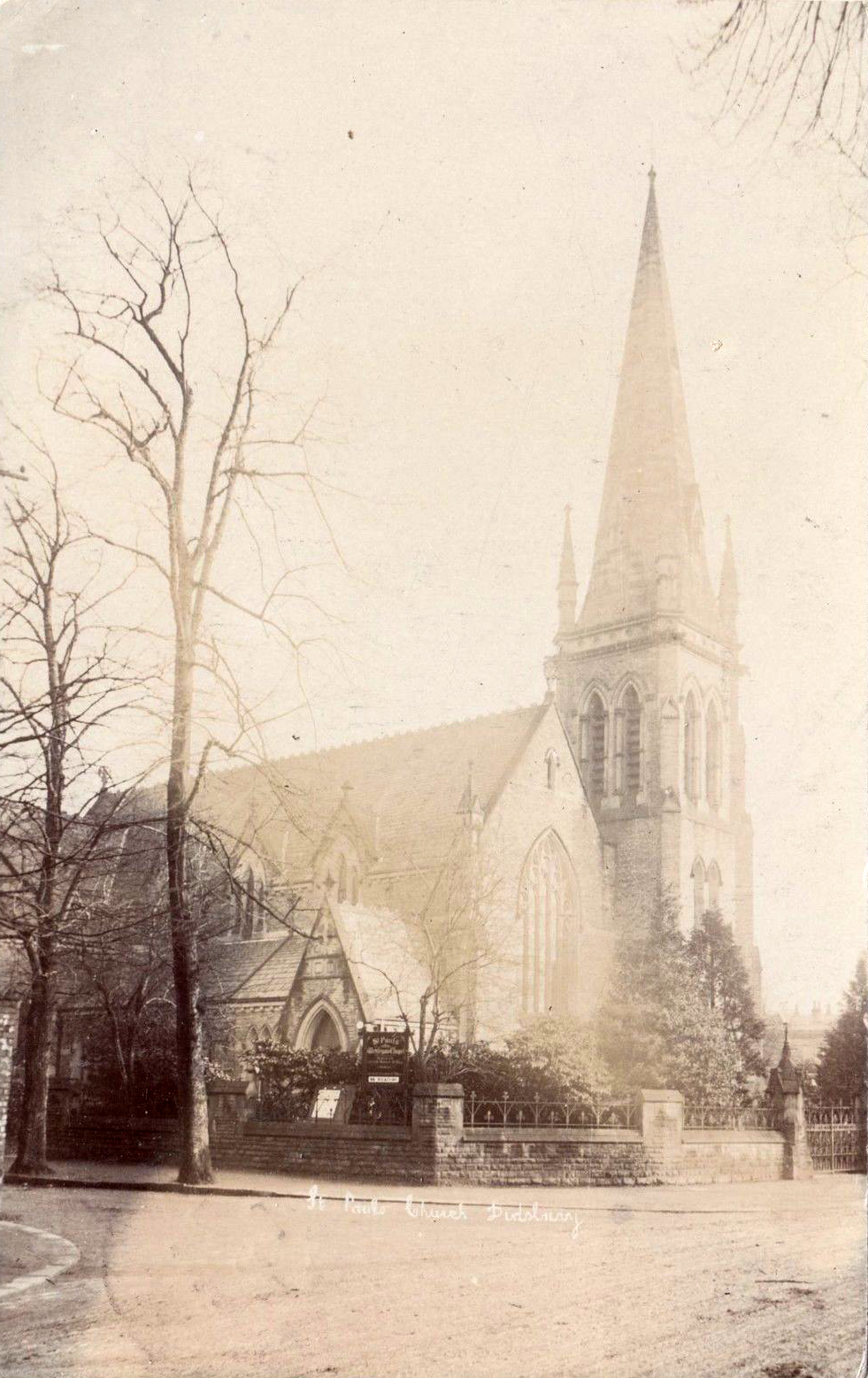
St Paul's Methodist Church in Didsbury, Manchester

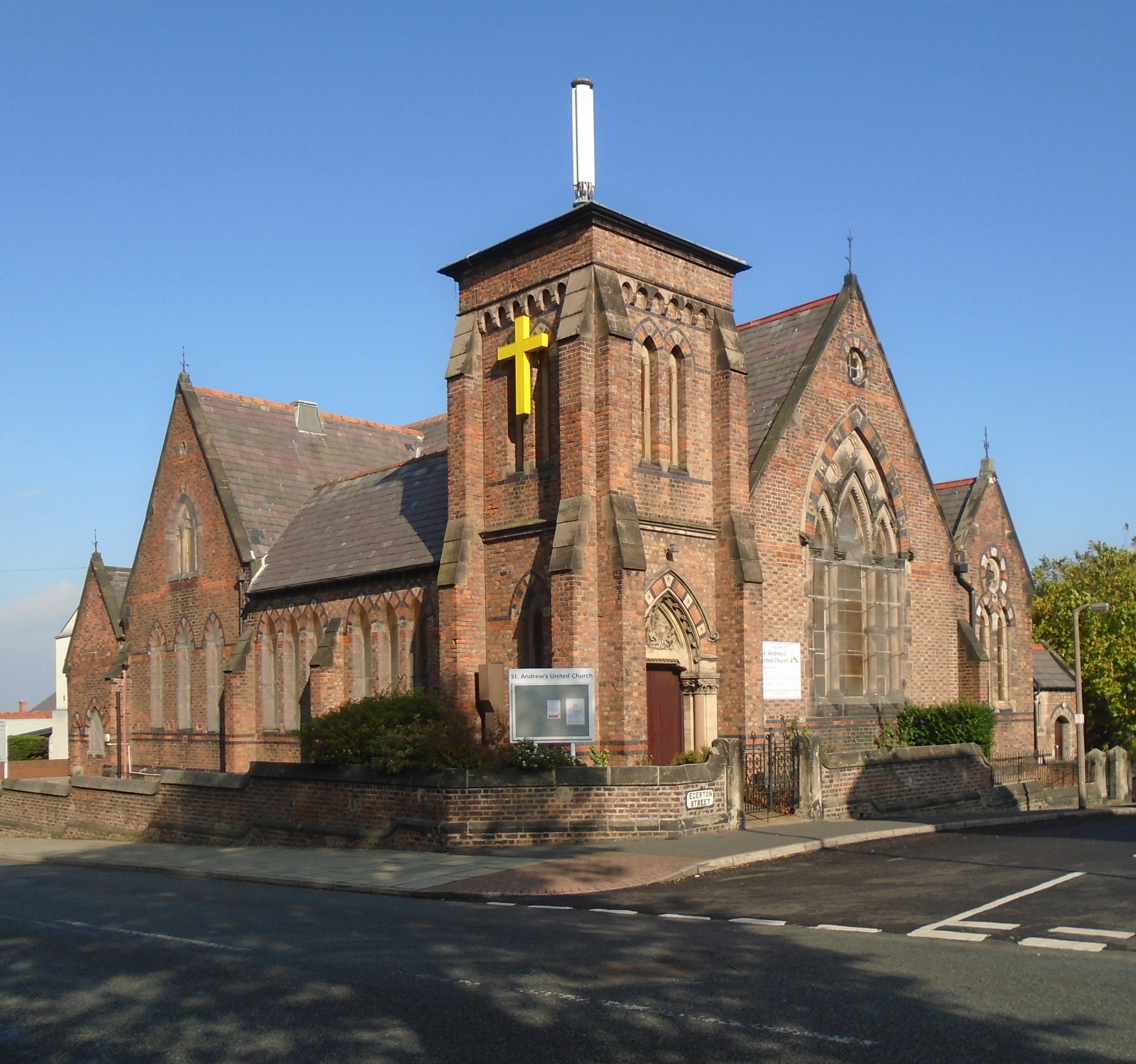
St Andrews United Church, New Brighton

In 1874, Vale was commissioned to assist the architect Cornelius Sherlock in the design of the Neoclassical Walker Art Gallery in Liverpool. At the laying of the foundation stone in 1874, Vale and Sherlock were presented by Lord Sandon to the Duke of Edinburgh. Vale had previously worked for the gallery's benefactor, Sir Andrew Barclay Walker, on an unrealised project to build a church for his house at Gateacre in 1868. Walker commissioned work from Vale again in 1874, on a proposal for an ornate Gothic Revival-style Conservative Club building in Liverpool, also unrealised.

Vale's buildings include:

- A row of offices and shops on Lord Street, Liverpool (1867)
- St Andrew's United Church in New Brighton, Wallasey (1869)
- Walker Art Gallery, Liverpool (1877)
- St Paul's Methodist Church, Didsbury, Manchester (1877)
- A Congregational Church on Aigburth Road, Liverpool
- The Anglican Church of St. John and St. Philip in The Hague, Netherlands (1873, destroyed 1945)
- The YMCA building on Mount Pleasant, Liverpool

Vale was the architect for a number of other buildings in Liverpool, including residential villas in Sefton Park, an infants' school in West Derby, Earle & King linseed oil mill on Burlington Street, and a commercial block on the corner of Whitechapel and Richmond Street. Vale also designed a new banking building for the Liverpool Sailors' Home.

== Death ==
Vale reportedly suffered from chronic mental health problems and a form of psychological stress. On 26 August 1875, while at home with his wife and daughter, Vale took a dose of laudanum and drowned himself in a pond behind the family house. His suicide was attributed to "temporary insanity" caused by pressure of work.

Vale's death occurred part-way through the Walker Art Gallery project; following this, Vale's contribution to the design no longer appeared on architectural documentation and Sherlock claimed credit for the entire project.
