= List of architectural works by Thomas Shelmerdine =

Thomas Shelmerdine (1845–1921) was an English architect and surveyor who spent most of his career as the land steward and surveyor to the Corporation of Liverpool. In this role he was involved with many projects in the city, including slum clearance. public housing and road widening. Shelmerdine also designed public buildings including hospitals, offices, fire stations, a fish market, schools, and libraries. At least five of his branch libraries have survived and are designated as listed buildings by English Heritage. His most highly regarded works are the Hornby Library within Liverpool Central Library, which is listed at Grade II*, and enlarging the council chamber at Liverpool Town Hall. He was also responsible for laying out St John's Gardens. Shelmerdine's designs include a number of architectural styles, including Italian Renaissance, Baroque, and Arts and Crafts.

== Key ==
| Grade | Criteria |
|---|---|
| I | Buildings of exceptional interest, sometimes considered to be internationally important |
| II* | Particularly important buildings of more than special interest |
| II | Buildings of national importance and special interest |
| U | Not listed |

== Major extant architectural works ==
| Name | Location | Photograph | Date | Notes | Grade |
|---|---|---|---|---|---|
| North Lodge | Speke Hall; 53.34180°N 2.86812°W | | 1867–68 | The lodge stands at the entrance to the drive to the hall. It is a stuccoed building painted to resemble timber-framing. It has a T-shaped plan, with a porch in the angle, and is in one storey. The gabled bay on the right has a mullioned and transomed window; the other windows are sashes. The porch is in timber and is gabled. | II |
| Ullet Road entrance | Sefton Park; 53.38688°N 2.94766°W | | 1874 | Standing at the main entrance to the park, this consists of a screen flanked by gate piers, all in stone. The base is buttressed with arched recesses. It supports three columns, the central one being slim and in sandstone, the lateral two being broader, and in granite. These carry a slate roof with iron cresting. The four piers are in granite with conical caps, three of them carrying lamps. | II |
| Former police station and fire station | Westminster Road, Kirkdale; 53.4356°N 2.9748°W | | 1885 | This consisted of a police station, a fire station and a bridewell. It has a complex plan, and is built in brick with sandstone dressings and slate roofs. The windows are mullioned and transomed. Arising from the roof of the former police station is a tiled spire. | II |
| Public Library | Kensington, Liverpool; 53.4116°N 2.9535°W | | 1890 | This was the first branch library in Liverpool, and was extended in 1897. It is an asymmetrical building in red brick with stone dressings and a tiled roof. It has an octagonal timber lantern surmounted by a cupola. The entrance porch has a semicircular pediment and Ionic columns. The wing to the left of the entrance has a large round-headed mullioned and transomed window and a small gable. The right wing has a Venetian window, an arcaded parapet, and a shaped gable. | II |
| Central Fire Station | Hatton Garden, Liverpool; 53.4096°N 2.9863°W | | 1895–98 | This is designed in Jacobean style. It is constructed in brick with stone dressings and partial facing, and has a slate roof. The fire station is a symmetrical building with three storeys and an attic. The main front has 18 bays, and a cornice runs along the top of the building. All the windows are mullioned and transomed. Other features include a three-stage tower, oriel windows, pediments, dormers, and a balustraded balcony. | II |
| Everton Library | St Domingo Road, Everton; 53.4257°N 2.9706°W | | 1896 | A branch library built in brick and stone, with a tiled roof. It is in two storeys with three gabled bays, and has an octagonal turret in the corner. The windows are mullioned and transomed, and there are four round columns at the entrance. | II |
| College of Further Education | Picton Road, Wavertree; 53.3991°N 2.9232°W | | 1898–99 | Originally a technical institute, then a college, and then offices, it is built in red brick with stone dressings and a slate roof. The building has two storeys, and extends for five bays, the first bay being canted with a gable containing a lunette. The entrance is in the second bay. It has a granite Ionic aedicule with rusticated columns, a frieze and a pediment with a tympanum containing a fanlight. The windows are mullioned and transomed. | II |
| Liverpool Town Hall | Water Street, Liverpool; 53.4072°N 2.9917°W | | 1899–1900 | Shelmerdine enlarged the Council Chamber to fill the ground floor, creating a recess for the Lord Mayor's dais. A consequence of this was that the north portico had to be rebuilt; this was done, reusing the original columns. | I |
| Toxteth Public Library | Windsor Street, Toxteth; 53.3950°N 2.9715°W | | 1900–02 | A branch library constructed in red brick with stone dressings and a slate roof. It is in a single storey with an attic. There are five bays on both Windsor Street and on Upper Parliament Street. On each face are two Venetian windows. The round-headed doorway is flanked by Ionic columns and pilasters, and above it is a projecting hood. In the centre of the roof is a lead cupola. | II |
| Wavertree District Library | Picton Road, Wavertree; 53.3993°N 2.9246°W | | 1902–03 | The library was designed in the style of the 17th and 18th centuries. It is built in red brick with stone dressings, and has a slate roof. The library is in a single storey, and has a symmetrical three-bay front. The outer bays project forward with gables, and each contains a three-light window, with a three-light lunette above. The central bay has an entrance flanked by four Ionic columns, with a pediment. Above this is a balustrade, and a recessed shaped gable containing a two-light window with a pediment. | II |
| St John's Gardens | Liverpool; 53.4089°N 2.9814°W | | 1904 | Following the demolition of St John's Church, Shelmerdine laid out the gardens in the former churchyard. The retaining wall, the gate piers, and the terrace wall are listed. The piers are rusticated and have entablatures. | II |
| West Derby Library | Green Lane, West Derby; 53.4205°N 2.9258°W | | 1904–05 | The library is built in brick with stone dressings and a slate roof, and is in a single storey. The library has four bays on each side, with a canted bay between them. The windows are mullioned and transomed. On one corner is an octagonal turret, with buttresses and an arcaded parapet. At the entrance is an Ionic porch with a frieze and a pediment. | II |
| Picton Baths | Picton Road, Wavertree; 53.399219°N 2.924178°W | | 1904–06 | Designed in collaboration with engineer W.R. Courts. Shelmerdine's facade uses 17th century motifs in an arts and crafts style. Compact facade, red brick and sandstone cross-wings with shaped gables and large unmoulded mullioned-and-transomed windows. | II |
| Hornby Library | William Brown Street, Liverpool; 53.4101°N 2.9803°W | | 1906 | The library was paid for by Hugh Frederick Hornby to house the books and prints he had bequeathed. It is in Baroque style, and consists of a five-bay hall with aisles created by an Ionic colonnade. The hall has a plaster barrel vault. Running round it is a balustraded balcony ending in Doric columns. Above this are Diocletian windows. | II* |
| City Hospital North | Longmoor Lane, Fazakerley; 53.4676°N 2.9351°W | — | 1906 | The hospital consisted of an axial complex of single-storey wards, residences, an administrative block, and a nurses' home. | U |
| Garston Library | Bowden Road, Garston; 53.3582°N 2.9060°W | | 1908 | The library shows the influence of the Arts and Crafts movement. It is rendered on a sandstone plinth, apart from some exposed stone in the middle. The library has a slate roof. Its front is symmetrical, with a large central gable containing a window, and half-timbered gablets to the sides. | II |
| Sefton Park Library | Aigburth Road, Liverpool; 53.3786°N 2.9473°W | | 1911 | This was the last of the branch libraries to be designed by Shelmerdine, and is in Tudor Revival style. The ground floor is in stone, partly roughcast, and the upper parts are timber-framed. It has large brick chimneystacks. The library was opened by Andrew Carnegie, and contains a plaque to commemorate this. | II |
