= St Leonard's Church, Chapel-le-Dale =

Church in North Yorkshire, England

Coordinates: 54°11′23″N 2°24′12″W

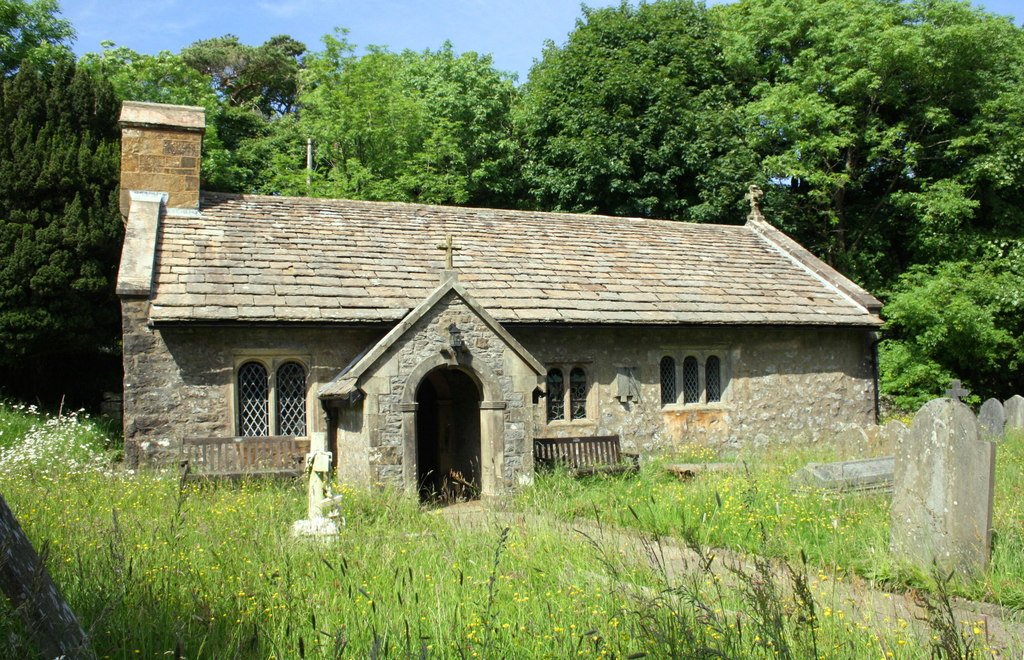
The church, in 2016

St Leonard's Church is an Anglican church in Chapel-le-Dale, a village in North Yorkshire, in England.

A chapel of ease in the valley was first recorded in 1595, but the current building dates to the late 17th century, and was altered in the 18th century. It was given its own parish in 1864, and was heavily restored in 1869. The building was grade II listed in 1958. A tablet commemorates workers who died while building the Settle to Carlisle line, about 200 of whom are buried in the churchyard.

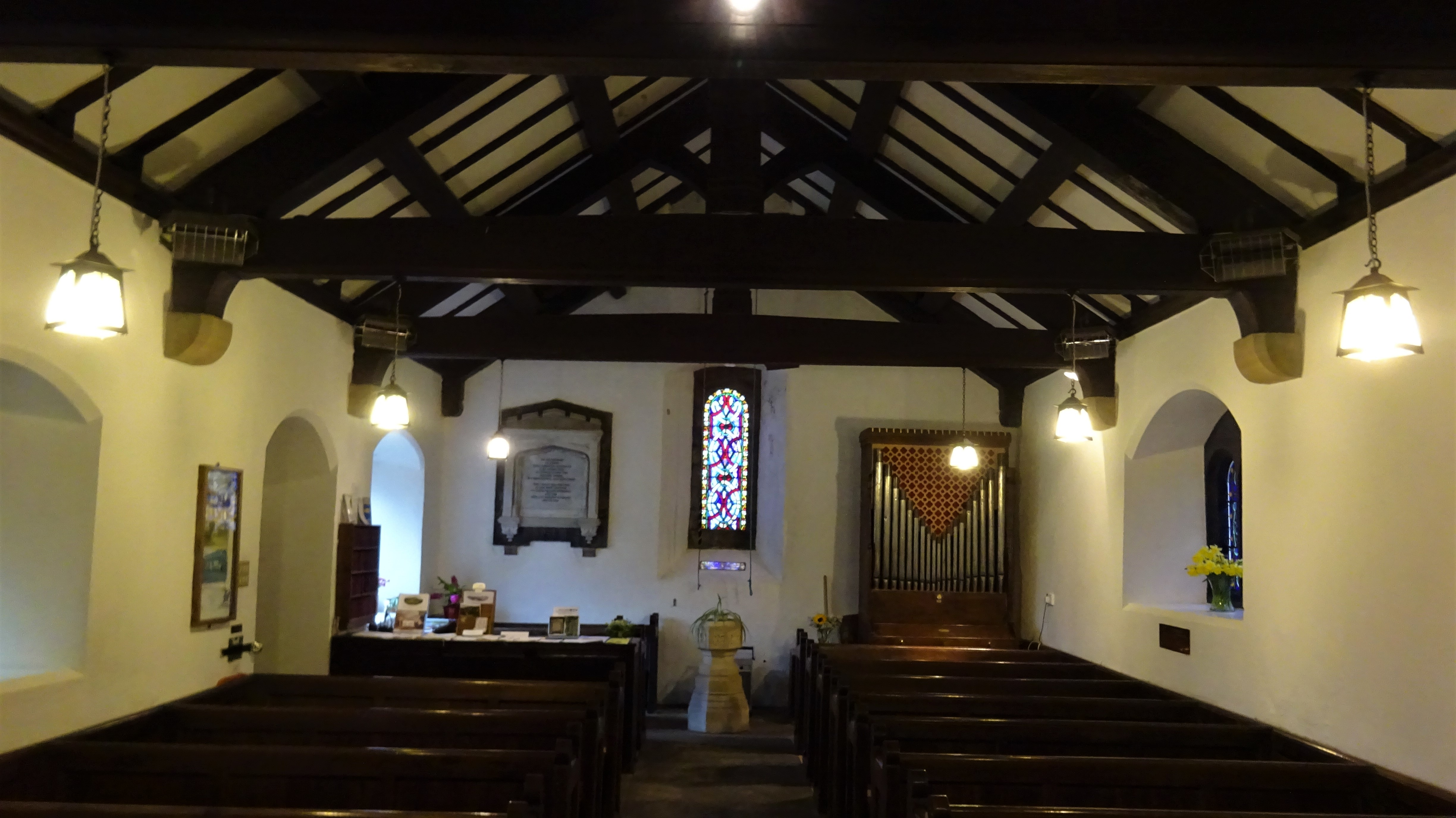
Interior view, from the entrance

The church is built of limestone and has a stone slate roof. It consists of a three-bay nave, a south porch, and a one-bay chancel. It measures 48 feet (15 m) by 20 feet (6.1 m). At the west end is a gabled and corbelled bellcote, with an open pediment on the west side, and a basket arch with a keystone to the east. On the south wall is a slate sundial with a gnomon. Inside is a mid-17th century altar rail.

== See also ==
- Listed buildings in Ingleton, North Yorkshire
