= St Mary's Church, Ingleton =

Church in North Yorkshire, England

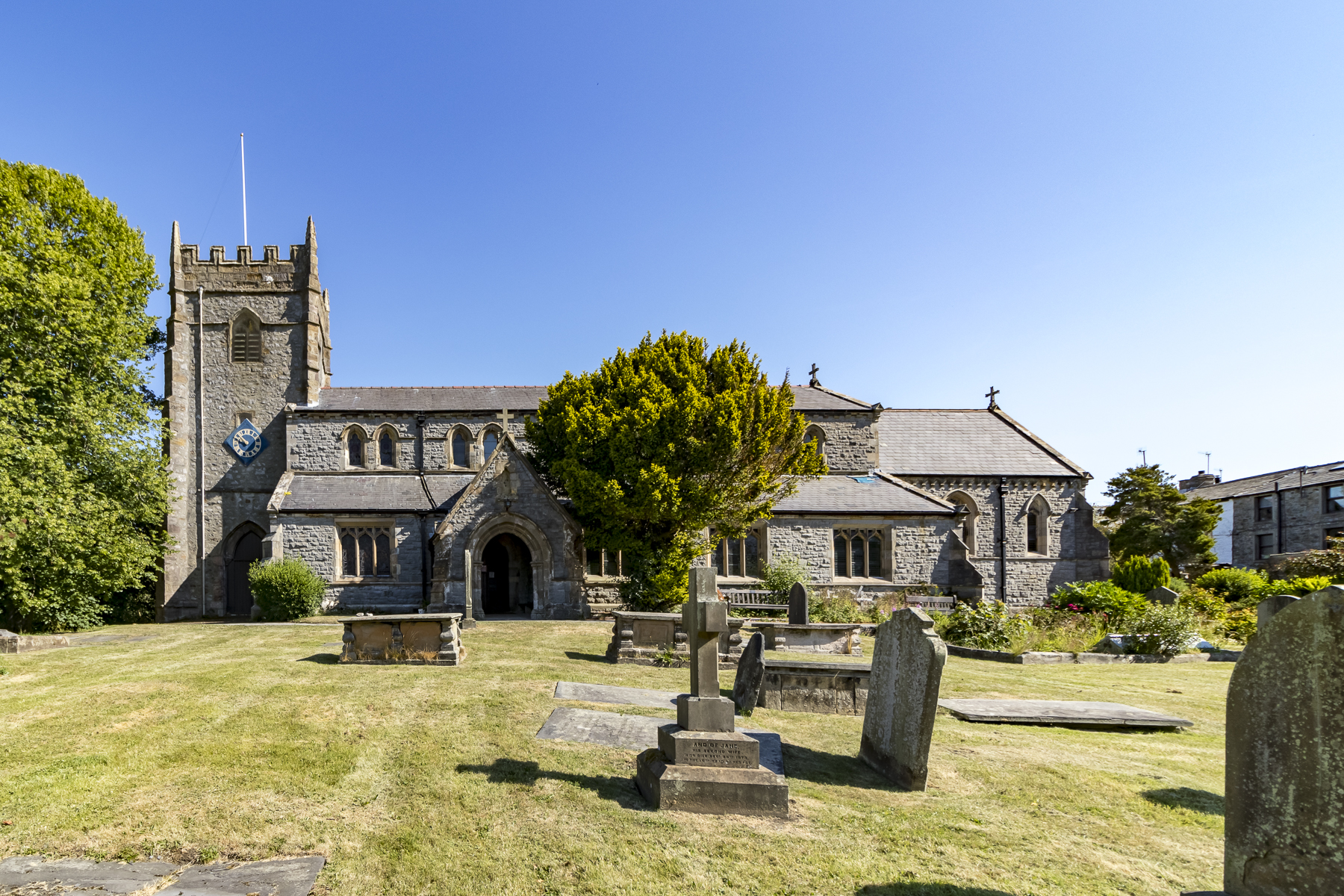
- The church, in 2018

- Location within North Yorkshire
- 54°09′15″N 2°28′06″W
- Location: Ingleton, North Yorkshire
- Country: United Kingdom
- Denomination: Church of England
- Website: ingleboroughchurches.org.uk/ingleton

History
- Dedication: St Mary the Virgin

Architecture
- Architect: Cornelius Sherlock
- Style: Decorated Gothic

Administration
- Province: York
- Diocese: Leeds
- Deanery: Bowland and Ewecross
- Parish: Ingleton, North Yorkshire

Listed Building – Grade II*
- Official name: Church of St Mary the Virgin
- Designated: 20 February 1958
- Reference no.: 1252726

St Mary's Church is the parish church of Ingleton, North Yorkshire, a village in England.

There was a church on the site by the 12th century. The oldest part of the current building is the tower, dating from the 15th century. Between 1886 and 1887 the remainder of the church was rebuilt, to a Decorated Gothic-style design, by Cornelius Sherlock. The building was grade II* listed in 1958.

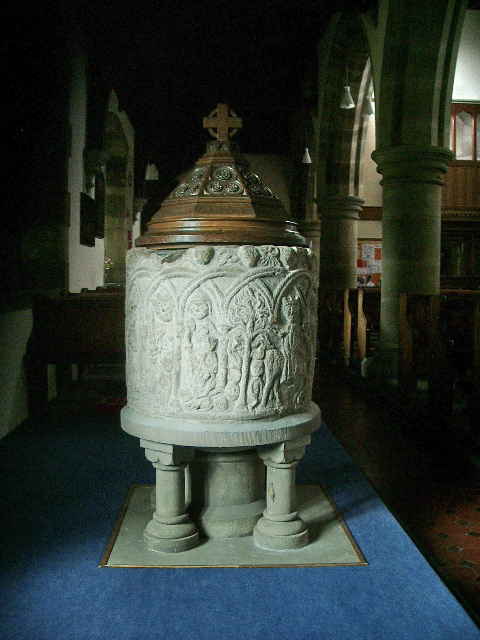
The font

The church is built of stone with a slate roof, and consists of a nave with a clerestory, north and south aisles, a south porch, a chancel with a north vestry, and a west tower. The tower has three stages, diagonal buttresses, a west doorway with a pointed arch, a chamfered surround and a hood mould, above which is a three-light window, a south clock face, two-light bell openings, a string course, and an embattled parapet with corner finials. Inside, some fragments of wall painting survive, but the highlight is the 12th century font, described by Nikolaus Pevsner as "one of the best in the West Riding". It is cylindrical, and is carved with an arcade design, with fourteen Biblical scenes. It was rediscovered in the 18th century, cleaned and brought back into use in 1830, and mounted on its current base in 1858.

== See also ==
- Grade II* listed churches in North Yorkshire (district)
- Listed buildings in Ingleton, North Yorkshire
