= Baitul Lateef Mosque =

Mosque in Liverpool, England, United Kingdom

Coordinates: 53.42454°N 2.95536°W

Bait-ul-Lateef Mosque
- مسجد بیت اللطیف
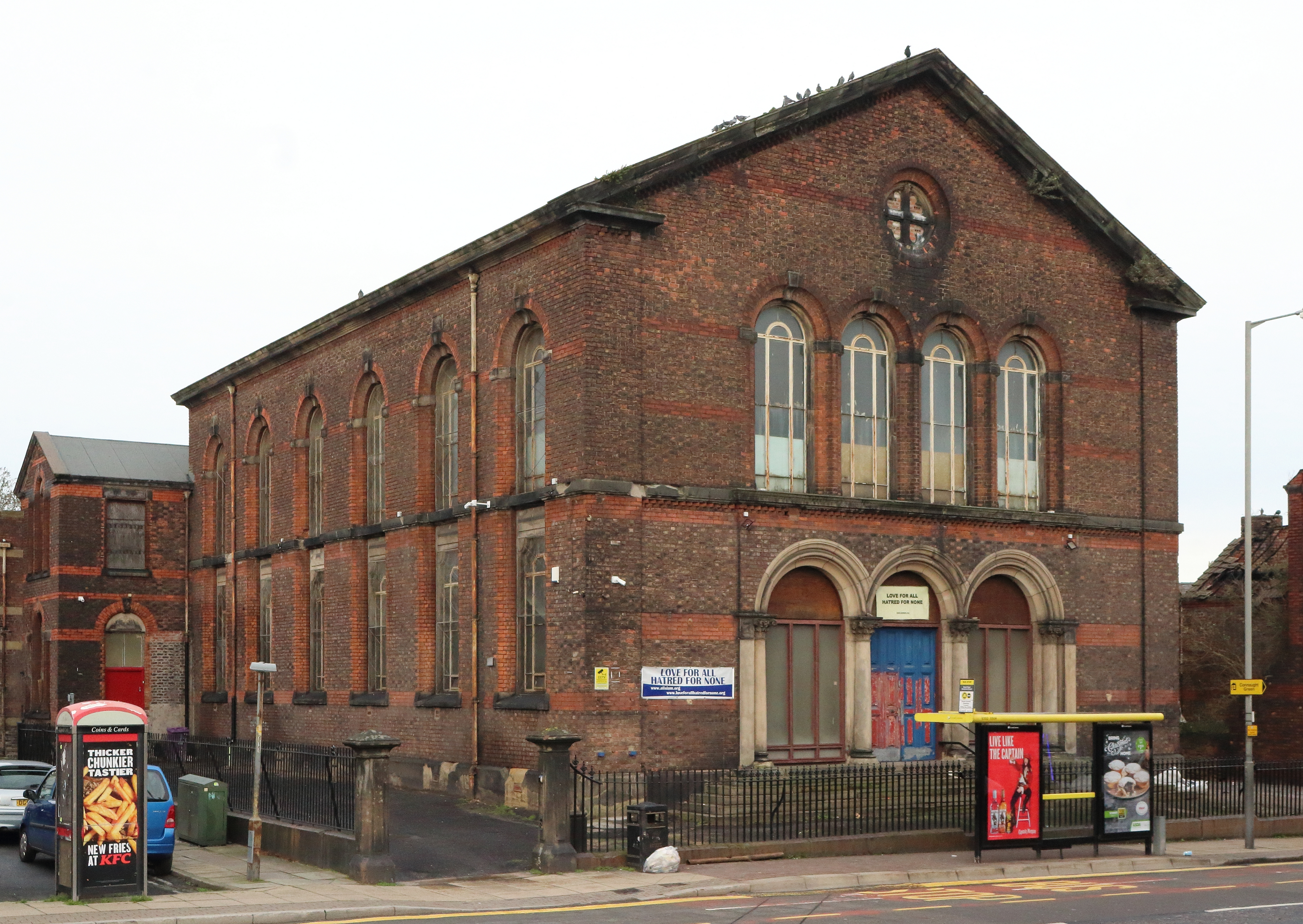

Religion
- Affiliation: Ahmadiyya

Location
- Location: 309 Breck Road, Liverpool, L5 6PU
- Country: United Kingdom
- Interactive map of Bait-ul-Lateef Mosque

Architecture
- Established: 2016

Website
- Ahmadiyya UK

The Baitul Lateef is a mosque located in Liverpool, which is used by the members of the community living in the area. The building originally existed as a church named Richmond Baptist Church. The chapel was recorded in the National Heritage List for England as a Grade II listed building, having been designated on 14 March 1975, the lowest grade lowest of the three gradings given to listed buildings and is applied to "buildings of national importance and special interest".

== History ==
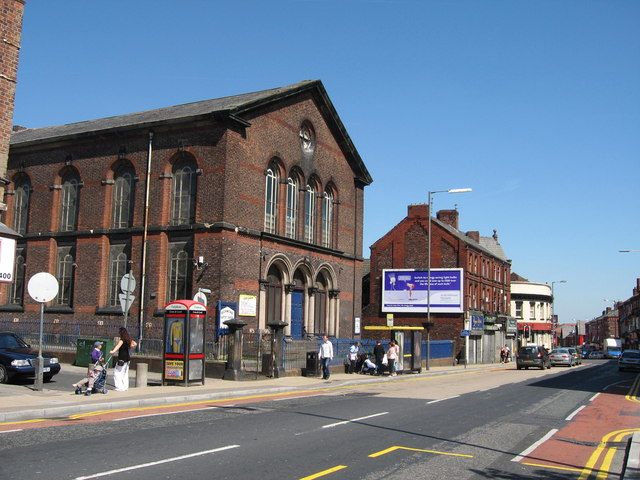
The former Richmond Baptist Church

The original building is a chapel that was built in 1864–65 and was designed by Sir James Picton and was constructed in common brick with red brick banding and stone dressings. It has a slate roof, is in two storeys, and has round-headed windows containing casements. On the entrance front is a three-bay arcade with Corinthian columns. In the gable above this is a wheel window.

Inside the former church, there were galleries on all four sides carried on fluted cast iron Composite columns. Its ceiling was flat and coffered. The west gallery and the space below it is separated from the rest of the building by late 20th-century walls.

From 2010 to early 2018 the fellowship met at Oakfield Methodist Church. Following an approach from the leadership of the Good News Mission the members of Richmond Baptist Church successfully refurbished the Mission buildings in Oakfield and are a thriving Christian community. On 11 February 2015, the building was purchased by Ahmadiyya Muslim Community in Liverpool. The original Richmond Baptist Church is now located at "The House" 27 Oakfield, a short distance from the original chapel.

== See also ==
- Grade II listed buildings in Liverpool-L5
