= Church of Our Lady of Reconciliation, Liverpool =

Roman Catholic church in Merseyside, England

Coordinates: 53.4175°N 2.9879°W

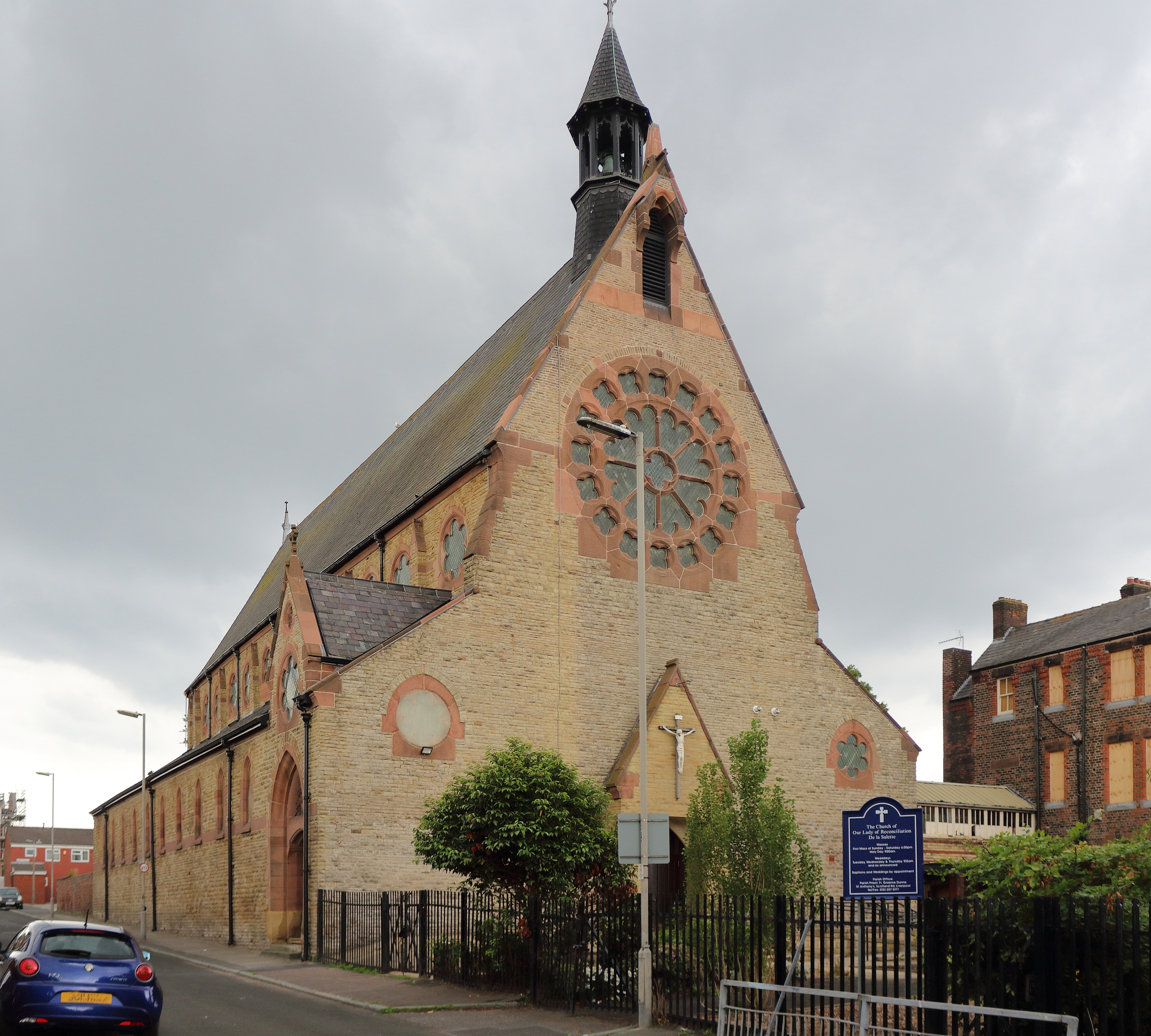
West end

The Church of Our Lady of Reconciliation is a Roman Catholic church in Eldon Street, Vauxhall, Liverpool, Merseyside, England. It is recorded in the National Heritage List for England as a designated Grade II listed building. (Note: This grade is the lowest of the three gradings given to listed buildings and is applied to "buildings of national importance and special interest".) (Note: Its full title is Church of Our Lady of Reconciliation de la Salette)

== History ==
The church was built in 1859–60, and designed by E. W. Pugin.

== Architecture ==
The church is constructed in buff stone with red stone dressings, and has a slate roof. Its plan consists of a nave and chancel in one vessel, with narrow aisles. It has a clerestory with sexfoil windows (with six heads) between buttresses, and an apsidal east end. There are also sexfoil windows along the side of the aisles. Around the chancel apse are lancet windows. At the west end of the church is a 20th-century porch, above which is a rose window, and a canopied louvred opening in the gable. On the west gable is an octagonal bellcote with a short spire. The entrance is at the west end of the north side, and includes the arms of the diocese in its tympanum. Inside the church are arcades carried on widely spaced round columns. Pugin designed the church to be large but economical; it provides seating for 1,800 people.

== See also ==
- Grade II listed buildings in Liverpool-L5
