= Everton Library =

Coordinates: 53°25′32.9″N 2°58′14.3″W

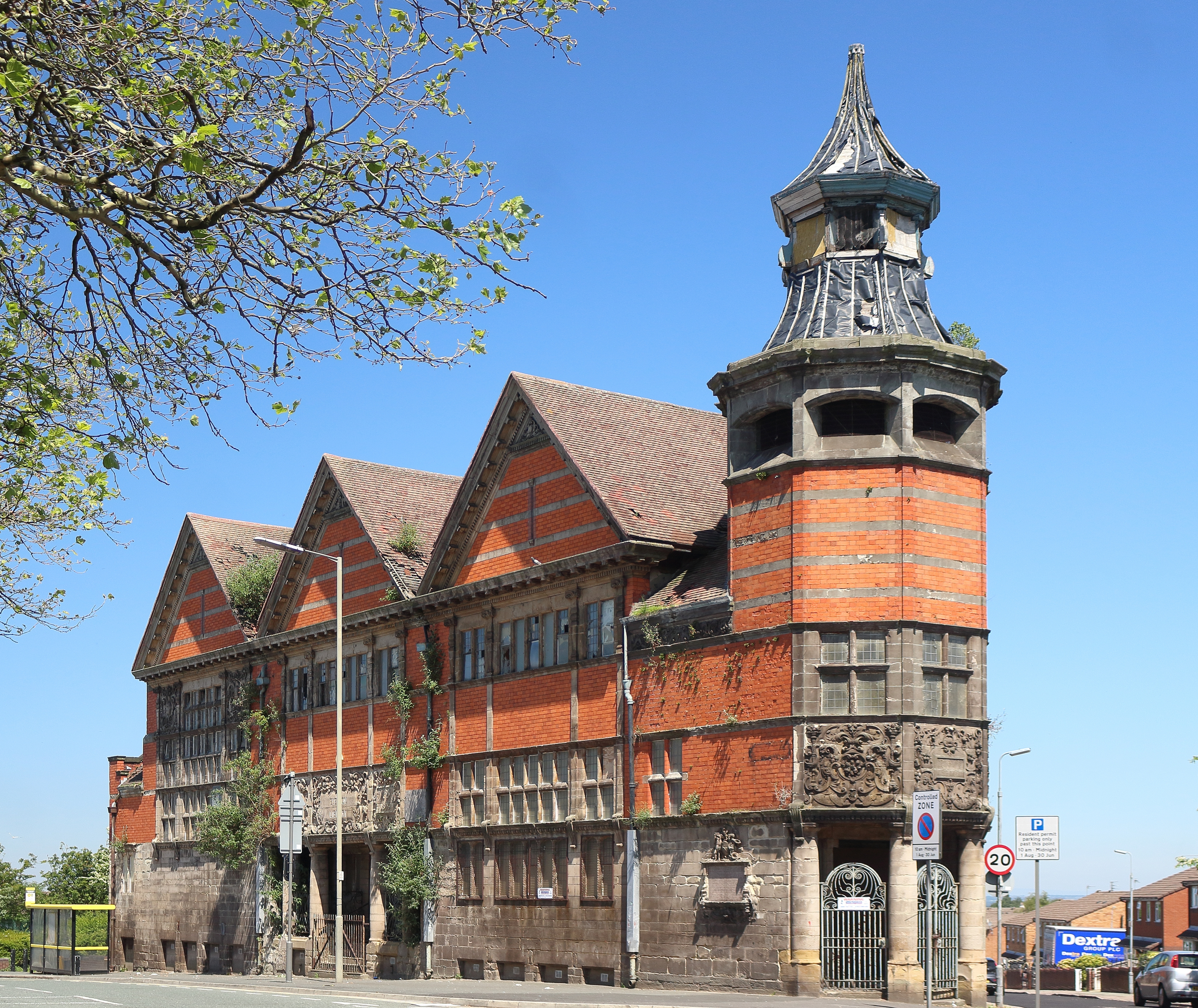
- Interactive map of Everton Library

General information
- Type: Disused library
- Architectural style: Free style
- Location: St Domingo Road, Liverpool, England, United Kingdom
- Completed: 1896

Design and construction
- Architect: Thomas Shelmerdine

Everton Library is a disused library building in Everton Brow, Liverpool. Designed by architect and Liverpool City Surveyor Thomas Shelmerdine and constructed in 1896, it remained in use as a library until 1999. It was used by various community groups up until 2006, and has been derelict since. There are plans in progress to convert the building for use as an arts, culture, heritage and enterprise centre. In September 2019, it was named on the Victorian Society's list of the top ten most endangered buildings in England and Wales.

== History ==
Upon its opening in 1896 it was one of the earliest public libraries in Liverpool. It is Grade II listed on account of its architectural quality and its role in the development of Liverpool's public library service. It was given listed status in July 1966. The building suffered severe vandalism during 2009 and emergency works had to be carried out to limit the damage caused by theft of rainwater goods and smashing of rooflights.

== Architecture ==
Built from brick and stone with a tiled roof, the building is built in a Jacobean/Arts and Crafts style and has an ornamental corner turret. The interior has decorative iron railings to balconies with circular iron stairs. It has a barrel shaped roof of glass panels over the main hall and shallow domed lights over a centre part. The Beacon Lane corner has squat octagon with 4 columns, iron gates, ornamented stone panels, upper windows, and concave sided turret short spire.

== Redevelopment ==
Plans for redeveloping the building as a cultural hub were proposed in 2014 but were put on hold due to finances. Plans were restarted in 2016 with a proposal to turn the building into an arts, culture, heritage and enterprise centre but nothing came to fruition. In November 2018 it was announced that a local property and hotel group were interested in restoring the building for use as a youth centre and community hub, but the plans came to nothing. The council signed off £920,000 worth of essential repairs in December 2021, but local campaigners claim that the building is still suffering from problems with the roof and windows and with water ingress. Preserving the building is still a commitment of the council but they claimed that funding was an issue, with a bid for 'Levelling Up' funding to be used towards the project being rejected by the government.

== See also ==
- Architecture of Liverpool
