= Thomas Shelmerdine =

British architect

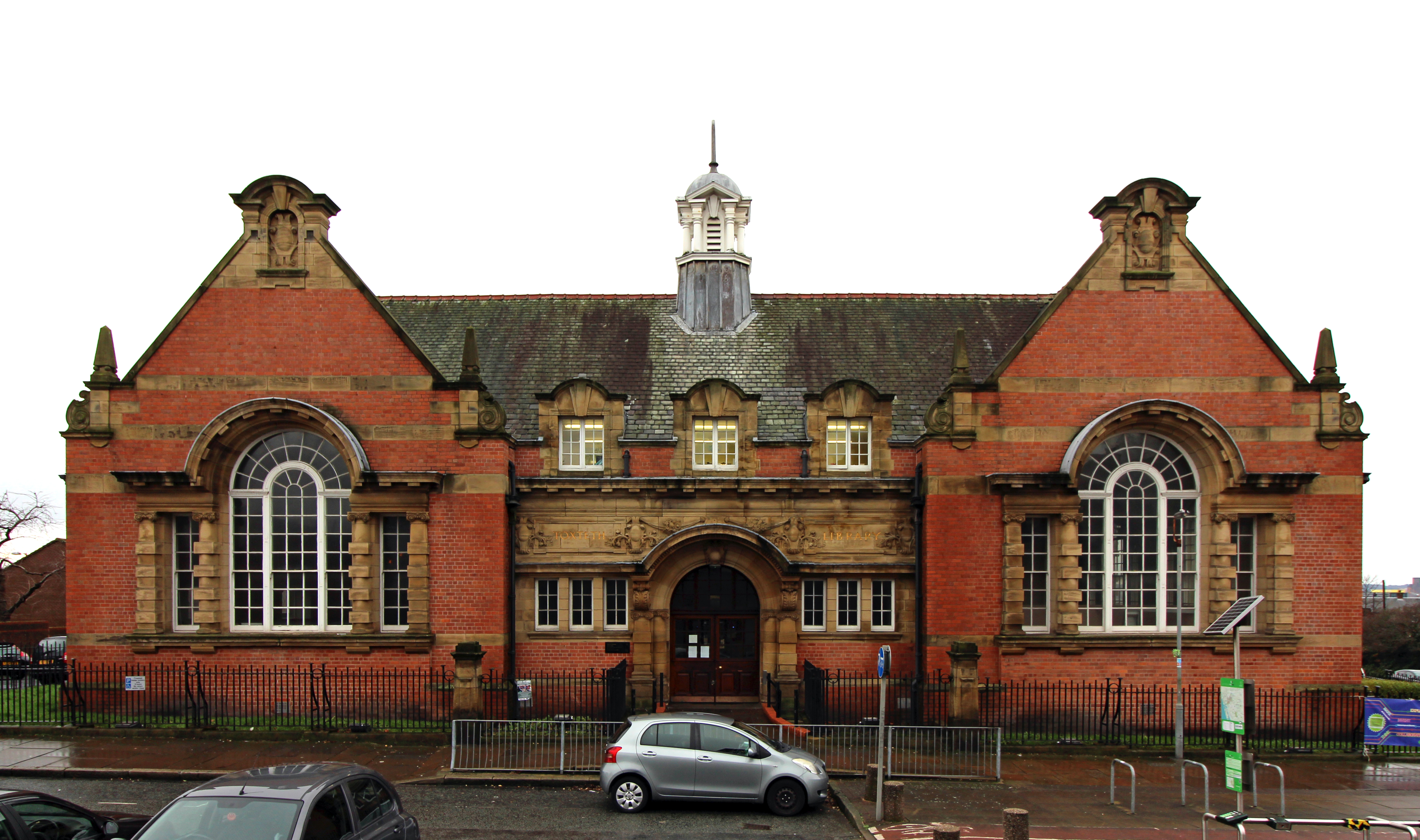
Toxteth library, designed by Thomas Shelmerdine

Thomas Shelmerdine (1845–1921) was an English architect who was appointed to the post of City Surveyor of Liverpool in 1871 at the age of 26. He is the youngest person to have held that post.

Shelmerdine was the architect of several buildings in Liverpool. In 1875, he designed the gates and lodge at the Ullet Road entrance to Sefton Park. In 1890 he drew the plans for Kensington Library. This is an asymmetrical building, in brick and dressed stone, with a white cupola. In 1896 he designed Everton Library in Heyworth Street, in grimshell and redbrick, on a triangular site. Toxteth Library, in Windsor Street, a balanced English Renaissance style building, was set out by him in 1902. By 1904 he was setting out St John's Gardens at the back of St George's Hall, which now contain interesting examples of Victorian and Edwardian public sculpture. In 1906 he was working on the Hornby Library, designed to house Hugh Frederick Hornby's collection of books and prints. His last design for a library was that at Sefton Park, on Aigburth Road. The ground floor is of ashlar and roughcast, the first is half-timbered. It was the last of Thomas Shelmerdine's libraries, and was completed in 1911.

His brother Henry Shelmerdine (1856–1935) was also an architect, who spent most of his career working for the Lancashire and Yorkshire Railway.

== See also ==
- List of architectural works by Thomas Shelmerdine
