= Cornelius Sherlock =

British architect

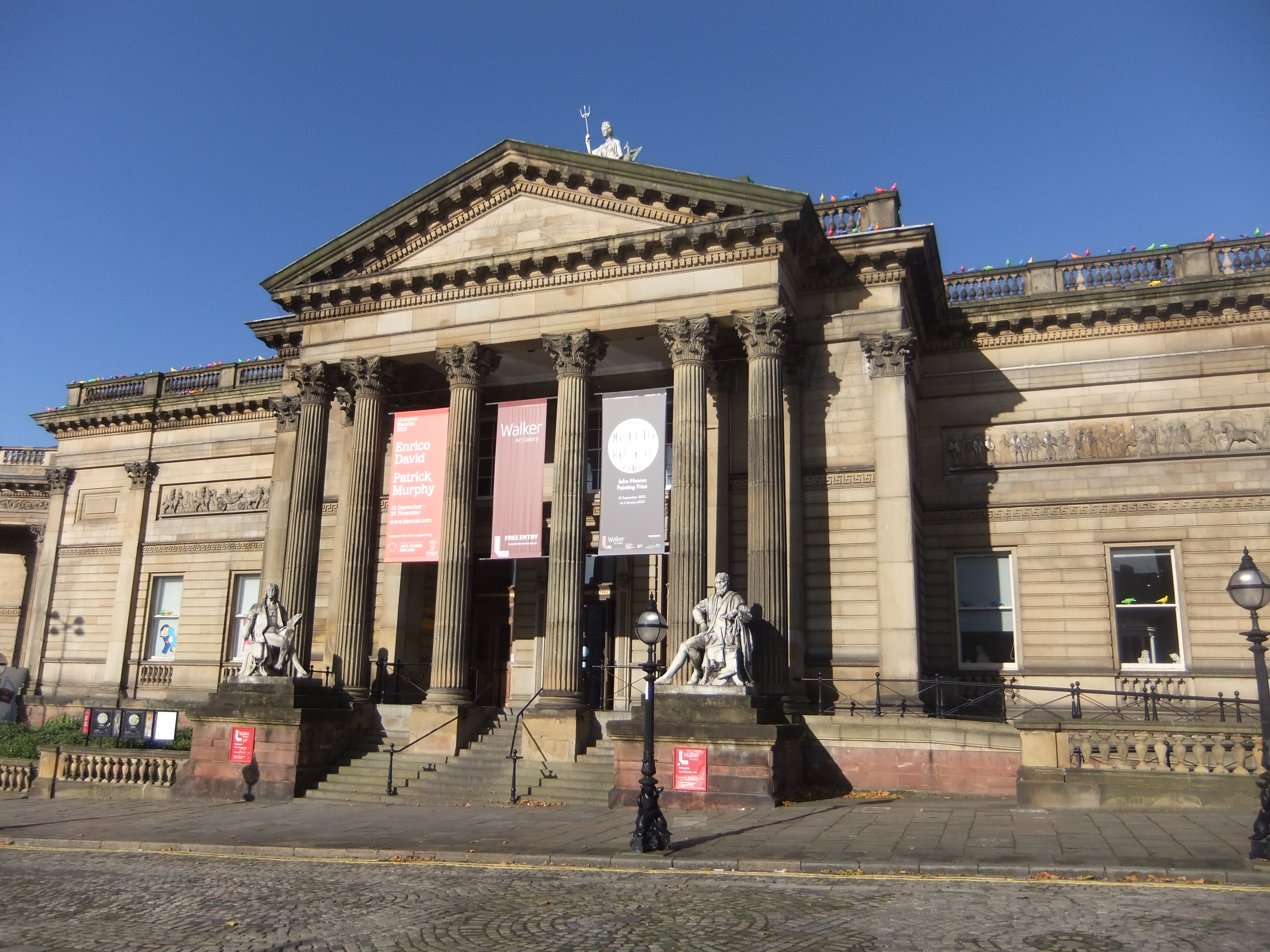
The Walker Art Gallery, Liverpool

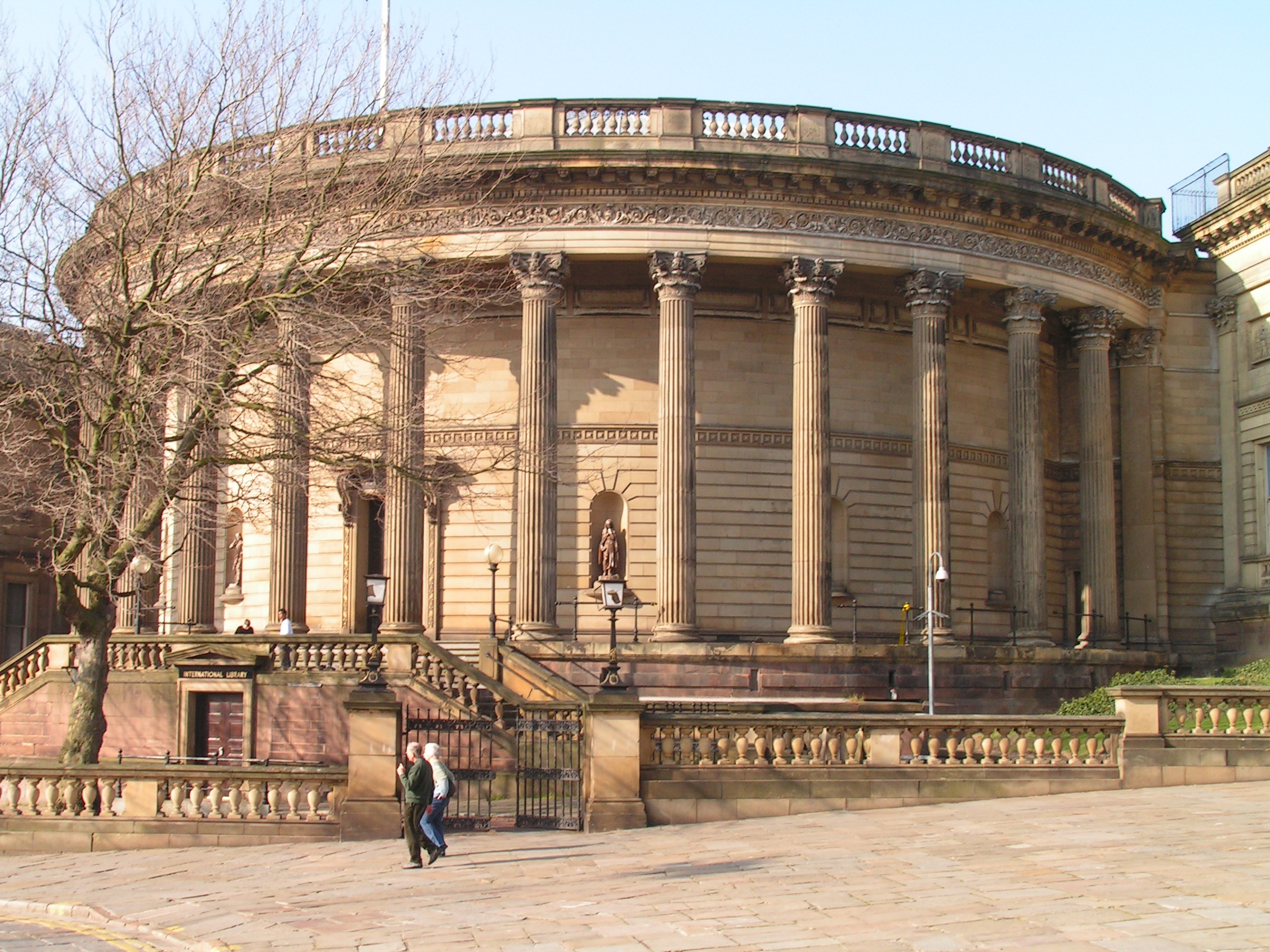
The Picton Reading Room, Liverpool

Cornelius Sherlock (bapt. 28 February 1823 – 20 January 1888) was a British architect who was active in Liverpool in North West England in the late 19th century.

Sherlock is best known as one of the architects responsible for the Walker Art Gallery in Liverpool, one of the main buildings in the area around William Brown Street and a celebrated example of High Victorian Neoclassical buildings.

== Biography ==
Cornelius Sherlock was born in Liverpool to Thomas and Anne Sherlock, and was baptised on 28 February 1823. He was apprenticed to the influential Liverpudlian architect Peter Ellis (1805–1884), who designed the Oriel Chambers. Sherlock lived in Canning Street and worked in initially at 22 King Street, before moving his offices to Manchester Buildings in Tithebarn Street. In 1867, he took up residence at Elm House in Childwall, where he remained for the rest of his life. Sherlock became a member of the Historic Society of Lancashire and Cheshire in 1850 and he was made a Fellow of the Royal Institute of British Architects in 1878.

In 1866, Sherlock was commissioned by the politician and brewing magnate Andrew Barclay Walker to build his Tudor Revival private residence, Gateacre Grange, on Rose Brow in Gateacre, Liverpool. Walker employed Sherlock again in 1874 in his project to build an art gallery for the City of Liverpool. Sherlock, along with co-architect H. H. Vale, were presented by Lord Sandon to the Duke of Edinburgh at the laying of the foundation stone in 1874. Sherlock and Vale collaborated on the Walker Art Gallery project until Vale's suicide in 1875. After this date, Vale's name no longer appeared on architectural documentation and Sherlock claimed credit for the entire design.

Sherlock's work for Sir James Picton on extending the William Brown Library followed the opening of the Walker Art Gallery, and the Picton Reading Room opened in 1879. Sherlock's design, modelled on the Pantheon in Rome, was critically acclaimed. His choice of a Classical rotunda surrounded by a colonnade of Corinthian columns is considered a graceful solution to turn the corner of the street, and together with the Walker gallery and the Brown library, the Picton forms part of a Neoclassical ensemble that was acclaimed by the public library advocate Thomas Greenwood as "without doubt the finest pile of buildings for this purpose in the whole United Kingdom and Ireland".

Cornelius Sherlock went into partnership with fellow architects William James Wood and Herbert William Keef to open an architectural and surveyors firm, Sherlock, Wood and Keef at 51, South John Street, Liverpool. The firm was responsible for a number of prominent buildings in Liverpool, such as the Florence Institute ("The Florrie"), which was designed by Keef.

== Death ==
Cornelius Sherlock died on 20 January 1888 at Elm House. He was buried in the neighbouring churchyard of All Saints' Church, Childwall. The firm Sherlock, Wood, and Keef was officially dissolved by Cornelius's widow, Jane Rebecca Sherlock and the surviving partners on 2 August 1889.

== Works ==
- Conversion of Welsh Methodist Chapel to Victorian Turkish baths, Mulberry Street, for the Oriental Baths Company of Liverpool (1861)
- Queen Hotel, Chester, rebuilding with Thomas Mainwaring Penson (1862)
- Gateacre Grange, Gateacre, Liverpool (1866)
- St. Stephens Church, Gateacre, Liverpool (1874)
- The Picton Reading Room, Liverpool (1875)
- The Walker Art Gallery, with H. H. Vale (1877)
- St Mary's Church, Ingleton, North Yorkshire (1886)
