= Picton Reading Room and Hornby Library =

Library in Liverpool, England

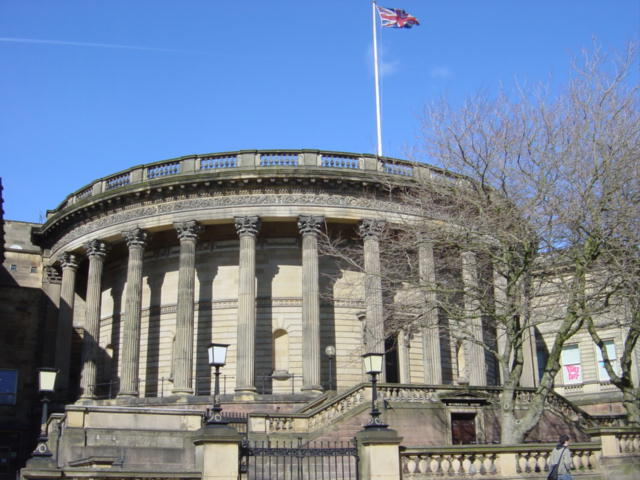
- Picton Reading Room, William Brown Street
- Interactive map of the Picton Reading Room and Hornby Library area

General information
- Location: William Brown Street, Liverpool, England
- Coordinates: 53°24′35.50″N 02°58′49″W
- Construction started: 1875
- Completed: 1906

Design and construction
- Architects: Cornelius Sherlock (Picton Reading Room); Thomas Shelmerdine (Hornby Library)
- Designations

Listed Building – Grade II*
- Official name: Hornby Library Picton Reading Room
- Designated: 28 June 1952
- Reference no.: 1359620

The Picton Reading Room and Hornby Library is a Grade II* listed building on William Brown Street in Liverpool, England, which now forms part of the Liverpool Central Library.

The chairman of the William Brown Library and Museum, Sir James Picton, laid the foundation stone of the Picton Reading Room in 1875. It was designed by Cornelius Sherlock, and modelled after the British Museum Reading Room, and was the first electrically lit library in the UK. It was completed in 1879 formally opened by the Mayor of Liverpool, Sir Thomas Bland Royden. The front is semicircular with Corinthian columns, and the shape was chosen by the architect to cover the change in the axis of the row of buildings at this point. The Hornby Reading Room (named after Hugh Frederick Hornby) by Thomas Shelmerdine was added in 1906. It stands behind the older building and the interior is decorated in the Edwardian Imperial style.

Picton Reading Room and Hornby Library is recorded in the National Heritage List for England as a designated Grade II* listed building.

== Gallery ==
=== Picton Reading Room ===
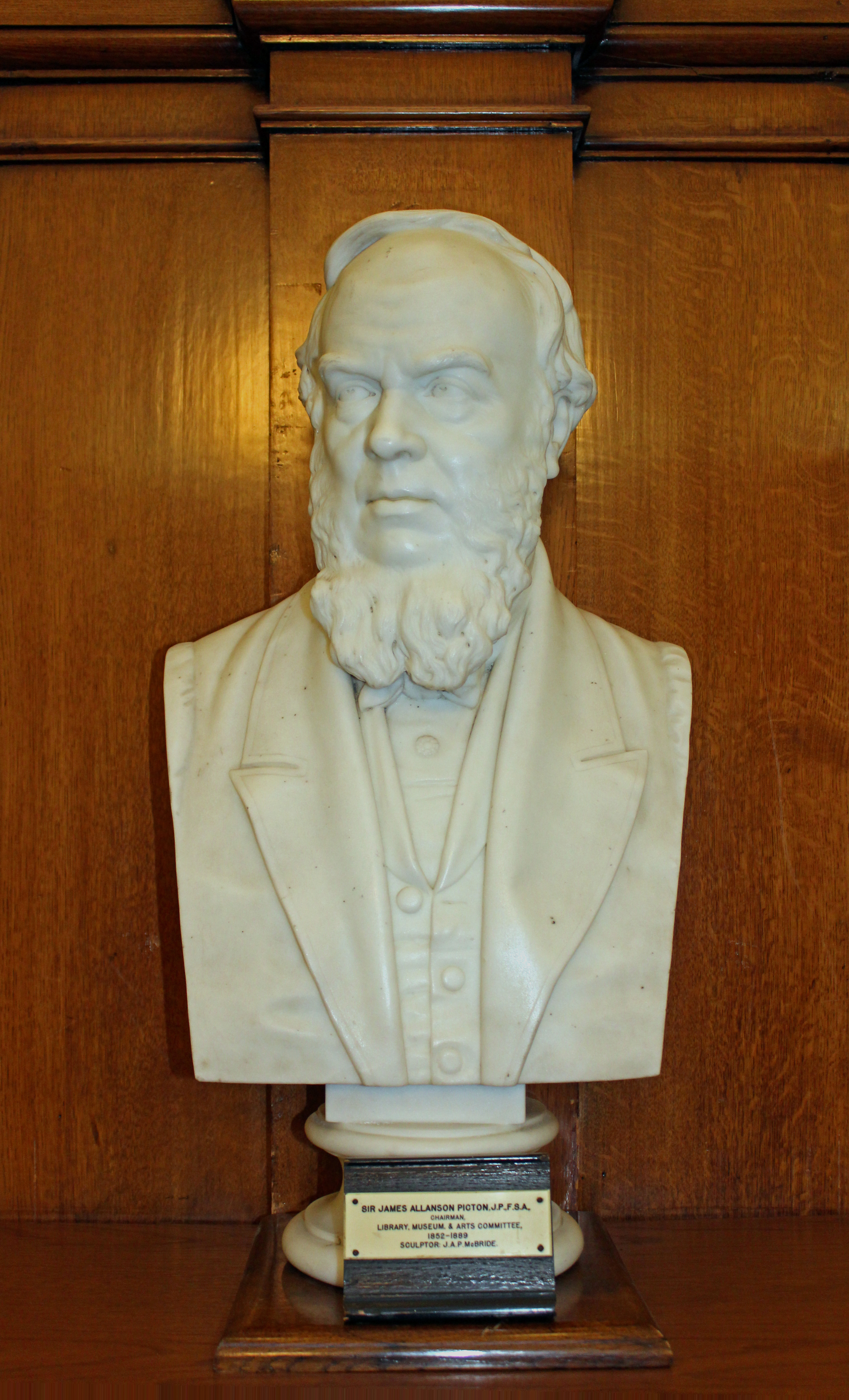
Bust of Sir James Picton

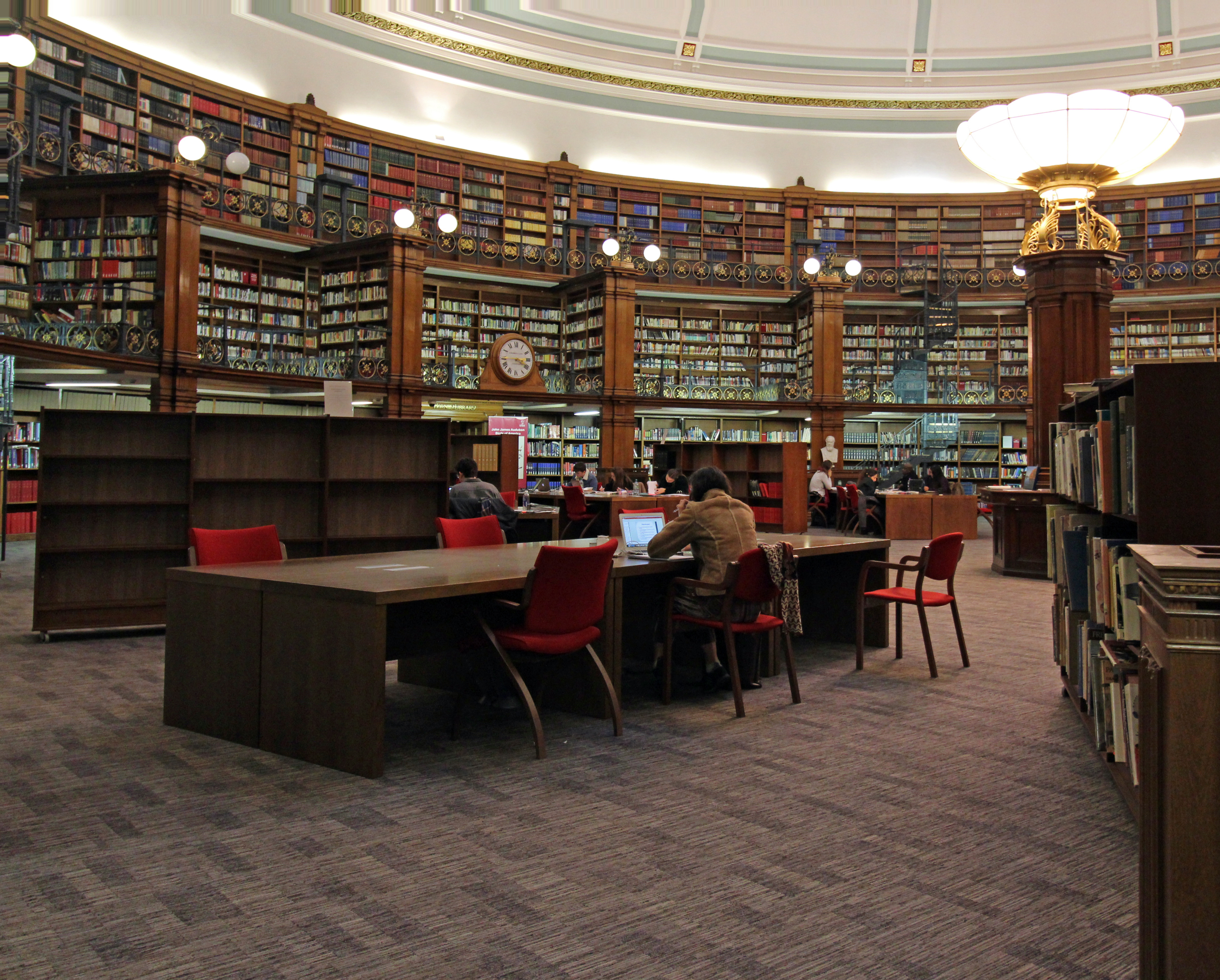
View of the ground floor

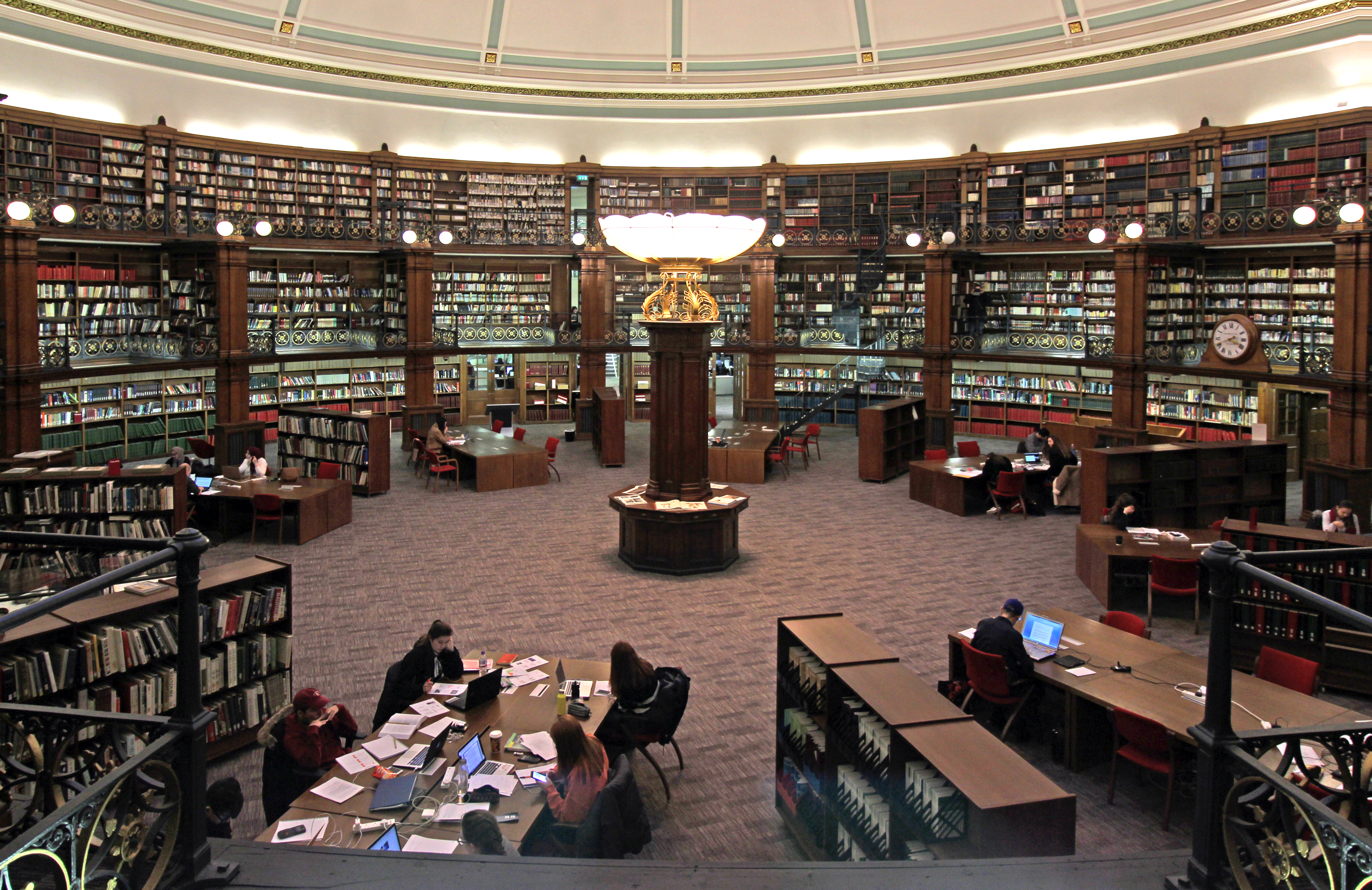
Seen from the gallery

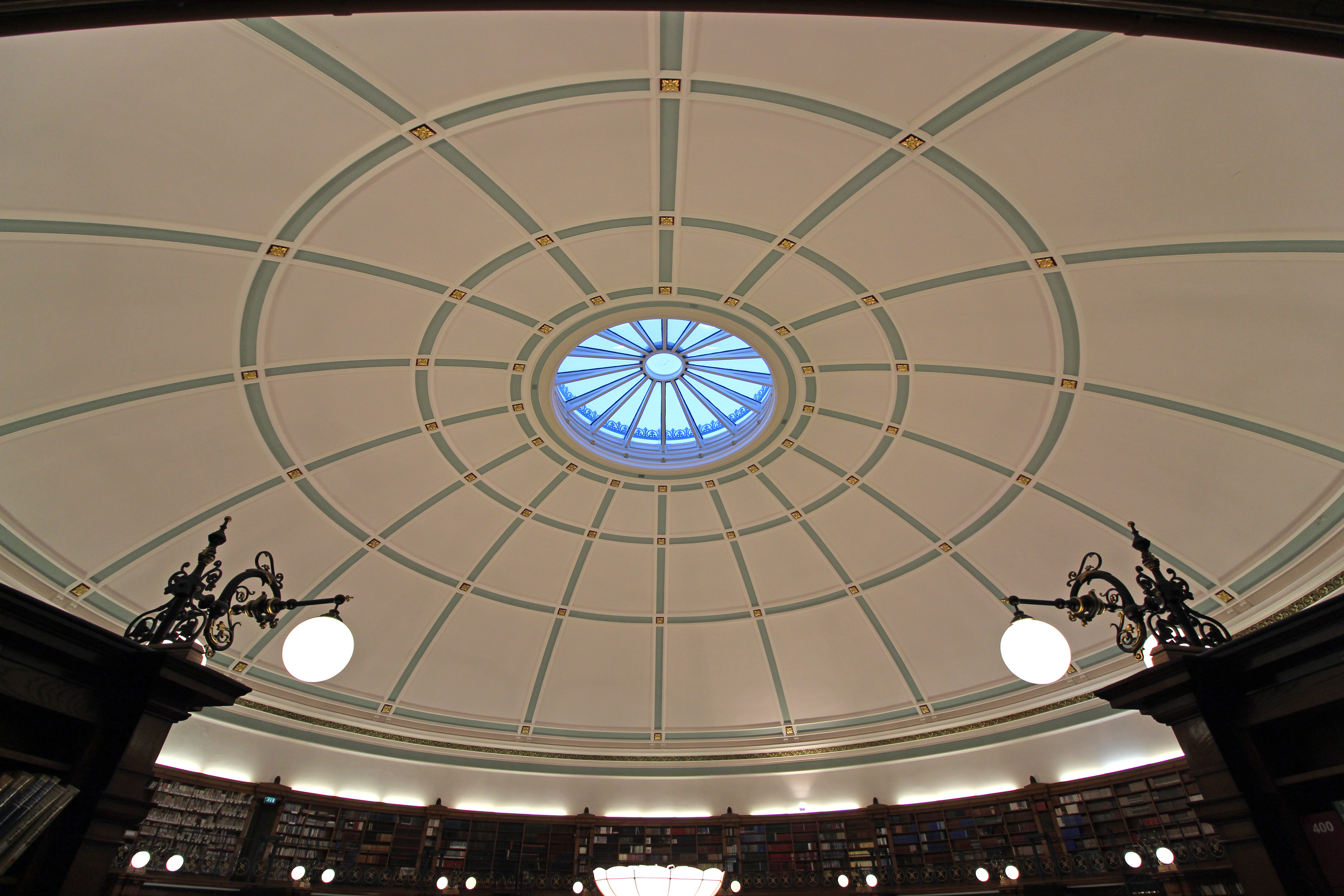
Interior of the dome

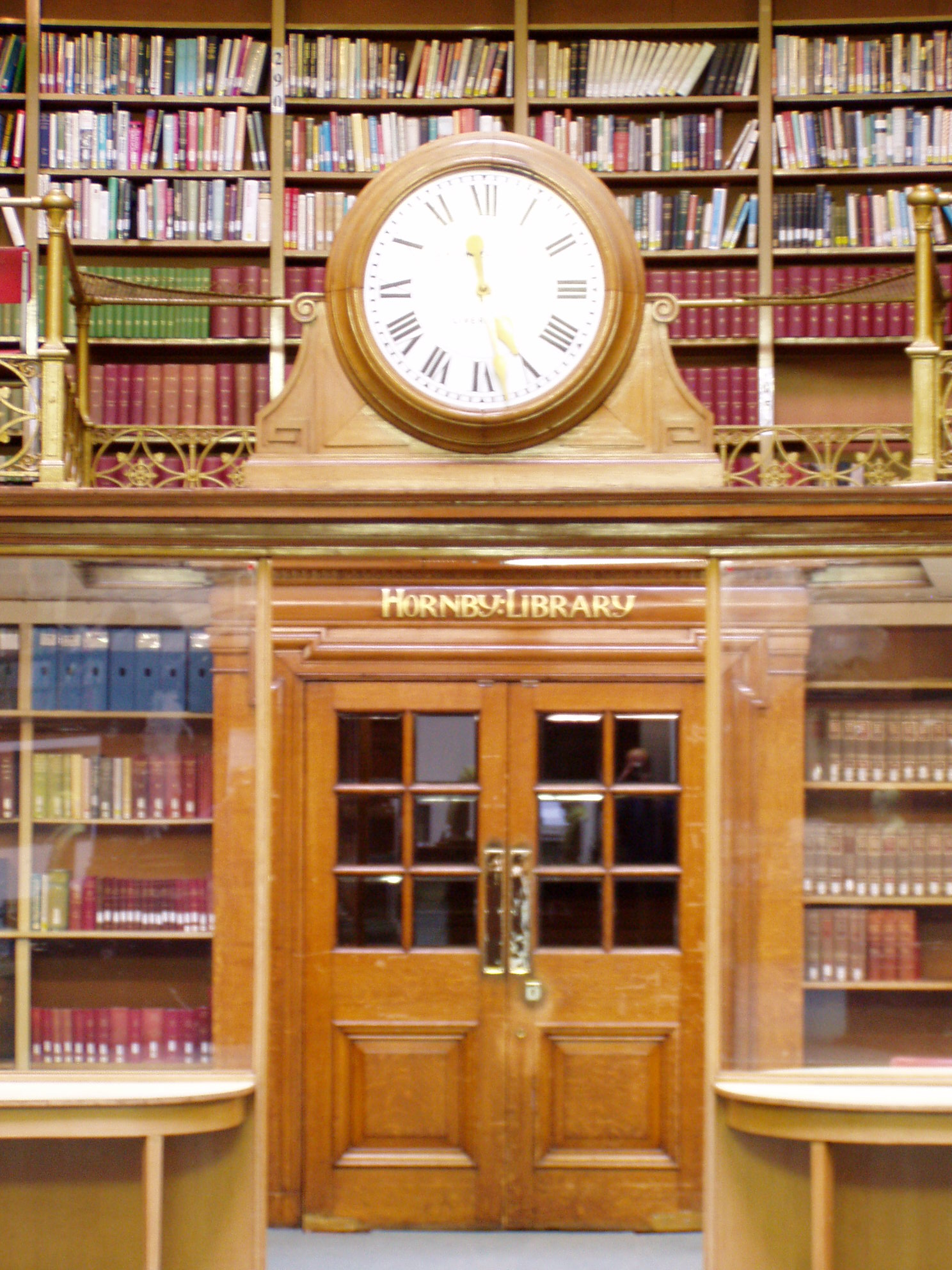
Doors to Hornby Library

=== Hornby Library ===
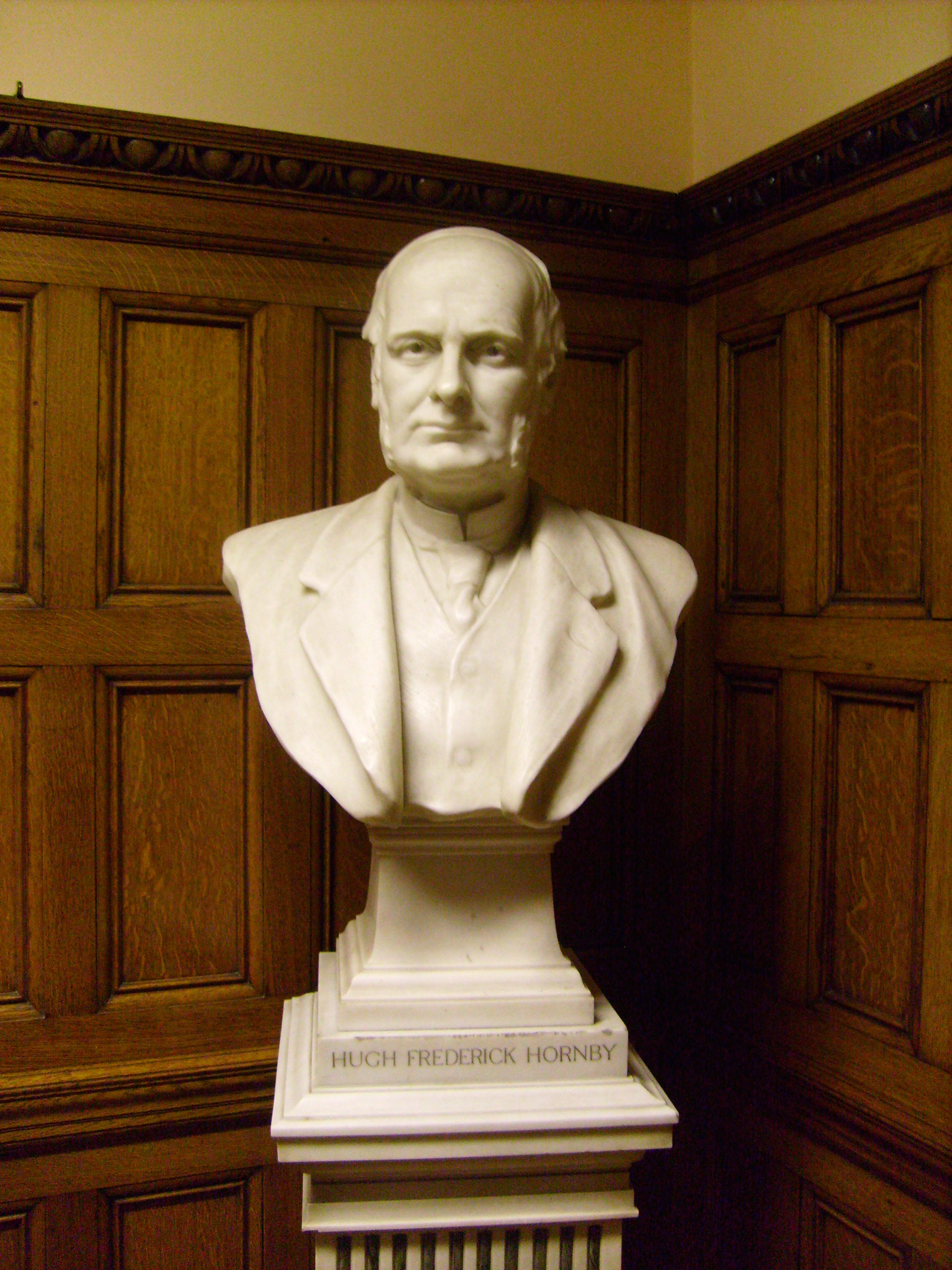
Bust of Hugh Frederick Hornby

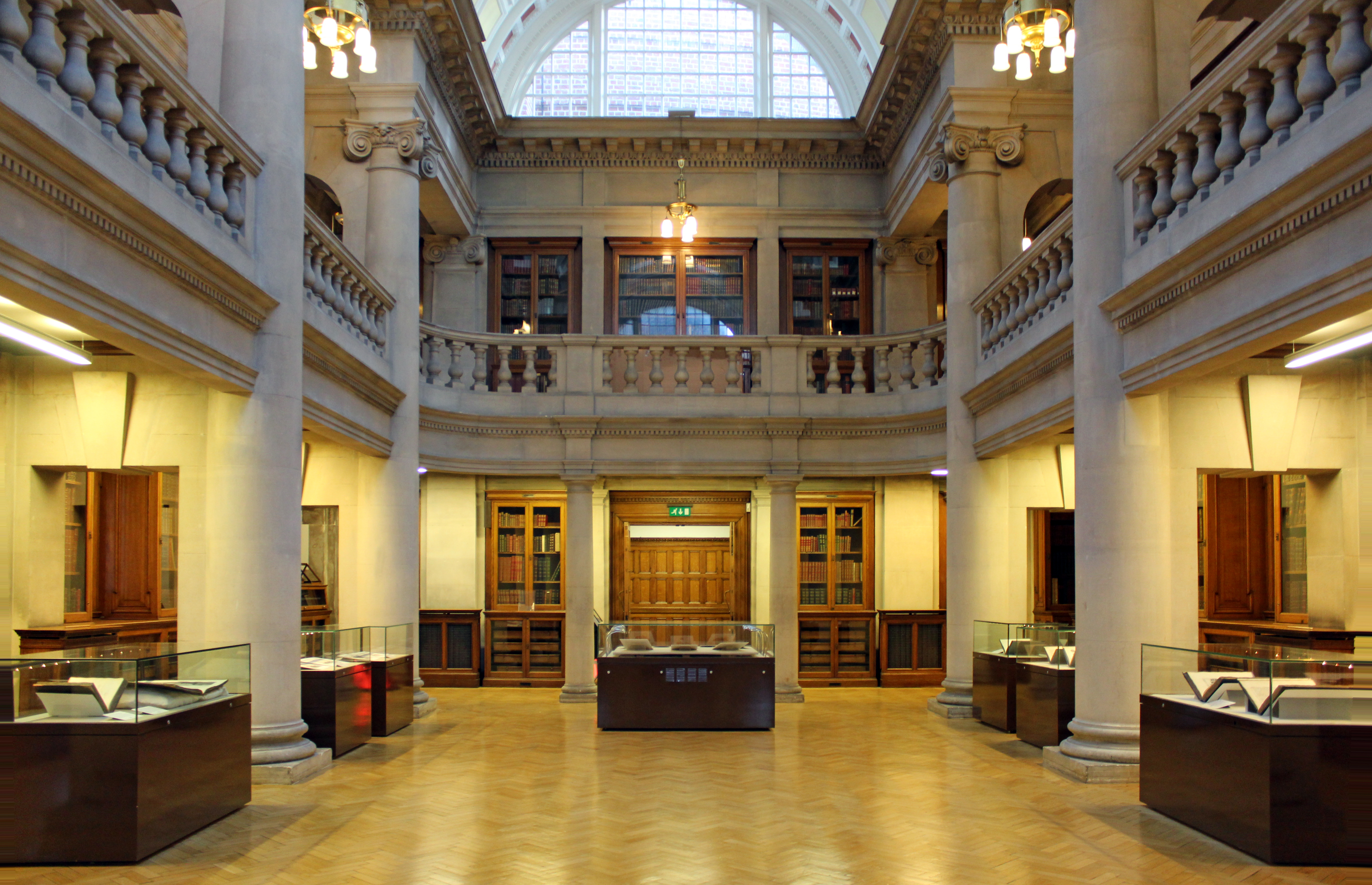
Library interior

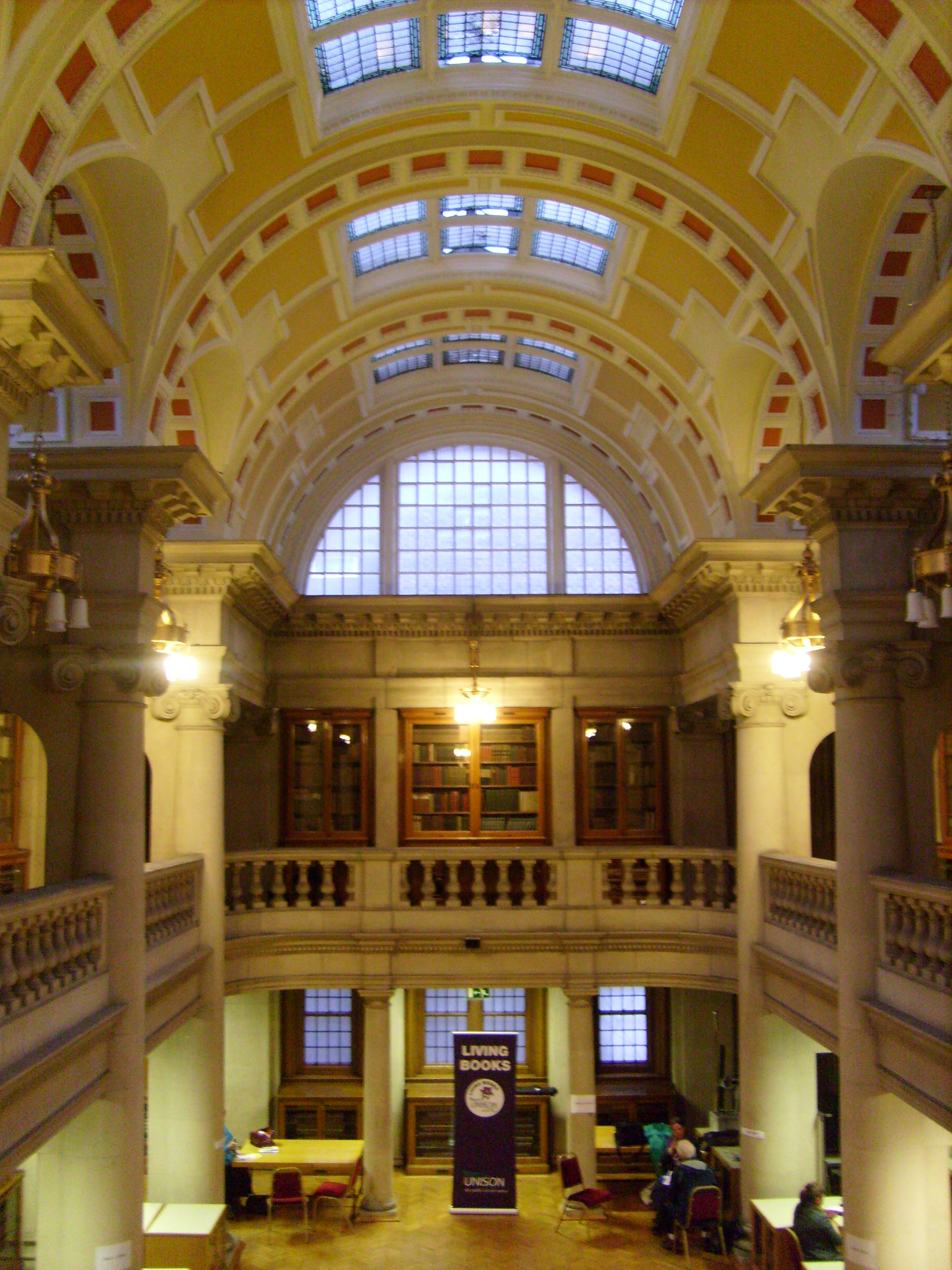
View from first floor gallery

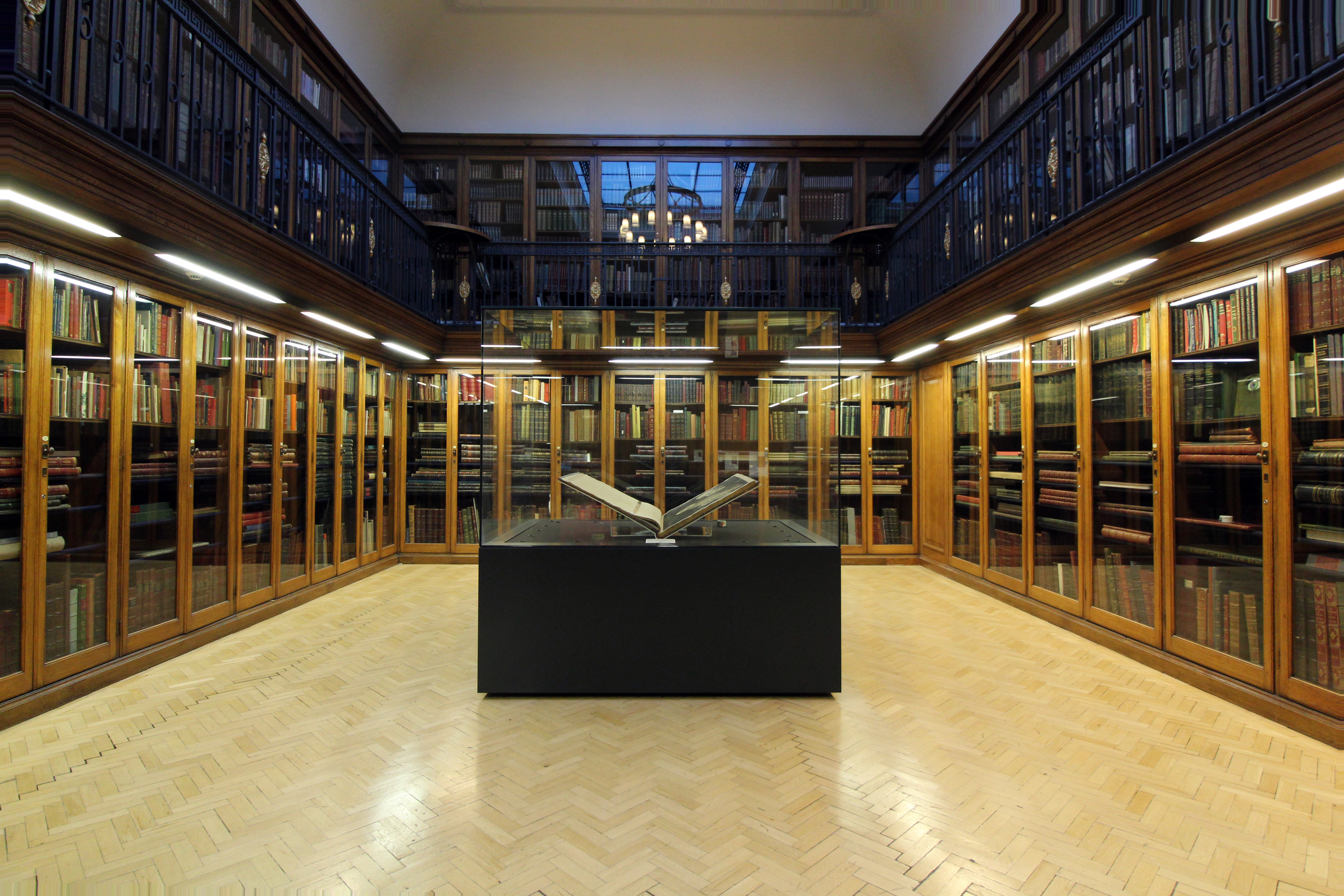
The Oak Room, housing a copy of Audubon's The Birds of America

== See also ==
- Architecture of Liverpool
- Grade II* listed buildings in Liverpool – City Centre
- List of libraries in Liverpool
