= Richard Thornton (disambiguation) =

Richard Thornton (1776–1865) was an English millionaire.

Richard Thornton may also refer to:

- Richard Lee (cricketer, born 1833) or Richard Napoleon Thornton (1833–1876)
- Richard Thornton (cricketer) (1853–1928), English first-class cricketer
- Richard Thornton (landowner) (1922–2014), Lord Lieutenant of Surrey, England
- Richard Thornton (swimmer) (1969–2024), American 1980 Olympic swim team member, and swim coach for the San Ramon Valley swim club.
- Richard Thornton, American physician, namesake of Dr. Richard Thornton House, a house in Halifax County, Virginia, United States

== See also ==
- Dick Thornton (disambiguation)
- Richard Thornton Hewitt (1917–1994), British Army officer
- Richard Thornton Wilson (1829–1910), American investment banker
- Richard Thornton Wilson Jr. (1866–1929), American banker and businessman
