= Punch bowl (disambiguation) =

A punch bowl is a vessel in which punch is served.

Punch bowl may also refer to:

== Places ==
- Punch Bowl Falls, a set of waterfalls on Eagle Creek in Oregon, United States

== Arts, entertainment, and media ==
=== Music ===
- "Punch Bowl", 2008 song by Chris Thile and Punch Brothers from the album Punch
- The Punch Bowl (album), 2002 album by Seth Lakeman

=== Other uses in arts, entertainment, and media ===
- Pennsylvania Punch Bowl, a magazine published since 1899 at the University of Pennsylvania
- Punchbowl.com, a free web-based online invitations service and digital greeting cards site
- The Punch Bowl, a 1944 German film directed by Helmut Weiss
- The Punch Bowl (1959 film), a 1959 East German film, the original German-language title of which is Maibowle

== Pubs in England ==
- Old Punch Bowl, a 15th-century timber-framed building in Crawley
- Punch Bowl, Lancashire, an 18th-century pub near Hurst Green, demolished in 2021
- Punch Bowl, Salford, Greater Manchester
- The Punch Bowl, Blossom Street, York
- The Punch Bowl, Burton in Lonsdale, North Yorkshire
- The Punch Bowl, Low Row, North Yorkshire
- The Punch Bowl, Mayfair, London, since the 1750s
- The Punch Bowl, Stonegate, York, which originated as a coffeehouse in 1675
- The Punch Bowl Inn, Marton cum Grafton, North Yorkshire

== See also ==
- Bowl (disambiguation)
- Devil's Punch Bowl (disambiguation)
- Punch (disambiguation)
- Punchbowl (disambiguation)
