= All Saints Church, Burton in Lonsdale =

Coordinates: 54.1439°N 2.5356°W

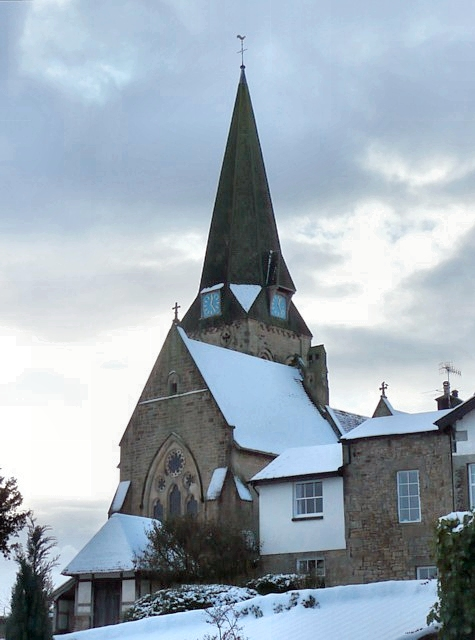
- All Saints Church, Burton in Lonsdale, from the northeast

- Location in North Yorkshire
- OS grid reference: SD 651,721
- Location: Burton in Lonsdale, North Yorkshire
- Country: England
- Denomination: Anglican
- Website: www.achurchnearyou.com/burton-in-lonsdale-all-saints/ All Saints, Burton in Lonsdale

History
- Status: Parish church

Architecture
- Functional status: Active
- Heritage designation: Grade II*
- Designated: 24 June 1988
- Architect: Paley and Austin
- Architectural type: Church
- Style: Gothic Revival
- Groundbreaking: 1868
- Completed: 1876

Specifications
- Materials: Sandstone, slate roof

Administration
- Province: York
- Diocese: Leeds
- Archdeaconry: Craven
- Deanery: Ewecross
- Parish: Burton in Lonsdale

Clergy
- Priest: Revd Denis Tate

All Saints Church is in the village of Burton in Lonsdale, North Yorkshire, England. It is an active Anglican parish church in the deanery of Ewecross, the archdeaconry of Craven, and the Diocese of Leeds. Its benefice has been united with that of St Oswald, Thornton in Lonsdale. The church is recorded in the National Heritage List for England as a designated Grade II* listed building. It stands in High Street, opposite the site of Burton in Lonsdale Castle.

== History ==
The church was built between 1868 and 1876, and designed by the Lancaster partnership of Paley and Austin. People note that it was seems a large church for what is a small town, but this is because it was thought the railway would come to the village and its population would expand. The first vicar of the church was Revd Frederick Binyon, father of the poet Lawrence Binyon.

== Architecture ==
All Saints is constructed in sandstone, with a slate roof. The porch is in wood, with a tiled roof. Its architectural style is Early English. The plan consists of a four-bay nave, a north aisle, a north porch, a chancel, a north vestry, and a tower occupying the position of a south transept. The tower is in three stages with buttresses. On its west side are single-light lancet windows in the bottom and middle stages. The top stage contains lancet bell openings. Around the top of the tower are corbel tables, and the tower is surmounted by a broach spire. There are two- and three-light windows in the nave, and a four-light window in the vestry. The chancel has two-light lancet windows on the north and south sides. The east window has three stepped lights, with smaller windows above. Inside the church, the arcade between the nave and aisle has a glass screen which was inserted in about 1970. In the chancel are a piscina and a double sedilia. There is a ring of six bells, all cast in 1870 by John Warner and Sons. The churchyard wall and gates are included in the listing.

== See also ==
- Grade II* listed churches in North Yorkshire (district)
- Listed buildings in Burton in Lonsdale
- List of ecclesiastical works by Paley and Austin
