= Punchbowl =

Punchbowl is an alternative spelling of punch bowl, a large bowl for serving drinks, or may refer to:

== Topography ==
- Punchbowl, a type of waterfall

== Places ==
- Punchbowl, Korea, valley and site of 1950s battles
- Punchbowl, New South Wales, suburb of Sydney, Australia
- Punchbowl, Tasmania, suburb of Launceston, Australia
- Punchbowl Cemetery, formally National Memorial Cemetery of the Pacific in Oahu, Hawaii, US
- Punchbowl Crater, volcanic remnant in Oahu, Hawaii, US

== Other uses ==
- Punchbowl, a fictional city in Stubbs the Zombie
- Battle of the Punchbowl, a 1951 engagement of the Korean War
- Punchbowl.com, an online invitations service and digital greeting cards site
- Tales From The Punchbowl, an album released in 1995 and as the fourth studio album by Primus

== See also ==
- Punch bowl (disambiguation)
- Devil's Punch Bowl (disambiguation)
