= Albert Thornton =

English cricketer

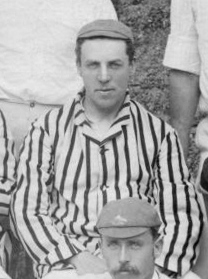
- Albert Thornton in 1888

Personal information
- Full name: Albert James Thornton
- Born: 17 January 1856; Folkestone, Kent
- Died: 14 June 1931 (aged 75); Kensington, London
- Batting: Right-handed
- Bowling: Right-arm slow underarm
- Role: All-rounder
- Relatives: Richard Thornton (grandfather); Richard Napoleon Thornton (father); Rev. Richard Thornton (brother); Walter Thornton (brother)

Domestic team information
- Years: Team
- 1879–1887: Devon
- 1880–1881: Sussex
- 1884–1891: Kent
- 1885: EJ Sanders' XI
- FC debut: 15 May 1879 Marylebone Cricket Club (MCC) v Sussex
- Last FC: 25 June 1891 Kent v Middlesex

Career statistics
Competition	First-class
Matches	30
Runs scored	947
Batting average	21.04
100s/50s	1/4
Top score	137
Balls bowled	1,406
Wickets	27
Bowling average	24.70
5 wickets in innings	0
10 wickets in match	0
Best bowling	4/20
Catches/stumpings	13/–
- Source: ESPNcricinfo, 5 December 2018

Albert James Thornton (17 January 1856 – 14 June 1931), (Note: Thornton's birth date is given as 17 January 1857 by Winchester College sources.) born Albert James Lee, (Note: Thornton's father was born Richard Lee and was the illegitimate son of Richard Thornton, one of the richest men of the 19th century. Lee changed his surname to Thornton in 1865 as a condition of his father's will. Alumni Oxoniensis gives the birth names of both of Thornton's brothers as Lee, although it does not make the connection between him and the remainder of the family.) was an English amateur cricketer who played first-class cricket between 1879 and 1891. Thornton played mainly for Kent County Cricket Club as well as amateur teams in Kent, Devon, Sussex and Hampshire. He worked as a stockjobber and was the grandson of the 19th century millionaire Richard Thornton.

== Early life and professional career ==
Thornton was born at Folkestone in Kent, the second son of Richard Napoleon Thornton (Note: Carlaw refers to Thornton by the forename Alfred. No other sources does so.) and his wife Margaret. He was educated at Winchester College, where he played some cricket, and at St John's College, Oxford before going on to work in the London Stock Exchange. He was commissioned as a Lieutenant in one of the volunteer battalions in the Royal Sussex Regiment in 1885.

== Cricket career ==
Thornton played cricket for the Gentlemen of Devon and Devon County Cricket Club during the 1870s before making his first-class debut for Marylebone Cricket Club (MCC) against Sussex at Lord's in 1879. He played five times for Sussex in 1880 before moving to play for Kent between 1884 and 1891. Thornton made a total of 30 first-class appearances, 21 of which were for Kent. He was awarded his Kent county cap in 1886, a year after his brother Richard Thornton. He also played minor cricket for the Gentlemen of Hampshire.

Thornton was described in his Wisden obituary as a "good and free hitter and a useful lob bowler", batting right-handed and bowling underarm. He made one first-class century, scoring 137 for Kent against Sussex in 1887. He toured North America with EJ Sanders XI in 1885 as part of a team captained by his brother Richard, playing in both of the first-class matches on the tour against the Gentlemen of Philadelphia, and played in Portugal for a team led by Tom Westray in 1895.

== Family and later life ==
Thornton was married twice. He married his first wide, Ernestine Alice Hawker, in 1877 at Honiton in Devon, the county where his parents had owned property at Knowle near Sidmouth. The couple had four children, two sons and two daughters. Ernestine died and Thornton married Rose Thompson in 1905 at Fulham. The couple had a daughter. Thornton's brothers, Walter and Richard, both played first-class cricket, Richard for Kent and Walter for Oxford University.

Thornton died at Kensington in London in 1931 aged 75.

== Bibliography ==
- Carlaw, Derek (2020). Kent County Cricketers, A to Z: Part One (1806–1914) (PDF). Cardiff: ACS.
