= Ingleton Coalfield =

Coalfield in North Yorkshire, England

Coordinates: 54.144°N 2.477°W

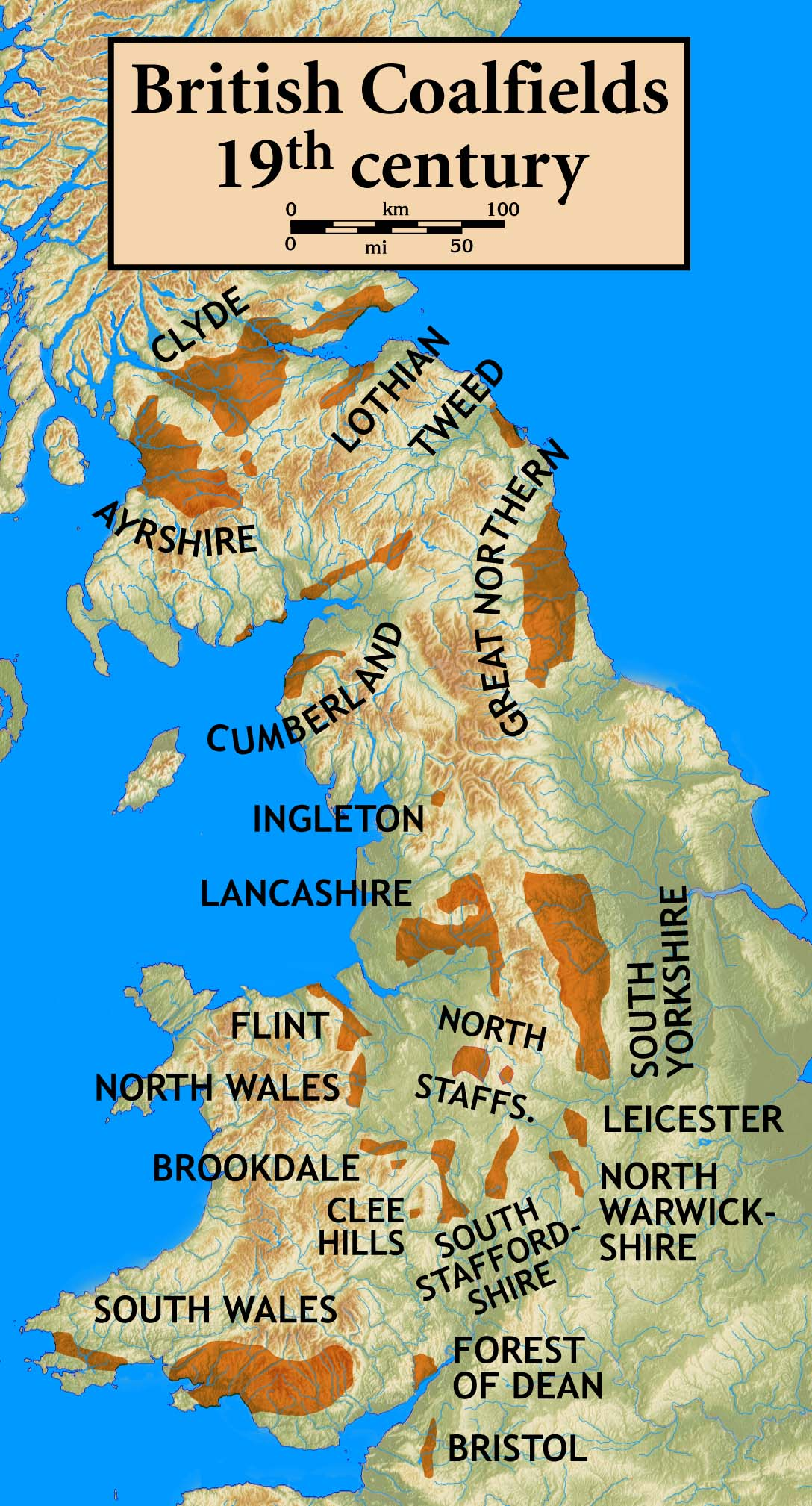
Map of British Coalfields

The Ingleton Coalfield is in North Yorkshire, close to its border with Lancashire in north-west England. Isolated from other coal-producing areas, it is one of the smallest coalfields in Great Britain.

Mining is known to have taken place here since the early 17th century though it was the middle of the 19th century before the coalfield was further developed.

== Geography and geology ==

Cross section of the Ingleton Coalfield

The Ingleton Coalfield is about six miles long by four miles wide lying mostly in the parish of Ingleton extending into the neighbouring parishes of Burton in Lonsdale and Thornton-in-Lonsdale. The coalfield terminates at the South Craven fault. The coal measures are shallow and represent the lowest layers in the Pennine coal measures sequence. The earliest coal mining occurred along the River Greta where Four Foot and Six Foot seams outcrop. Most deep mining was at New Ingleton Pit sunk in 1913. Its sinking led to the discovery of the Ten Foot seam (house and steam coal) at 127 yards, and the Nine Foot seam (steam and house coal) at 134 yards. Beneath them are the Four Foot seam (house, gas and coking coal) at 233 yards, the Three Foot or Yard seam (house and gas coal) at 236 yards and the Six Foot seam (steam and house coal) at 260 yards. Commercially viable deposits of fireclay lay under the Three Foot seam and pottery clay beneath the Six Foot seam used to make Ingleton Bricks.

== History ==
The first mention of coal extraction is in the will of Richard Lowther, Lord of the manor of Ingleton in 1645. The Lowthers who had interests in coal elsewhere took over the manor in 1605. In 1680 the colliery was leased to their relatives the Walkers. The lease was questioned by Henry Bouch who was lord of the manor in 1678, when pits were sunk at Bull Ing. There were other pits at Raygill and Faccon. In 1701, Dr Thomas Moore of Lancaster, married into the Walker family and became sole owner of Ingleton Colliery in 1711. It was managed by Cuthbert Kidd until 1730. The Foxcrofts took over the lease of the Burton and Ingleton Collieries.

Ownership passed to the Sergeantsons for four generations. George John Sergeantson found the collieries had been neglected in 1826 and employed Joseph Hunter as colliery manager. To improve the colliery he demolished the water-wheel at Parkfoot, installed the first steam engine at Ingleton and built a house at New Winning where he sank a new shaft for a pit that was worked from 1834 to 1857.

A new colliery was started at Wilson Wood to mine the Four Foot, Yard, and Six Foot seams. Its shaft was 180 feet deep, and the coal seams were inclined at 16 degrees. A steam engine pumped 560 gallons of water a minute from the shaft and 20,000 cubic feet of air circulated through the workings. On a 400-yard tramway, trains of seven tubs were pulled by ponies. There was a 100-yard inclined plane rising at an angle of 1 in 3. In October 1866 water from Wilson Brook flooded the mine which was abandoned. Workers moved to find work in Burnley and Barnsley and some were killed in the Oaks explosion of 12 December 1866. In 1872 four experienced miners sank two new shafts at Newfield and the colliery was bought by William Bracewell, a Lancashire mill-owner to supply his mills in Barnoldswick and Colne. He began draining the flooded Wilsons Wood pit and started brick production. He employed 120 men and coal was transported by horse and cart to the Midland Railway sidings from where half the coal went to his mills and the rest was used locally. After Bracewell's death the colliery suffered difficulties and was offered for sale by the trustees who had turned off the pumps at Wilsons Wood.

James Barker began working the pits on a small scale to supply the local market but was beset by litigation. Before his death from a heart attack on Ingleton Station in 1913, he had sold his interests in Ingleton Colliery to a syndicate, the New Ingleton Colliery Company. Two new shafts were sunk and the Ten Foot and Nine Foot seams were found. In 1926 the colliery employed 350 men.

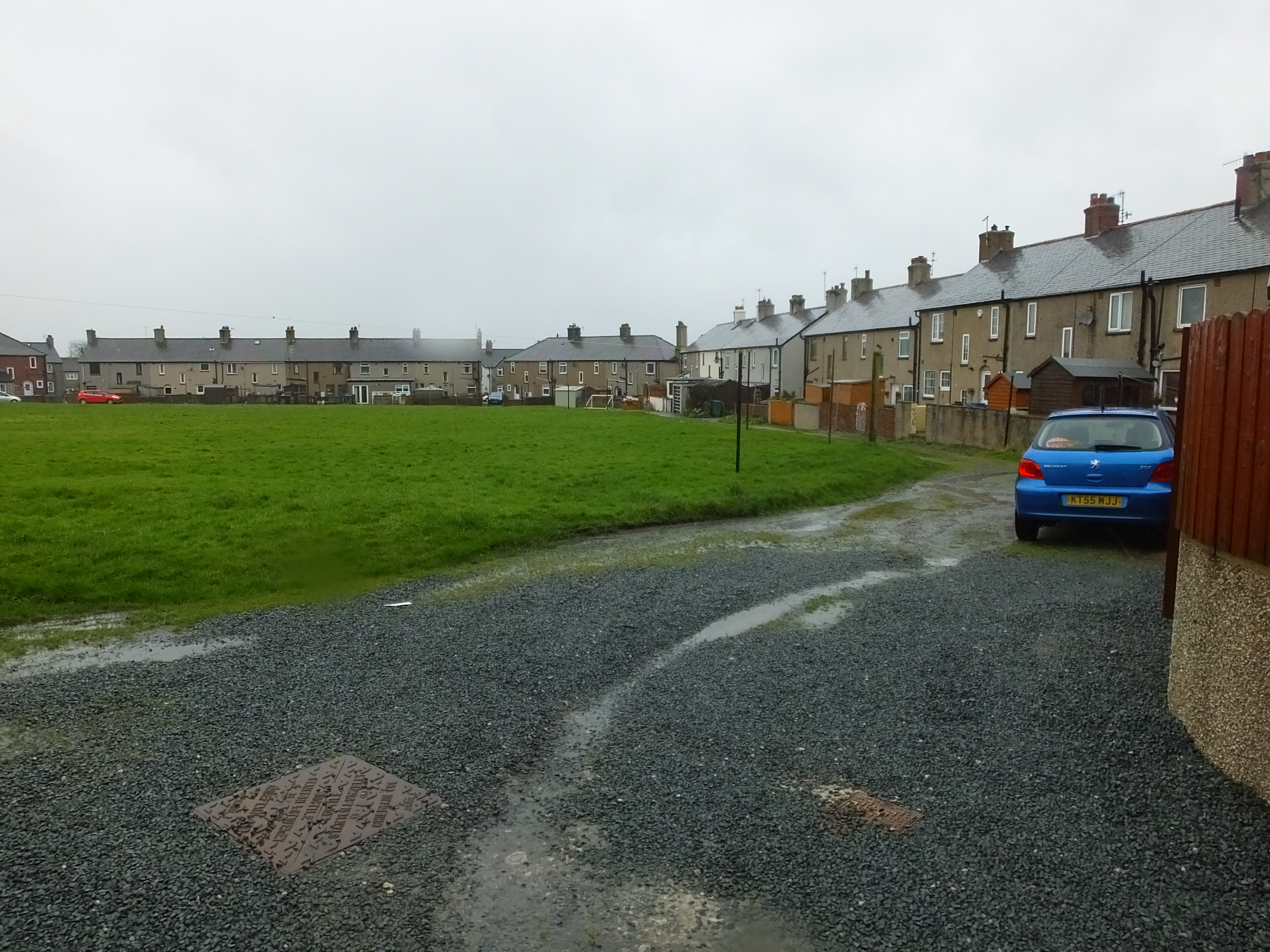
Miners' houses in the New Village

The New Village was constructed. Coal mining caused subsidence and the company was unable to meet the cost of compensation and the colliery closed in 1930.

== List of workings ==
Raygill SD678715 Raygill was first documented in 1736 although it may have been worked as early as the 15th century. Coal outcropped on Aspland Beck and the seams were worked from shallow pits. Coal from the working was pulled by donkeys over metal plates laid over the fields. Thomas Tatham bought the mining rights in 1835 and opened Low Raygill Colliery taking coal from the abandoned pillars. He dug a pit opposite the Wilson Wood Colliery to exploit the Six Foot seam in 1842 shortly before he was made bankrupt. The mining rights were bought by the Sergeantsons. Raygill was the original Ingleton Colliery.

Faccon SD666715 Faccon was a very early colliery in Bentham. Coal outcropped by the River Greta and could be worked in shallow pits on Ingleton and Bentham Moors. The pits were worked by turntrees. The workings were levelled and landscaped in 1836.

Bull Ing SD681716 Two shafts were sunk at Bull Ing in 1674 into outcrops of the Four Foot and Six Foot seams, they were hand pits. Bull Ing was known as Dr Moore's coalfield.

Gin Pit SD675720 The pit was located at Gin Meadow in Parkfoot. Name evidence and the first ordnance survey map suggests that the coal was raised using horse gins. For many years there was a large water wheel that drove pumps in a drainage shaft, and it was here that Joseph Hunter built the first steam engine for Sergeantson.

New Winning Pit SD691718 Stable End Pit was sunk in 1831 and hit the Four Foot seam at a depth of 80 yards. A 40 hp steam engine drove the pumps, and a 4 hp engine raised the coal. A second shaft was sunk next to new Winning House in 1834. It reached the Six Foot seam at a depth of 120 yards. The shaft was subsequently used as the upcast shaft by Wilson Wood Colliery. Haulage roads were driven from west to east along the strike of the coal which was worked up-dip by pillar and stall. In 1844 a drift was cut into the Four Foot seam. New Winning Pit was prone to flooding but firedamp was not a problem. New Winning employed about 100 men and boys. By 1853 it was decided to sink new shafts in Wilsons Wood.

Moorgarth Collieries SD699718 The coal at Moorgath was shallow, heavily faulted and troubled by water. It was close to the railway. It worked Yard Coal and the Four Foot seam from 1828 until 1880. Some reports of a Nine Foot seam suggest that the heavy faulting had breached into the seam or there was localised thickening of the Six Foot seam. The 1870 Newfield shafts attempted to mine the Four Foot seam and Bottom Coal (the Six Foot seam) but were not profitable.

Wilson Wood Colliery SD682721 The first shafts were sunk in 1854 just as the railway came to Ingleton. The shafts passed through the Four Foot seam and below it the Six Foot seam at 130 yards. The seam dipped to the north at a slope of 1 in 4. A 135m cross-measure drift was dug horizontally to connect with the Four Foot seam in 1858. Both seams were worked. Wilsons Wood was troubled by water ingress. A serious flood in December 1865 was followed by closure in October 1866. The only other employment in Ingleton was at the cotton mill which had burnt down two years earlier and reopened after the Cotton Famine in 1867. Men from Wilsons Wood sought work in Barnsley. After a change of ownership, extra steam engines were bought. One from Coates Old Mill in Barnoldswick. Pumping out took seven months and 58 million gallons of water was removed while 480 gallon per second continued to flow in. The mine was reopened.

Barkers Pits at Dolands SD693714 Two shafts were sunk at Dolands in 1854, and two further pits in 1867. After 1888 the coal lease was granted to Edward Danson and James Barker who were a partnership trading as "Ingleton Collieries", their first shaft was sunk 58 ft to the Four Foot seam, and coal was raised in July 1888. Two other shafts were dug- thought to be the "Nellie Pit" and the "Richard Pit". "Nellie Pit" was 6 ft in diameter and 22 yds deep, "Richard Pit" was 5 ft in diameter and 22 yards deep. These worked Cannel Coal and the Six Foot seam. The partnership dissolved in 1890, and Barker worked the colliery alone and union free until 1895 when he formed the partnership with William Haigh. This was only ever a small pit and it is speculated that he was exploiting collapsed pillars from worked out regions. He bought the clay concession from the Lord of the Manor and opened the brickworks at adjacent Great Milner, and a tramway connecting his interests to the LMS rail line at Moorgarth. After further litigation in 1903 he sold the coal lease. At various court appearances the history was retold with subtle difference in the dates and the facts.

Old Pit Working The coal lease of the Old Pit was bought in 1903 by "Ingleton Collieries Ltd" and the manager continued to be James Barker. Nellie Pit and Richard Pit were mined as the company changed its name to Inglenook and made test borings and acquired further coal rights. The rights passed to the New Ingleton Collieries Company which mined it as Old Pit. They sunk a new 22 yard deep 6 feet diameter shaft at Dolands to the Six Foot seam. In 1911 the company worked the Six Foot seam westward to a north–south fault. A cross-measures drift was dug northwards to intersect the Three Foot and Four Foot coals and between 1911 and 1914, 45 acres was worked. A Schiele fan for ventilation on Nellie Pit injected 5000 cubic feet of air a minute. In 1911 illumination was provided by naked lights. Old Pit closed in October 1914.

New Ingleton Colliery SD695723 A new pit was started in December 1909. The No 2 pit was sunk alongside the A65 road starting in summer 1912. Its 14 feet diameter shaft was 247 yards deep. Water was struck at 33 yards. Pumps working at 32,000 gallons an hour were needed to drain it, and the shaft walls were lined with segmented iron castings known as tubbing to prevent water ingress. At 124 yards and 131 yards the Ten Foot and the Nine Foot seams were discovered, the first time these seams has been found on the heavily faulted coalfield. Sinking continued and the predicted Four Foot and Yard seams were not found. The Six Foot seam was found at 247 yards and limited working started 26 September 1914. Sinking No 1 pit (the upcast shaft) started in July 1913 and terminated on reaching 156 yards at the Ten Foot seam in November 1914. It allowed coal to be recovered from the Ten Foot but left the Six Foot seam without a second point of egress which was a legal requirement. Miners wages at up to 16s 0d a day were above the industry minimum of 9s 9d. Miners were attracted to Ingleton from other coalfields and the New Village housing estate was built. Screens were built alongside the company's sidings. The Ten Foot seam was excellent steam and house coal but was small in area. It was worked by driving two headings east and west from the shaft along the strike. It dipped 1 in 5 towards the north. Barren ground was reached 100 yards to the east and 225 yards to the east: gates to the north went barren within 100 yards, and gates to the south within 250 yards. The rest of the seam had been washed out before the red rock measures were deposited. The coal was worked out in 1918. Cross measure drifts were cut to the Nine Foot seam but this was lower quality coal and difficult to work and it too was abandoned in 1918.

No 1 Pit was deepened to the Four Foot and the Yard seams at 233 and 236 yards. On reaching the Six Foot seam production recommenced producing 2200 tons a week. The northern boundary was limited by the Hollintree fault and altogether 45 acres of coal was recovered. The seam was worked until September 1921 when the colliery closed. It reopened in 1924 with new finance and working commenced on the Four Foot seam which was by far the largest, stretching from the Hollintree fault to an unnamed fault in the south. Coal was taken from 140 acres before it was depleted in 1934. Some success was had on the Yard Coal but the face collapsed in October 1935 and the colliery closed for good in 1936. Some men worked until 1940, salvaging equipment. The colliery was abandoned 16 August 1940.
