= Thornton in Lonsdale =

Village and civil parish in North Yorkshire, England

Coordinates: 54.22322°N 2.43638°W

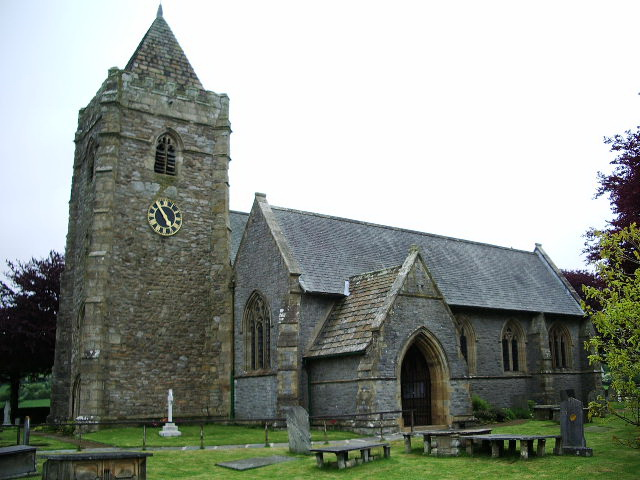
- St Oswald's Church

- Location within North Yorkshire
- Population: 288 (2011 census)
- OS grid reference: SD716809
- Civil parish: Thornton in Lonsdale
- Unitary authority: North Yorkshire
- Ceremonial county: North Yorkshire
- Region: Yorkshire and the Humber
- Country: England
- Sovereign state: United Kingdom
- Post town: CARNFORTH
- Postcode district: LA6
- Dialling code: 01524
- Police: North Yorkshire
- Fire: North Yorkshire
- Ambulance: Yorkshire
- UK Parliament: Skipton and Ripon

Thornton in Lonsdale is a village and civil parish in the county of North Yorkshire in England. The village is very close to the boundaries with Cumbria and Lancashire and is about 0.6 miles (1 km) north-west of Ingleton and 6 miles (9 km) south-east of Kirkby Lonsdale. It had a population of 308 in the 2001 census, falling to 288 at the 2011 census. Its main claims to fame are the Marton Arms Hotel and St Oswald's Church: Sir Arthur Conan Doyle married his first wife at this church in 1885 and held his reception at The Marton Arms before setting off to Ireland on honeymoon. Doyle's mother resided at nearby Masongill from 1882 to 1917.

== History ==
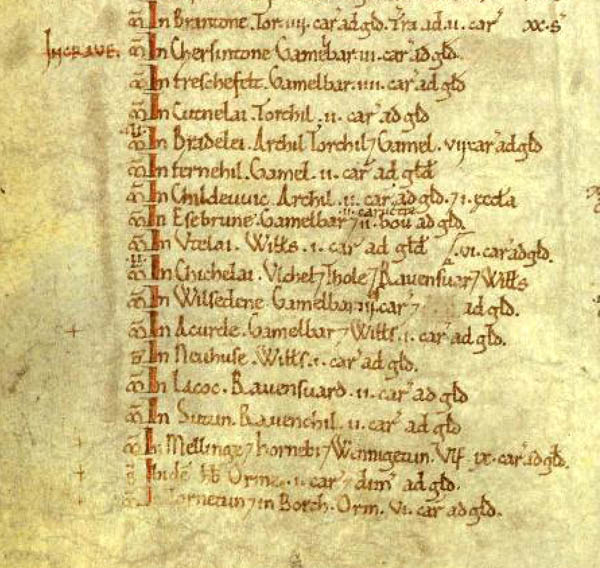
The Domesday Book folio 301v includes the arable land in Thornton in Lonsdale

In 1086 the Domesday Book listed on folio 301v under Craven Torntun & in Borch, Orm vi curactes ad geld. – that is in Thornton in Lonsdale with Burrow-with-Burrow Orm has circa 720 acres of plough-land to be taxed. This manor belonged to Orm, one of the family of Norse noblemen who held the most land in Northern England. All estates would also include grazing land, but since only arable land was tallied their total area can only be inferred.

=== Historical parish ===
Because the parish of Thornton in Lonsdale was in the Lonsdale Hundred, a region more ancient than the county of Lancashire, it lay across two counties. A strip of land down the west side of the parish including Ireby was in Lancashire. The Lancashire area was about 3.7 miles (6 km) long and its width tapered from about 1.2 miles (2 km) to about 330 feet (100 m). However the majority of the parish, including Thornton and Burton in Lonsdale, was in the West Riding of Yorkshire. From 1974 to 2023 it was part of the Craven District. It is now administered by the unitary North Yorkshire Council.

== See also ==
- Listed buildings in Thornton in Lonsdale
