= Walter Thornton (cricketer) =

English cricketer (1858–1915)

Personal information
- Full name: Walter Alfred Thornton
- Born: 23 February 1858; Kensington, Middlesex, England
- Died: 2 February 1915 (aged 56); Blakedown, Worcestershire, England
- Batting: Right-handed
- Bowling: Right-arm fast
- Relatives: Richard Thornton (grandfather); Richard Lee (father); Rev. Richard Thornton (brother); Albert Thornton (brother)

Domestic team information
- Years: Team
- 1879–1882: Oxford University

Career statistics
Competition	First-class
Matches	24
Runs scored	843
Batting average	18.73
100s/50s	0/4
Top score	70
Balls bowled	1,280
Wickets	27
Bowling average	20.77
5 wickets in innings	0
10 wickets in match	0
Best bowling	4/29
Catches/stumpings	9/–
- Source: Cricinfo, 16 September 2018

Walter Alfred Thornton (23 February 1858 – 2 February 1915), born Walter Alfred Lee, (Note: Thornton's father was born Richard Lee and was the illegitimate son of Richard Thornton, one of the richest men of the 19th century. Lee changed his surname to Thornton in 1865 as a condition of his father's will. Alumni Oxoniensis gives the birth name of Thornton and one of his brothers as Lee.) was an English cricketer active in first-class cricket from 1879 to 1883.

Born to Margaret James and Richard Napoleon Lee at Kensington, Middlesex, Thornton was the third of three brothers. Both his brothers, Richard and Albert played first-class cricket for Kent County Cricket Club. He was educated at Winchester College, where he played for the college cricket team between 1874 and 1876, captaining the team in his final year at school. From Winchester he went up to St John's College, Oxford, where he made his debut in first-class cricket for Oxford University Cricket Club against the Gentlemen of England at the Magdalen Ground in 1879.

Thornton played first-class cricket for the university until 1882, making 22 appearances. He won an Oxford Blue for both cricket and billiards. He made one first-class appearance each for the Marylebone Cricket Club and the Orleans Club in 1883. Across 24 first-class matches, Thornton scored 843 runs with four half centuries and took 27 wickets, with best figures of 4/29. He was made a lieutenant in the Devonshire Regiment in 1883. He died at Blakedown, near Kidderminster, Worcestershire on 2 February 1915. His grandfather was the millionaire Richard Thornton.
