= Marton Arms Hotel =

Pub in Thornton in Lonsdale, North Yorkshire, England

Coordinates: 54°09′27″N 2°29′01″W

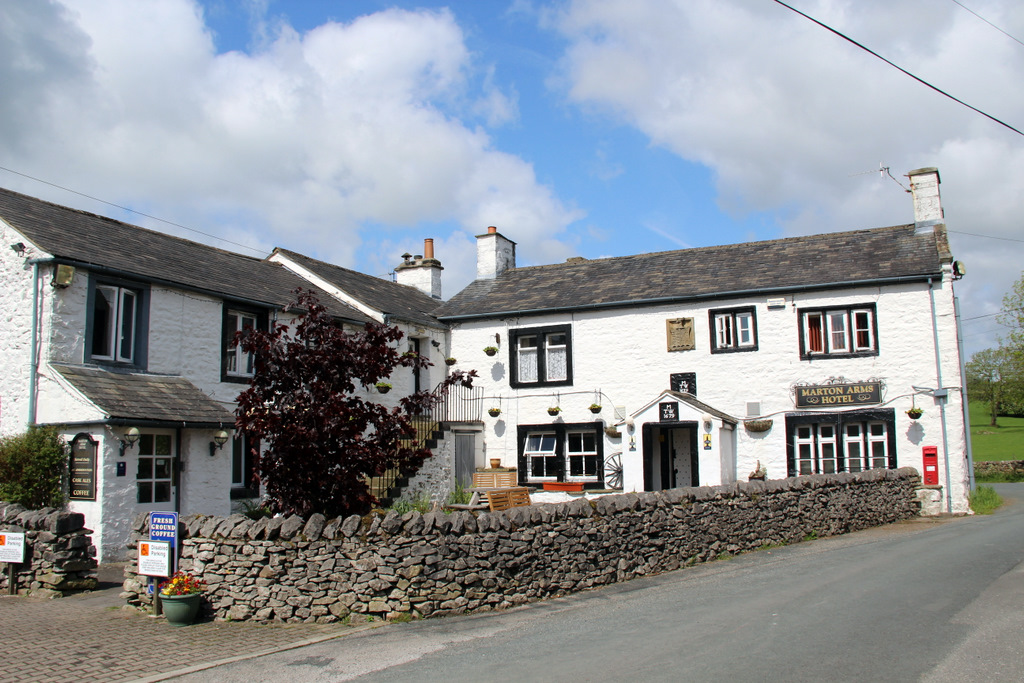
The building, in 2011

The Marton Arms Hotel is a historic pub in Thornton in Lonsdale, a village in North Yorkshire, in England.

The inn was built in 1679 and was altered in the 19th and 20th centuries. The Craven Herald describes it as "one of the most well-known pubs in the Yorkshire Dales". The building was grade II listed in 1958. In addition to a bar, it offers dining including a function suite, and several bedrooms.

The building is constructed of limewashed stone, with painted stone dressings and a stone slate roof. It has two storeys and three bays. In the centre is a gabled porch with a moulded surround and a decorated lintel with an initialled datestone, over which is a heraldic panel. The windows are mullioned, some with sashes and the others with casements.

== See also ==
- Listed buildings in Thornton in Lonsdale
