= Listed buildings in Burton in Lonsdale =

Burton in Lonsdale is a civil parish in the county of North Yorkshire, England. It contains 37 listed buildings that are recorded in the National Heritage List for England. Of these, one is listed at Grade II*, the middle of the three grades, and the others are at Grade II, the lowest grade. The parish contains the village of Burton in Lonsdale and the surrounding countryside. Most of the listed buildings are houses, cottages and associated structures, farmhouses and farm buildings. The others include a bridge, a public house, boundary stone a school and a church.

== Key ==
Grade	Criteria
II*	Particularly important buildings of more than special interest
II	Buildings of national importance and special interest

== Buildings ==
Name and location	Photograph	Date	Notes	Grade
Donkin House; 54.14352°N 2.53503°W	—	17th century	The house is pebbledashed and has a slate roof, two storeys and three bays. The doorway has a moulded surround and a basket-arched head, and to its right is a narrow fixed light with a chamfered surround. The other windows on the front are sashes with rendered surrounds, and in the right return is a double-chamfered two-light casement window.	II
Thornton Cottage; 54.14454°N 2.53823°W	—	Mid 17th century	The cottage is in stone with painted stone dressings, quoins on the right and a tile roof. There are two storeys and two bays. The doorway on the left has a plain surround, and the windows have two lights and mullions.	II
Bull Farmhouse; 54.14457°N 2.53517°W	—	1669	An inn, later a farmhouse, that was refronted in the early 18th century. It is in stone with a slate roof, two storeys and two bays. The doorway has a plain surround and a decorated lintel. The windows have moulded surrounds, and contain sashes in the ground floor and casements in the upper floor. At the rear is a doorway with a chamfered surround and a decorated dated lintel.	II
Lowfields Farmhouse; 54.14932°N 2.51217°W	—	1700	The farmhouse, which was later extended, is in stone and has a stone slate roof. There are two storeys, originally three bays, with a later extension to the left and a barn to the right. The doorway has a moulded surround, and a decorated wreathed and dated lintel. The windows are casements with a continuous hood mould over the ground floor windows, rising over the lintel.	II
The Cross and Manor House; 54.14449°N 2.53544°W		c. 1700	The former manor house, later altered and divided into two houses, is in stone with a slate roof. The Cross, on the left, has two storeys and attics, and three bays. In the middle bay is a doorway with a moulded surround and a fanlight. The lower two floors have casement windows with moulded surrounds, and in the attic are two three-light chamfered mullioned windows. The Manor House has quoins, three storeys and two bays. In the left bay is the original main entrance that has a Gibbs surround, a cornice, and a round-headed broken pediment containing an illegible date. Above it is a tall narrow blind window, the top window in the right bay has two lights and a mullion, and all the windows have moulded surrounds.	II
Low Threaber Farmhouse; 54.15207°N 2.52448°W	—	1713	The farmhouse is in stone, with painted stone dressings, and a stone slate roof with coping and a kneeler on the left. There are two storeys and three bays, and a later rear wing. The central doorway has moulded jambs on square bases, and a moulded lintel with a pulvinated frieze, a cornice and the date. The windows are sashes with moulded surrounds.	II
Hollins House; 54.14439°N 2.53201°W	—	1720	A stone house with painted stone dressings, paired eaves modillions, and a stone slate roof. There are two storeys and two bays. The central doorway has a chamfered surround and a dated lintel. The windows have plain surrounds and contain bowed casements. To the right is a blocked window in each floor.	II
Orchard Cottage; 54.14416°N 2.53278°W	—	1723	The cottage is in stone, with painted stone dressings, a slate roof, two storeys and two bays. The central doorway has a plain surround, and a lintel containing a moulded panel with initials and the date. The windows are casements with plain surrounds.	II
The Manor; 54.14466°N 2.53491°W	—	Early to mid 18th century	A farmhouse, later a private house, it is in stone with a slate roof. There are two storeys and three bays, the middle bay projecting as a two-storey porch. This contains a doorway approached by five semicircular steps that has a chamfered surround, and to its right is a fixed-light window. The other windows have moulded surrounds, two lights with mullions, and contain casements.	II
Lowfields Cottage and barn 54.14553°N 2.55318°W	—	1739	The cottage and barn are in stone with stone slate roofs and a shaped kneeler on the left. The cottage has two storeys and two bays. To the left is a blocked entrance, to its right is a five-light mullioned window. In the upper floor are two two-light mullioned windows, between which is a datestone with a scrolled shield and initials. At the rear is a shared entrance. To the left is a two-bay barn containing a wagon entrance with a segmental head and a keystone, above which is a pitching hole with keystones, and a square window.	II
Whaitber Farmhouse; 54.15852°N 2.52897°W	—	c. 1740	The farmhouse is in stone with painted stone dressings and a stone slate roof. There are two storeys and three bays. The flat-roofed porch has an entrance with a segmental head, impost blocks, and a moulded keystone. The windows are a mix of sashes, casements and fixed lights. At the rear is a gatepost cap with initials and a date.	II
Burton Bridge; 54.14240°N 2.53261°W		18th century (probable)	The bridge, which was repaired in 1833, carries Burton Hill over the River Greta. It is in stone and consists of three segmental arches. The bridge has round cutwaters with conical caps, a string course, and coped parapets and wings.	II
Hill House; 54.14410°N 2.53617°W	—	18th century	A house, later extended, and subsequently divided, it is stuccoed, with painted stone dressings, quoins, a moulded eaves cornice, a stone slate roof, and two storeys. The right-hand part has three bays, a doorway with a plain surround and a lintel with an imitation keystone. The extension on the left has a doorway with a moulded surround and a rectangular fanlight with diamond glazing. The windows in both parts are sashes with plain surrounds.	II
Punch Bowl Hotel; 54.14388°N 2.53314°W		18th century	The public house, which was extended to the left in the 19th century, is in limewashed stone, with painted stone dressings, a slate roof, and two storeys. The original part has three bays, a central doorway with a moulded hood, and mullioned windows containing casements and fixed lights. In the extension are a doorway and two windows.	II
Town End Cottage; 54.14518°N 2.53242°W	—	Mid 18th century	The cottage is in stone with a stone slate roof, two storeys and two bays. The central doorway has a plain surround. The windows in the ground floor have three lights, those in the upper floor have two lights, all are mullioned, and they contain a mix of sashes and fixed lights.	II
Tranquil Vale; 54.14454°N 2.53836°W	—	Mid 18th century	A stone cottage with quoins and a tile roof. There are two storeys and three bays. The central doorway has a plain surround and a moulded lintel. Above the doorway is a single-light window, and the other windows have three lights and mullions, and contain casements.	II
Barn, Castle Hill Farm; 54.14464°N 2.53732°W	—	Mid to late 18th century	The barn is in stone, with chamfered quoins, modillion eaves and a hipped slate roof. There are two storeys and a U-shaped plan, consisting of a range of three bays, and projecting gabled wings. In the centre is a wagon entrance with a segmental head and a chamfered surround, above which is a blocked oeil-de-boeuf with four keystones. Each wing contains a round-headed coach entrance with impost blocks and a keystone, one blocked with a window inserted, a stable entrance with a similar surround, sash windows and loft windows. In the gable ends facing the road are blocked round pitching holes with four keystones.	II
Hillcross House; 54.14480°N 2.53370°W	—	Mid to late 18th century	A stone house with painted dressings, quoins, a string course, a modillion eaves cornice, and a slate roof with gable coping. There are two storeys and three bays, the middle bay projecting and containing a porch with a moulded surround, and a broken pediment on consoles, surmounted by a tall concave-sided pedestal. The windows are sashes with plain surrounds.	II
Fell House; 54.14462°N 2.53419°W	—	Late 18th century	A vicarage, later a private house, it is pebbledashed, and has stone dressings, shaped eaves modillions and a slate roof. There are two storeys and three bays. The central doorway and the windows, which are sashes, have plain surrounds.	II
Whaitber East Farmhouse; 54.15857°N 2.52874°W	—	Late 18th century	The farmhouse is pebbledashed, on a plinth, with quoins, shaped modillions, and a slate roof with coped gables and kneelers. There are two storeys and four bays. On the front is a gabled Tuscan porch with two columns, two engaged pilasters, a round-headed entrance, a fanlight, and an open pediment. The windows are sashes with plain surrounds.	II
Boundary stone 54.15746°N 2.53434°W		c. 1800	The boundary stone is a sandstone, and consists of an upright flag with the upper corners splayed. It is divided by a vertical line, the left side is inscribed "IREBY" and on the right side is "BURTON IN LONSDALE".	II
Garden wall and shelter, Lowfields Park; 54.14556°N 2.55444°W	—	c. 1800	The garden to the west of the house is enclosed on the west, north and east sides by a stone wall with coping. At the southwest corner is a round-headed garden shelter with a plain surround, a square base, impost blocks and a keystone, above which is an inscribed and dated plaque. The entrance at the southeast has a round head, a plain surround, a square base, impost blocks and a keystone.	II
Bleabury House; 54.14420°N 2.53196°W	—	Late 18th to early 19th century	The house is rendered, and has stone dressings, a slate roof, two storeys and two bays. The openings have plain surrounds, the doorway has a rectangular fanlight and a moulded hood, and the windows are sashes.	II
Frount's Cottage; 54.14428°N 2.53198°W	—	Late 18th to early 19th century	The cottage is in stone with a slate roof, two storeys and two bays. The central doorway and the windows, which are sashes, have plain surrounds, and to the left is a rear access door.	II
Lowfields Park; 54.14551°N 2.55335°W		Late 18th to early 19th century	A house in painted stone, with quoins, a string course, a cornice, and a slate roof with coped gables and shaped kneelers. There are two storeys and three bays, and a later projecting bay and a conservatory added later on the left. In the centre is a later porch with a round-headed entrance, a Gibbs surround, a traceried fanlight, a keystone, a round-headed hood on scrolled consoles, and a dentilled cornice. The original doorway has Tuscan pilasters, a cornice and a pediment. The ground floor projects and has a dentilled cornice and mullioned and transomed windows. In the upper floor are sash windows, and at the rear is a round-headed staircase window with impost blocks and a keystone. On the roof is a cupola with a lead roof and a weathervane.	II
Tatham House; 54.14409°N 2.53211°W	—	Late 18th to early 19th century	The house is in stone with chamfered quoins and a stone slate roof. There are two storeys and two bays. The doorway has a plain surround on square bases, and a moulded pediment. The windows are sashes with plain surrounds.	II
1 and 2 Constable Cottages; 54.14502°N 2.53372°W	—	1824	A stable, later two cottages, pebbledashed, with painted stone dressings and a tile roof. There are two storeys and two bays. In the centre are paired doorways, the windows are casements, and all have plain surrounds. In the upper floor is a dated and initialled panel.	II
3 and 4 Duke Street; 54.14452°N 2.53203°W	—	Early 19th century (probable)	A pair of stone cottages with a slate roof, two storeys and three bays. The doorways have plain surrounds, the left cottage has two bowed casement windows in each floor, and the right cottage has one sash window in each floor.	II
Church View; 54.14453°N 2.53531°W	—	Early 19th century	Stables, later a cottage, in stone with a slate roof, two storeys and two bays. The central doorway and the windows, which are sashes, have plain surrounds. To the left of the doorway is a segmental-headed former carriage entrance with a keystone.	II
Fern Lea; 54.14497°N 2.53382°W		c. 1830s	A police house, later a private house, it is in stone, with chamfered quoins and a stone slate roof. There are two storeys and two bays. The central doorway, which has a rectangular fanlight, and the windows, which are sashes, have plain surrounds.	II
Mount Wellington Cottage and Old Corn Mill; 54.14749°N 2.52923°W		c. 1830s	A mill that was later altered and converted into a farmhouse, it is in stone, with quoins, shaped eaves modillions and a slate roof. There are two storeys and four bays. The left two bays are older and wider, and in the upper floor are two tall round-arched windows with imitation keystones and marginal glazing. Elsewhere, there are a doorway and square windows; all the openings have plain surrounds. The two right bays contain sash windows, and in the right bay is a projecting porch.	II
Boundary stone about 550 metres south-west of Westhouse Lodge; 54.15435°N 2.51522°W	—	Early to mid-19th century (probable)	The boundary stone is in millstone grit, about 1 metre (3 ft 3 in) in height and 1 metre (3 ft 3 in) in length. It has a V-shaped vertical grove, inscribed on the left is "THORNTON IN LONSDALE"and on the right "BURTON IN LONSDALE".	II
Harris Garth, Stone Bower, garden wall and gateposts 54.14426°N 2.53536°W	—	1837	A house, later divided into two, in stone, with chamfered quoins, a sill band, paired eaves modillions, slate roofs, and two storeys. Harris Garth has three bays, a central porch with two Tuscan columns, two engaged pilasters, an entablature and a moulded cornice, and a doorway with a rectangular fanlight, and the windows are sashes. Stone Bower, at right angles, and two bays, a doorway and windows with plain surrounds, and an inscribed datestone. The garden walls are in stone with chamfered coping, and the two gate piers have vermiculated bases, moulded panels, and ball finials.	II
Rosedale, North Cottage and North House; 54.14510°N 2.53330°W	—	1837	A row of three cottages in stone with quoins with a stone slate roof. There are two storeys and five bays. In the middle bay is a carriage entrance with plain jambs, chamfered voussoirs and a dated keystone. The doorways and the windows, which are sashes, have plain surrounds.	II
Lowfields Lodge; 54.14623°N 2.55015°W	—	1850	The lodge is in stone with a stone slate roof. There are two storeys, a T-shaped plan, three bays, the left bay projecting and gabled, and a continuous rear outshut. In front of the right two bays is a timber verandah with a stone slate roof, the doorway is in the middle bay, and most of the window are mullioned and contain casements. In the left bay is a bay window with a hipped slate roof, and the window in the upper floor of the right bay is a half-dormer.	II
Thornton's School; 54.14527°N 2.54017°W		1853	The school is in stone with a slate roof and the gable ends facing the road. The central block, which formed the master's and mistresses' houses, has two storeys and two bays, and is flanked by single-storey wings that formed the classrooms for boys and girls respectively. Each house has a projecting porch containing an entrance with a moulded surround, a Tudor arched head, and a moulded stepped parapet. In the upper floor is an inscribed panel, and in the centre is a round-headed niche with a moulded surround containing a bust of the founder. On the gable is a corbelled sexagonal finial. The wings contain lancet windows, inscribed panels, and a gargoyle, and have a fleur-de-lis finial. The garden walls and gate piers are in stone and are coped.	II
All Saints Church, wall, railings and gates 54.14392°N 2.53562°W		1868–70	The church was designed by Paley and Austin in Early English style. It is built in sandstone, with a slate roof, and the wooden porch has a tile roof. The church consists of a nave, a north aisle, a north porch, a chancel, a north vestry, and a south steeple. The steeple has a tower with three stages, buttresses, lancet windows, lancet bell openings, a corbel table and a broach spire. To the north and east of the church are low walls with iron railings, a double gate in the north wall, and a single gate in the east wall.	II*
