= Ireby, Lancashire =

Hamlet and civil parish in Lancashire, England

Coordinates: 54.173°N 2.529°W

Ireby
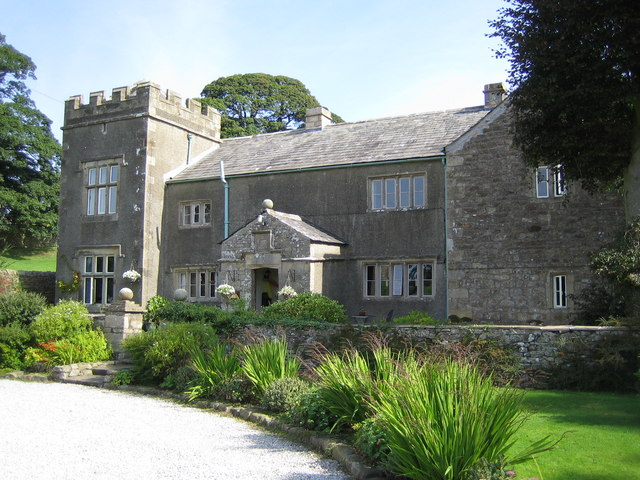
- Over Hall

- Location in the City of Lancaster district Location within Lancashire
- Population: 78 (2001)
- OS grid reference: SD654754
- Civil parish: Ireby
- District: Lancaster
- Shire county: Lancashire
- Region: North West
- Country: England
- Sovereign state: United Kingdom
- Post town: CARNFORTH
- Postcode district: LA6
- Dialling code: 015242
- Police: Lancashire
- Fire: Lancashire
- Ambulance: North West
- UK Parliament: Morecambe and Lunesdale

Ireby is a small hamlet and civil parish on the edge of Lancashire, England, bordering North Yorkshire. It lies in the City of Lancaster, just inside the recently extended boundaries of the Yorkshire Dales, near the community of Masongill. The parish had a population of 78 according to the 2001 Census. In the 2011 census the parish was grouped with Leck. The name means "Town of the Irish Vikings".

== Parish and county ==
Ireby, Lancashire, was formerly included in the parish of Thornton in Lonsdale despite Thornton being in Yorkshire. It was because this area was in the Lonsdale Hundred that the founders of the county of Lancashire claimed the left side of that parish including Ireby. This piece of Lancashire is c6km long and in width tapers from c2km to only about 100m.

== See also ==
- Listed buildings in Ireby, Lancashire
