= Listed buildings in Thornton in Lonsdale =

Thornton in Lonsdale is a civil parish in the county of North Yorkshire, England. It contains 21 listed buildings that are recorded in the National Heritage List for England. Of these, one is at Grade II*, the middle of the three grades, and the others are at Grade II, the lowest grade. The parish contains the village of Thornton in Lonsdale and hamlets including Masongill, and the surrounding countryside. The listed buildings include houses, cottages and associated structures, farmhouses, a church, a public house, a set of stocks, two boundary stones, a hen house, a milestone and a war memorial.

== Key ==
Grade	Criteria
II*	Particularly important buildings of more than special interest
II	Buildings of national importance and special interest

== Buildings ==
Name and location	Photograph	Date	Notes	Grade
St Oswald's Church; 54.15747°N 2.48277°W		15th century	The oldest part of the church is the tower, with the rest rebuilt in 1869–70 by Paley and Austin following a fire. It is built in limestone with sandstone dressings and a Westmorland slate roof, and consists of a nave, north and south aisles, a south porch, north and south chapels, a chancel and a west tower. The tower has four stages, diagonal buttresses, a west doorway with a pointed arch and a hood mould, above which is a three-light mullioned window and a small ogee-headed window. The bell openings have two lights and a continuous hood mould, and above is an embattled parapet, and a slate pyramidal spire with a lead finial.	II*
Glebe House; 54.16321°N 2.47816°W		Mid-17th century	The farmhouse is in limewashed stone with a slate roof. There are two storeys and three bays. The doorway has a slate hood, the ground floor windows are casements, and the upper floor windows, originally mullioned with the mullions now missing, consist of a fixed light window and two sashes. On the left gable end is a massive projecting chimney stack.	II
Westhouse Lodge Cottage; 54.15796°N 2.50963°W	—	17th century	The cottage dates mainly from the 19th century. It is in stone. with chamfered quoins, eaves modillions, and a stone slate roof with a kneeler. There are two storeys, two bays, and a bay attached to the adjoining house. The doorway has a moulded surround, and a decorated initialled and dated lintel. Some windows are casements and others have fixed lights.	II
Dale House; 54.17189°N 2.51626°W	—	Mid to late 17th century	The house is in stone, it has a later asbestos slate roof, and a former barn to the west has been incorporated into the house. There are two storeys and three bays. On the front is a doorway, and most of the windows are mullioned, some with sashes and some with casements.	II
Halsteads; 54.15453°N 2.48445°W	—	c. 1670	A farmhouse, later extended into a private house, it is in stone with a stone slate roof. There are two storeys and an L-shaped plan, with a front range of seven bays, the right two bays taller and projecting. On the front is a Doric porch with columns, an entablature and a pediment, and a doorway with engaged pilasters. The windows on the front are mullioned with two round-arched lights and hood moulds.	II
Thornton Hall; 54.16291°N 2.47594°W		Late 17th century	The farmhouse is in limewashed stone with a stone slate roof. There are two storeys and three bays. On the front is a gabled porch with a moulded entrance surround. The windows to its left are sashes, the window on the upper floor of the right bay is mullioned and stepped with three lights, and the remaining windows have lost their mullions.	II
Marton Arms Inn; 54.15744°N 2.48342°W		1679	The public house is in limewashed stone, with painted stone dressings and a stone slate roof. There are two storeys and three bays. In the centre is a gabled porch with a moulded surround and a decorated lintel with an initialled datestone, over which is a heraldic panel. The windows are mullioned, some with sashes and the others with casements.	II
Masongill Lodge; 54.17261°N 2.51526°W	—	1709	The house is in stone with painted dressings and a stone slate roof. There are two storeys and three bays. On the front is a gabled porch, with a moulded entrance surround, and a decorated dated and initialled lintel. The windows are mullioned.	II
Trees House; 54.15905°N 2.50320°W	—	1725	A farmhouse, later a private house, it is rendered, and has painted stone dressings, shaped eaves modillions, and a stone slate roof. There are two storeys and three bays. The central doorway has a moulded eared architrave and a moulded cornice. Above it is an initialled and dated panel, with a shield and acanthus decoration. The window above the doorway is a sash with a single light, and the other windows are mullioned with two lights.	II
Former cottage and lean-to, Halsteads; 54.15455°N 2.48485°W	—	Early 18th century	The cottage, later used for other purposes, is in stone with a stone slate roof. There are two storeys and two bays, and a rear lean-to. The central entrance has a moulded surround and a stable door, and the windows are mullioned. The lean-to incorporates a re-set 17th-century doorway with a moulded surround and a decorated inscribed lintel.	II
Stocks; 54.15768°N 2.48305°W		Early 18th century	The stocks adjacent to the churchyard wall consist of two millstone grit posts about 1.1 metres (3 ft 7 in) in height with a mortice on the inner faces for the top rail. The base rail has four notches.	II
Westhouse Lodge; 54.15797°N 2.50981°W	—	c. 1730	The farmhouse is in pebbledashed stone with stone dressings, paired eaves modillions, and a stone slate roof. There are two storeys and three bays. The central doorway has a moulded surround and a segmental-arched lintel, above which is a datestone. The windows are mullioned and contain sashes.	II
Lowfields; 54.16076°N 2.51790°W	—	1763	The farmhouse is in stone with painted stone dressings and a stone slate roof. There are two storeys and two bays. The central doorway has engaged pilasters, and a basket-arched lintel with a keystone. Above it is a datestone on brackets with Doric pilasters and a cornice. The windows are mullioned with moulded surrounds containing casements.	II
Bridge to northeast of Broadwood Cottage; 54.15424°N 2.47092°W		Late 18th century	The bridge carries a road over the River Twiss. It is in stone, and consists of a segmental arch over the river, and a small arch over the land on the west side. It has four pilasters with caps, and a string course at the base of the parapet.	II
Masongill House; 54.17322°N 2.51356°W		c. 1780	The house is rendered, and has chamfered quoins, a moulded modillion eaves cornice, and a stone slate roof with kneelers and ball finials. The central block has two storeys and an attic, and three bays. In the centre is a trellised porch, and a doorway with a plain surround and a blocked fanlight. Above it is a single-light window, the outer bays contain mullioned windows, and in the centre is a gabled dormer with a round-headed window, an open pediment on scrolled brackets, and a ball finial. The central block is flanked by protruding single-storey pavilions, each with pilasters and an open pediment. On the left return is a canted bay window.	II
Boundary stone on bridge to east of Broadwood Cottage; 54.15432°N 2.47127°W		Early 19th century	The boundary stone consists of a rectangular slab of Horton slate. It is inscribed "Thornton B" and "Wapentake of St".	II
Kitchen garden wall, Halsteads; 54.15479°N 2.48537°W	—	Early 19th century (probable)	The kitchen garden to the northwest of the house is enclosed by a stone wall with millstone grit coping, between 2 metres (6 ft 7 in) and 3 metres (9.8 ft) in height. On the east side is a round-arched opening with imposts and a keystone.	II
Hen House; 54.15781°N 2.48320°W		Early 19th century	The hen house is in stone with millstone grit dressings and a Westmorland slate roof. On the north face are three projecting slabs with the entrance above the top slab, which is about 30 centimetres (12 in) square.	II
Boundary stone about 550 metres south-west of Westhouse Lodge; 54.15435°N 2.51522°W	—	Early to mid-19th century (probable)	The boundary stone is in millstone grit, about 1 metre (3 ft 3 in) in height and 1 metre (3 ft 3 in) in length. It has a V-shaped vertical grove, inscribed on the left is "THORNTON IN LONSDALE"and on the right "BURTON IN LONSDALE".	II
Milestone; 54.15476°N 2.48134°W		Late 19th century	The milestone is in millstone grit with a cast iron plate. It has a triangular plan and a rounded top. Inscribed on the top is "LANCASTER & RICHMOND ROAD" and "THORNTON IN LONSDALE", on the left side is the distance to Lancaster, and on the right side the distances to Ingleton, Hawes and Richmond.	II
War memorial 54.15757°N 2.48327°W		c. 1922	The war memorial is in an enclosure at the corner of the churchyard with a wall and railings. It is in stone, and consists of a Maltese cross with a carved circular detail at its centre. It has a tapering shaft on a rectangular plinth, on a base of three steps. On the plinth are inscriptions and the names of those lost in the two World Wars, and there is another inscription on the top step of the base.	II
