= Listed buildings in Ireby, Lancashire =

Ireby is a civil parish in Lancaster, Lancashire, England. It contains five listed buildings that are recorded in the National Heritage List for England. Of these, two are listed at Grade II*, the middle grade, and the others are at Grade II, the lowest grade. The parish contains the small settlement of Ireby, and is otherwise rural. The most important building in the parish is Over Hall; this and its stables are listed. The other listed buildings consist of a house, a farmhouse, and a clapper bridge.

== Key ==
Grade	Criteria
II*	Particularly important buildings of more than special interest
II	Buildings of national importance and special interest

== Buildings ==
Name and location	Photograph	Date	Notes	Grade
Bainbridge House; 54.17481°N 2.53059°W	—	Early 17th century (possible)	A sandstone house with a slate roof in two storeys. The original part has two bays with windows that have lost their mullions. The later extension to the right contains a mullioned window, a sash window, and other windows that have been blocked.	II
Ireby Hall Farmhouse; 54.16929°N 2.54189°W	—	Early 17th century (probable)	The house is in sandstone with a slate roof, and has two storeys. The main part has three bays and modern windows. In the centre is a modern porch with a Tudor arched head. Above the window to the left is a re-set battlemented lintel inscribed 1641. To the left are two later bays with sash windows.	II
Over Hall; 54.17698°N 2.52436°W		1687	A country house that was extended and altered in the 19th century. It is in pebbledashed stone with a slate roof, and has two storeys. The entrance front has a main block of two bays, a cross-wing to the right, and a 19th-century tower to the left. In the centre is a single-storey gabled porch with a Tudor arched doorway above which is an inscribed plaque. The windows in the main part of the house are mullioned; those in the tower also have transoms. The tower has an embattled parapet and a pyramidal roof.	II*
Stables, Over Hall; 54.17692°N 2.52505°W	—	1690	The stables are in sandstone with a stone-slate roof, and have two storeys and seven bays. In the centre is a doorway with a re-set plaque above. To the right of the doorway are windows with moulded surrounds, those in the upper floor having round heads. To the left are three doorways, windows and a pitching hole.	II*
Clapper bridge 54.17446°N 2.53074°W		Uncertain	The clapper bridge crosses Ireby Beck. It consists of two sandstone flags with a central stone pier.	II
