= Devil's Punch Bowl (disambiguation) =

The Devil's Punch Bowl is a large natural amphitheatre in Surrey, England.

Devil's Punch Bowl may also refer to:

== Antarctica ==
- Devils Punchbowl (Antarctica)

== UK ==
- Devil's Punchbowl or Devil's Cauldron, water eroded rock chambers directly below Devil's Bridge, Ceredigion, Wales
- Wurt Pit and Devil's Punchbowl, in Somerset, England
- The Devils Punchbowl, an alternative name for the Hole of Horcum, a fist shaped valley in the North York Moors

== Ireland ==
- Devil's Punchbowl (Kerry), a cirque on Mangerton Mountain in Killarney, County Kerry, Ireland

== United States ==
=== California ===
- Devil's Punchbowl (Angeles National Forest), an area of twisted sandstone formations along the San Andreas Fault in Los Angeles County
- Devil's Punch Bowl, a large, collapsed sea cave in the Russian Gulch State Park in Mendocino County
- Devils Punchbowl, a lake in the Siskiyou Wilderness in western Siskiyou County
- Devil's Punchbowl (Plumas County, California), a lake southeast of Taylorsville
- Devil's Punch Bowl, Inyo National Forest, a volcanic explosion crater that is part of the Mono-Inyo Craters chain

=== Colorado ===
- Devil's Punchbowl, a particularly treacherous section of Schofield Pass.
- Devil's Punchbowl, a recreational area near Independence Pass.

=== Mississippi ===
- Devil's Punchbowl (Natchez, Mississippi), a concentration camp created to control freed slaves
- Devil's Punch Bowl, Mississippi, a possible base of operations of bandit John Murrell

=== Nevada ===
- Devil's Punchbowl or Diana's Punchbowl, a geothermal feature in the Monitor Valley of Nevada

=== Oregon ===
- Devils Punch Bowl State Natural Area, large bowl naturally carved in a rock headland partially open to the Pacific Ocean on the Central Oregon Coast

=== Washington ===
- Devils Punch Bowl, a popular swimming and diving area in Lake Crescent, Washington state

== Canada ==
- Devil's Punch Bowl (Hamilton, Ontario), a waterfall area in Canada
