= Masongill =

Village in North Yorkshire, England

Coordinates: 54.17222°N 2.51543°W

- Location within North Yorkshire
- OS grid reference: SD664752
- Unitary authority: North Yorkshire
- Ceremonial county: North Yorkshire
- Region: Yorkshire and the Humber
- Country: England
- Sovereign state: United Kingdom
- Post town: CARNFORTH
- Postcode district: LA6
- Police: North Yorkshire
- Fire: North Yorkshire
- Ambulance: Yorkshire
- UK Parliament: Skipton and Ripon

Masongill is a small community on the western edge of the county of North Yorkshire, England. The village, in the Yorkshire Dales, lies near the border of Lancashire to the west, and the nearby hamlet of Ireby.

Until 1974 it was part of the West Riding of Yorkshire. From 1974 to 2023 it was part of the Craven District. It is now administered by the unitary North Yorkshire Council.

St Mary's Church, Ingleton, contains a memorial to one Randall Hopley Sherlock (brother of the vicar, Todd Sherlock) struck and killed by lightning at Ingleton station), and several locations in the area include the word Holme. Mary Doyle (mother of Arthur Conan Doyle) lived in Masongill from 1882 to 1917, and Conan Doyle (creator of Sherlock Holmes) was a frequent visitor. So some do wonder if the name of Sherlock Holmes came from Masongill. Doyle would have arrived by train at Ingleton (Midland) railway station and continued his journey to Masongill by cart. This would have taken him through Holme Head, below Ingleton Viaduct. Doyle married his first wife in 1885 at nearby St Oswald's Church, Thornton in Lonsdale.

Another person of interest in the history of Masongill is Bryan Charles Waller (1853–1932). Waller was Squire of Masongill from 1877 and, from 1879, he was a lecturer in Pathology at the University of Edinburgh, having already attained his MD there. During his time in Edinburgh he took lodgings with the Doyle family and quickly became a dominant factor in their lives. It was he who persuaded Conan Doyle to train as a doctor, and his mother to come and live in Masongill.

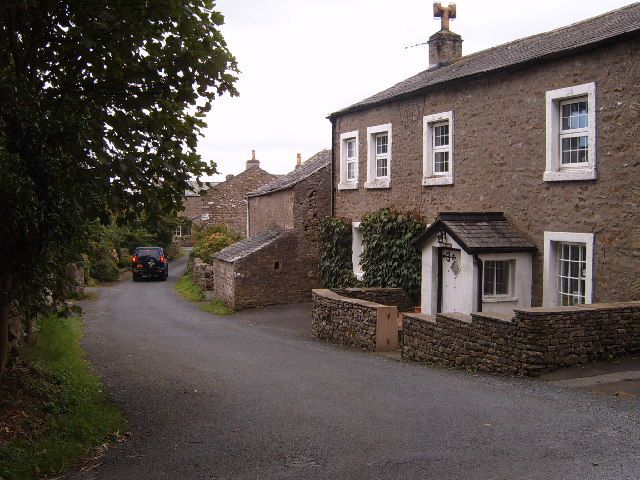
Street in Masongill

Doyle and Waller were big men with strong characters and their relationship deteriorated to such an extent that they came to blows. Waller was only 6 years older than Doyle, so 15 years younger than Mary. Also, Waller married in August 1896. Nevertheless, Mary Doyle remained as tenant of Masongill Cottage until 1917, when she moved south. She preferred the regular company of Waller to the irregular companionship of her son.

== See also ==
- Listed buildings in Thornton in Lonsdale
