= Richard Thornton (cricketer) =

English Anglican priest and cricketer

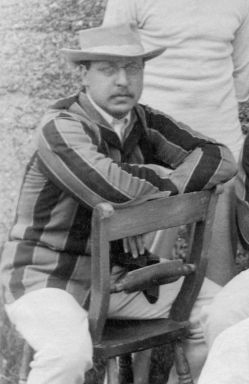
- Thornton in 1888

Personal information
- Full name: Richard Thornton Thornton
- Born: 28 March 1853; Folkestone, Kent
- Died: 30 May 1928 (aged 75); Eastbourne, Sussex
- Batting: Right-handed
- Bowling: Right-arm slow
- Relatives: Richard Thornton (grandfather); Richard Napoleon Thornton (father); Albert Thornton (brother); Walter Thornton (brother)

Domestic team information
- Years: Team
- 1872–1880: Dorset
- 1874–1902: Marylebone Cricket Club (MCC)
- 1874–1882: Devon
- 1875: Wiltshire
- 1881–1888: Kent
- 1885: EJ Sanders' XI
- FC debut: 2 June 1881 MCC v Kent
- Last FC: 25 May 1893 MCC v Cambridge University

Career statistics
Competition	First-class
Matches	66
Runs scored	2,021
Batting average	20.00
100s/50s	1/10
Top score	107
Balls bowled	124
Wickets	3
Bowling average	34.66
5 wickets in innings	0
10 wickets in match	0
Best bowling	2/16
Catches/stumpings	42/–
- Source: CricInfo, 5 December 2018

Reverend Richard Thornton Thornton (28 March 1853 – 30 May 1928), born Richard Thornton Lee, (Note: Thornton's father was born Richard Lee and was the illegitimate son of Richard Thornton, one of the richest men of the 19th century. Lee changed his surname to Thornton in 1865 as a condition of his father's will. Alumni Oxonienses gives Thornton's birth name and that of one of his brothers as Lee.) was an English clergyman and amateur cricketer active who played first-class cricket between 1881 and 1893, mainly for Kent County Cricket Club.

== Early life ==
Thornton was born at Folkestone in Kent, the eldest son of Richard Napoleon Thornton and his wife Margaret. He was privately educated before going up to St John's College, Oxford, where he matriculated in 1873. He graduated in 1876, winning a Blue in football whilst at Oxford although he did not play cricket for the university.

== Cricket career ==
Thornton played for Dorset before going up to university and later made minor cricket appearances for a variety of amateur teams, including the Gentlemen of Devon and Marylebone Cricket Club (MCC) who he played for between 1874 and 1902. He made his first-class cricket debut for MCC against Kent in 1880 before going on to play 45 times for Kent in first-class matches between 1881 and 1888. As well as making 14 first-class appearances for MCC he played for a variety of other teams and captained EJ Sanders' XI on their tour of North America in 1885. He played matches for a wide range of teams including Incogniti, Devon County Cricket Club, Wiltshire County Cricket Club and toured Portugal in 1895 with Tom Westray's XI.

In his Wisden obituary, Thornton was described as "a free-hitting bat and could bowl both slow-round and lobs", the latter being described as "very successful indeed in club games". In 66 first-class matches he scored one first-class century, making 107 runs for EJ Sanders' XI against the Gentlemen of Philadelphia in 1885, although in club cricket he made a number of high scores.

== Professional and later lie ==
Thornton was ordained as a priest in the Church of England at Chichester in 1878, becoming curate at Sidmouth where his parents owned property. He became a Clerk in Holy Orders and was chaplain to the 1st Volunteer Battalion of the Royal West Kent Regiment during the 1890s when he lived at Tunbridge Wells.

Thornton married Ellen Pulford in 1877 at Tormoham in Devon. The couple had four children before Ellen died in 1891, Thornton going on to marry Eliza Pulford, Ellen's sister, in 1897. His brothers, Albert and Walter both played first-class cricket, Albert for Kent and Walter for Oxford University. He died at Eastbourne in Sussex in 1928 aged 75.

== Bibliography ==
- Carlaw, Derek (2020). Kent County Cricketers, A to Z: Part One (1806–1914) (PDF). Cardiff: ACS.
