= Richard Lee (cricketer, born 1833) =

English cricketer

Personal information
- Full name: Richard Napoleon Lee
- Born: c. 1833; Clerkenwell, Middlesex, England
- Died: 28 May 1876 (aged 42/43); Sidmouth, Devon, England
- Relatives: Richard Thornton (father); Rev. Richard Thornton (son); Albert Thornton (son); Walter Thornton (son)

Career statistics
Competition	First-class
Matches	1
Runs scored	1
Batting average	0.00
100s/50s	0/0
Top score	1*
Catches/stumpings	0/–
- Source: Cricinfo, 29 September 2018

Richard Napoleon Lee (c. 1833 – 28 May 1876) was an English cricketer active in first-class cricket in 1852.

The illegitimate son of Richard Thornton and his housekeeper Alice Lee, he was born at Clerkenwell, Middlesex, in about 1833. He attended St John's College, Oxford, where he studied law. Lee made what would be his only appearance in first-class cricket in 1852, when he played for the Surrey Club against the Marylebone Cricket Club at The Oval. He was a barrister at the Middle Temple by 1861.

Lee later moved to Sidmouth, Devon, where he was appointed the Income Tax Commissioner for Devon. He died at Sidmouth on 28 May 1876, having changed his name to Richard Napoleon Thornton in 1865 as a condition laid down in his father's will. At some point he married Margaret James, who predeceased him. The couple had four children, with their three sons Richard, Albert and Walter all playing first-class cricket.
