= The Punch Bowl, Burton in Lonsdale =

Listed pub in North Yorkshire, England

The Punch Bowl
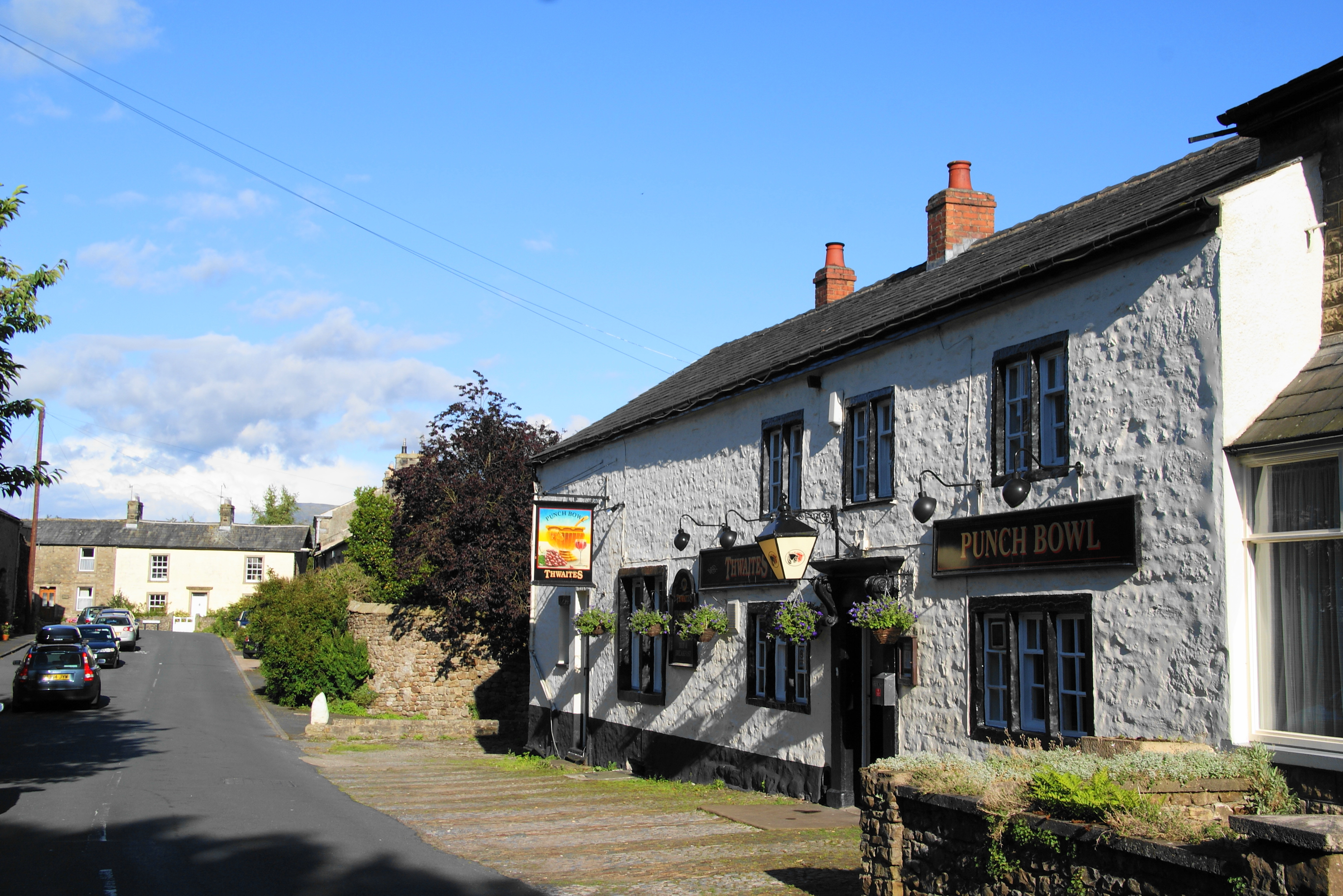
- The pub in 2010
- Interactive map of the The Punch Bowl area

General information
- Type: Public house; originally a coaching inn
- Location: Low Street, Burton in Lonsdale, North Yorkshire, England
- Coordinates: 54.14386°N 2.53317°W
- Year built: 18th century
- Renovated: 19th century (added)
- Owner: The Punch Bowl Inn, Burton in Lonsdale Ltd

Design and construction
- Designations

Listed Building – Grade II
- Official name: Punch Bowl Hotel
- Designated: 20 February 1958
- Reference no.: 1301217

Website
- punchbowlinnburton.com

The Punch Bowl is a historic pub on Low Street in Burton in Lonsdale, a village in North Yorkshire, England.

The building was constructed as a coaching inn in the 18th century, and extended in the 19th century. In the early 20th century, its stables were converted to enlarge the public areas. As the village grew with a pottery industry, it had at its peak 13 pubs, but with the decline of the industry, they closed, leaving only the Punch Bowl. The building was Grade II listed in 1958. In 2014, Thwaites Brewery sold the pub, at which time it was listed as an asset of community value. The pub became a free house, but was again put up for sale in 2024, with an asking price of £315,000. A group of villagers formed an organisation to explore bringing it into community ownership.

The two-storey pub is built of limewashed stone, with painted stone dressings, and a slate roof. The original part has three bays, a central doorway with a moulded hood, and mullioned windows containing casements and fixed lights. In the 19th-century extension to the left are a doorway and two windows.

== See also ==
- Listed buildings in Burton in Lonsdale
