= St Oswald's Church, Thornton in Lonsdale =

Coordinates: 54.1574°N 2.4827°W

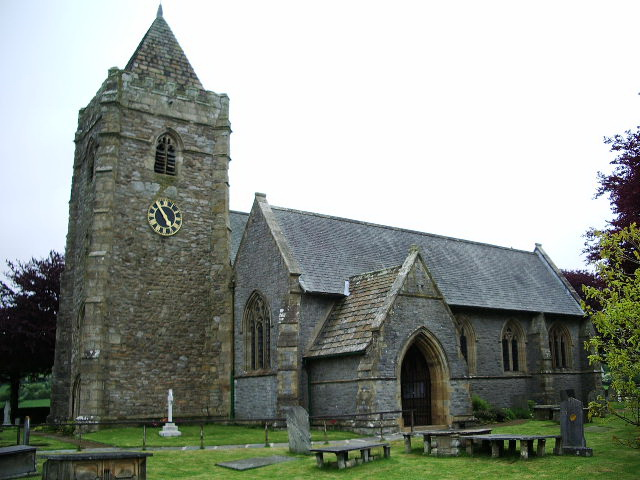
- St Oswald's Church, Thornton in Lonsdale, from the southwest

- Location in North Yorkshire
- OS grid reference: SD 686,736
- Location: Thornton in Lonsdale, North Yorkshire
- Country: England
- Denomination: Anglican
- Website: St Oswald, Thornton in Lonsdale

History
- Status: Parish church

Architecture
- Functional status: Active
- Heritage designation: Grade II*
- Designated: 20 February 1958
- Architect(s): Paley and Austin, Austin and Paley
- Architectural type: Church
- Style: Gothic, Gothic Revival
- Completed: 1935

Administration
- Province: York
- Diocese: Leeds
- Archdeaconry: Craven
- Deanery: Ewecross
- Parish: Thornton in Lonsdale

Clergy
- Vicar: Revd Denis Tate

St Oswald's Church is in the village of Thornton in Lonsdale, North Yorkshire, England. It is an active Anglican parish church in the deanery of Ewecross, the archdeaconry of Craven and the Diocese of Leeds. Its benefice is united with that of All Saints, Burton in Lonsdale. The church is recorded in the National Heritage List for England as a designated Grade II* listed building.

== History ==
The tower dates from the 15th century. In 1868–70 the church, other than the tower and three Norman arches, was rebuilt in Perpendicular style by the Lancaster architects Paley and Austin. This cost £5,000 (equivalent to £510,000 as of 2025), and was paid for from the will of Felix Slade, after whom the Slade School of Fine Art was named, and who had lived in a house nearby. The church was damaged by a fire in February 1933, and was rebuilt in 1934–35 by Austin and Paley at a cost of about £9,000.

== Architecture ==
The church is constructed in limestone rubble with sandstone dressings, and has Westmorland slate roofs. The plan consists of a four-bay nave, north and south aisles with chapels, a two-bay chancel, a south porch, and a west tower. The tower is in four stages with diagonal buttresses and an embattled parapet. It has a west doorway with a pointed arch, over which is a three-light window. Above this is small ogee-headed window. The bell openings have two lights. The tower is surmounted by a 19th-century pyramidal spire and a lead finial. The windows on the sides of the church have two or three lights, and the east window has four lights with trefoil heads. Inside the church, some of the arcades have pointed arches, while others are in Norman style. The earliest memorials in the church are to the Redmayne family, dating from 1678.

== See also ==
- Grade II* listed buildings in North Yorkshire (district)
- Listed buildings in Thornton in Lonsdale
- List of ecclesiastical works by Paley and Austin
