= Devil's Punchbowl (Natchez, Mississippi) =

American Civil War refugee camp

Coordinates: 31.5842°N 91.4001°W

The Devil's Punchbowl was a concentration camp created in Natchez, Mississippi after the American Civil War in an attempt to address a huge influx of self-emancipated enslaved persons. A number of compounding issues led to a large number of deaths. Historians place the number of deaths at 20,000.

== Description ==
In order to house the large numbers of formerly-enslaved African Americans, the Union Army created a camp for them at a location known as the Devil's Punchbowl, a natural pit surrounded by bluffs. Many of the formerly enslaved there died of starvation, smallpox, and other diseases. Historian Clifford Boxley writes that the deaths resulted from Natchez' "huge influx of refugee ex-slaves that the union was not equipped to handle" and that the deaths were not intentional.

Author David Ottenheimer describes the situation at Devil's Punchbowl as a "completely manufactured crisis by the defeated Confederate loyalists, which was designed to maximize the suffering of emancipated slaves," noting that slaveholders released old and very young slaves to become refugees and kept captive the able-bodied.

Estimates of the number of people who died at the Devil's Punchbowl vary, with a low end estimate of 2,000. A frequent claim by supporters of the Confederate States of America's legacy is that 20,000 formerly enslaved people died at Devil's Punchbowl. No evidence for this number exists. History professor Jim Wiggins contends the 20,000 estimate is baseless and inflated tenfold. Boxley describes the story as "concocted Confederate propaganda" aiming to cast the Union Army in a negative light.
