= Burton in Lonsdale Castle =

Former castle in North Yorkshire, England

Coordinates: 54.14352°N 2.53881°W

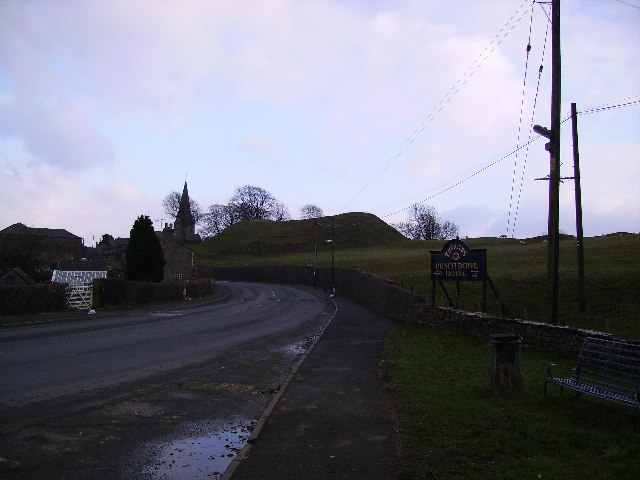
Earthworks of the former castle in Burton

Burton in Lonsdale Castle was in the village of Burton in Lonsdale in North Yorkshire, England (grid reference SD649721).

The Pipe Rolls for the reign of Henry II record that the castle's garrison in 1129–1130 consisted of a knight, ten sergeants, a gatekeeper, and a watchman.

This was a motte castle with two baileys. In 1322 it was confiscated from the Mowbrays who had been in opposition to King Edward II.

The mound is still visible.
