= Dick Thornton =

Dick Thornton is the name of:

- Dick Thornton (American football) (1908–1973), American football quarterback for the Philadelphia Eagles
- Dick Thornton (Canadian football) (1939–2014), Canadian football wide receiver and defensive back for the Winnipeg Blue Bombers and Toronto Argonauts
