= Diana's Punchbowl =

Thermal spring

- Devil's Cauldron
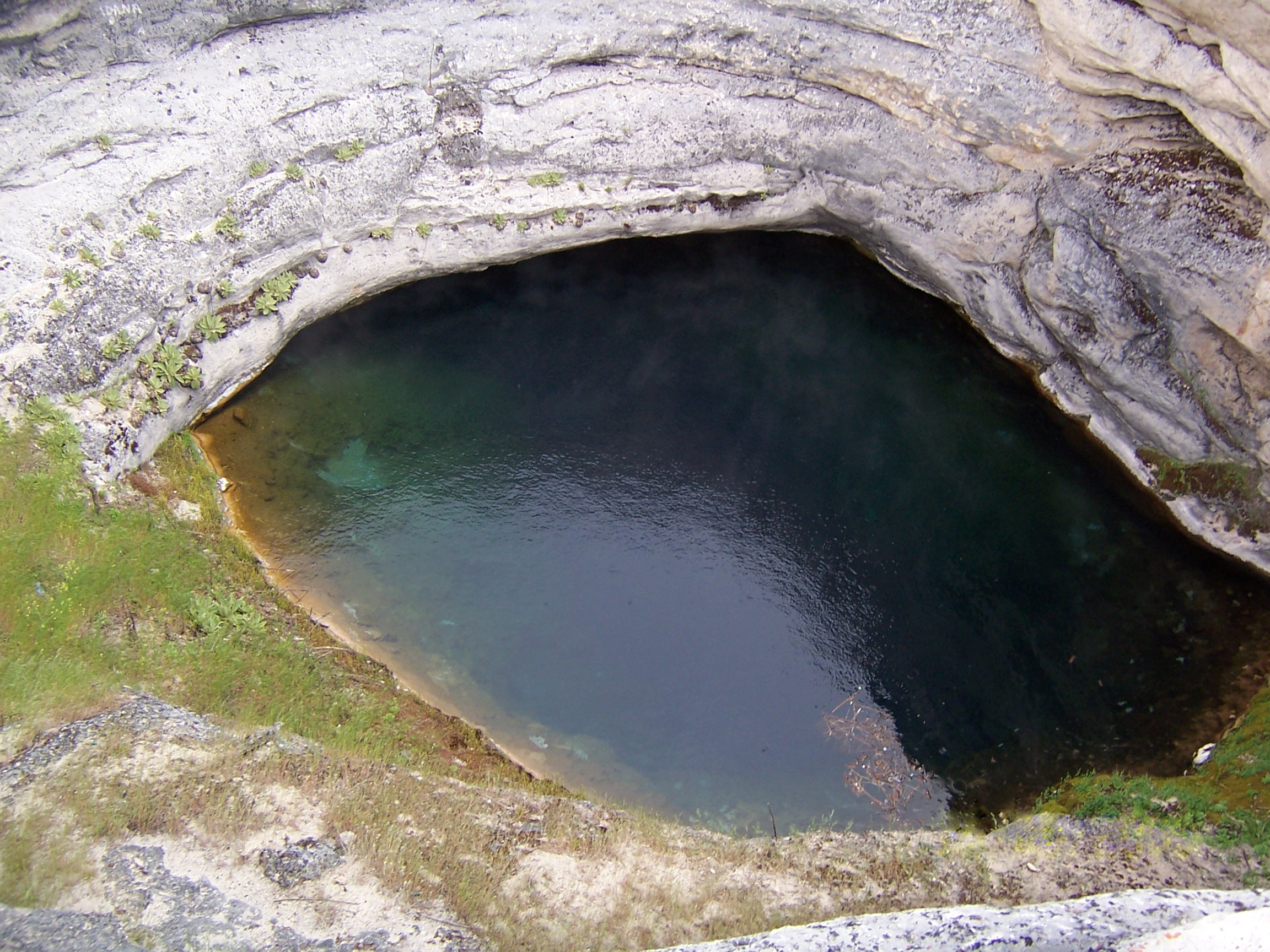
- Looking down into Diana's Punchbowl

- Location within Nevada
- Interactive map of Diana's Punchbowl
- Location: Monitor Valley, Nye County, Nevada
- Coordinates: 39°01′49″N 116°40′00″W
- Elevation: 6,760 feet (2,060.4 m)
- Type: hot spring
- Temperature: 140.9 °F (60.5 °C)

Diana's Punchbowl, also called the Devil's Cauldron, is a geothermal feature located on a small fault in Nye County, Nevada. The spring is exposed through a cup-shaped depression about 50 feet (15 m) in diameter at the top of a domelike hill of travertine about 600 feet (180 m) in diameter. Hot water in the pool of the bowl is about 30 feet (9 m) below the rim.

== Geography ==
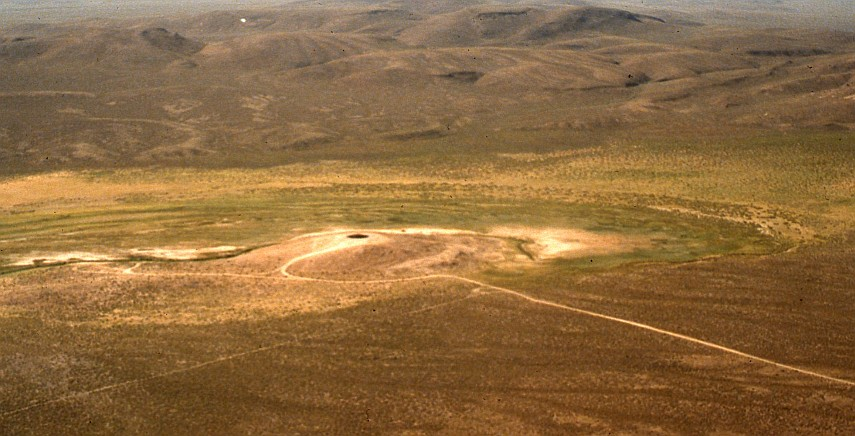
Diana's Punchbowl is on top of a travertine hill

Near the geographic center of Nevada, Diana's Punchbowl or the Devil's Cauldron, is formed in the geothermically active portion of the Great Basin. It is located in central-western Nevada, in the Monitor Valley, about 30 miles southeast of Austin, Nevada in Nye County. Diana's Punchbowl is just east of Monitor Valley Road about 9 miles south of Monitor Ranch. The bowl is at the top of a travertine hill. It is 50 feet across and 30 feet deep. The extreme water temperature of this feature is estimated to be 200 °F (93 °C). The hot mineral water flows into a hot creek allowing it to cool to approximately 100 °F at the far end of the creek. Several rock pools have been created along the creek.
