= Burton in Lonsdale =

Village and civil parish in North Yorkshire, England

Coordinates: 54°08′42″N 2°32′02″W

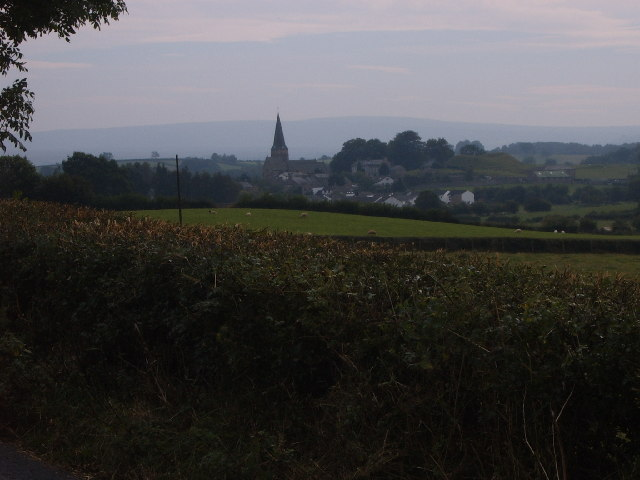
- Looking south to Burton in Lonsdale

- Location within North Yorkshire
- Population: 579 (2011 census)
- OS grid reference: SD651722
- Civil parish: Burton in Lonsdale
- Unitary authority: North Yorkshire
- Ceremonial county: North Yorkshire
- Region: Yorkshire and the Humber
- Country: England
- Sovereign state: United Kingdom
- Post town: CARNFORTH
- Postcode district: LA6
- Police: North Yorkshire
- Fire: North Yorkshire
- Ambulance: Yorkshire
- UK Parliament: Skipton and Ripon

Burton in Lonsdale is a village and civil parish in North Yorkshire, England, close to the border with Lancashire and Cumbria. It is in Lonsdale (the River Lune valley and its tributaries). The parish is approximately 1,500 acres (6 km^{2}) in area and has many farms – dairy, beef and sheep. Little is grown, except grass to feed the animals.

The village was historically part of the West Riding of Yorkshire until 1974. From 1974 to 2023 it was part of the Craven District, it is now administered by the unitary North Yorkshire Council.

Formerly famous for country pottery, it is now a quiet village situated between two national parks (the Lake District National Park and the Yorkshire Dales National Park) and by the side of the River Greta.

== History ==
The settlement is mentioned in the Domesday Book as being in the Hundred of Amounderness, later being recorded in the wapentake of Ewecross. The name derives from the Old English burh-tūn, a farmstead with, or near, a fortification (the castle). It was first recorded in 1130 as being either Burtona de Lanesdala, Burton(a) in Lanesdala, or Burton(a) in Lanesdale. The village contains a motte that is the remains of Burton in Lonsdale Castle. The castle belonged to the Mowbray family, and is believed to have been abandoned sometime in the middle of the 14th century.

In his will of 1593 Henry the 4th Earl of Derby bequeathed his manor of Burton In Lonsdale to his second son the Hon William Stanley who less than two years later became the 6th Earl after the poisoning of his older brother Ferdinando the 5th Earl.

Stoneware and earthenware pottery was produced between about 1650 and 1944, in a total of thirteen potteries, using locally available clay and coal. It is said Burton was known as 'Black Burton' because of the amount of smoke produced by the kilns' fires when firing pots. The firing was carried out over several days at a time, on a regular basis. The quality of the coal (initially locally sourced) was to blame for the amount of smoke. This was eventually replaced by better coal from South and West Yorkshire when the railways arrived in the locality. Burton pottery is notoriously difficult to identify as most potteries did not mark their products. Coal and clay were readily available from the Ingleton Coalfield, which outcropped at Burton in Lonsdale.

The River Greta winds its way past the village to the south. Several woodlands are sited on the banks of the river, some of them ancient. The paths leading to the wood has pottery remnants strewn across them.

== Modern village ==
In 2001, the census recorded 579 people living in the civil parish, which was unchanged at the 2011 Census. In 2015, North Yorkshire County Council estimated the population to be 600. The village has a community-run shop (containing a small post-office) where local goods such as meats, cheeses and vegetables are available. It also has a pub, The Punch Bowl.

In August 2014 the village founded a road cycling club called Lonsdale Wheelers CC. The club meets on the first and third Sundays of every month with a 10.00 start from the village shop.

The Village Hall hosts a number of regular clubs and events, details on the Village Hall page. Events include circuit training, a monthly music night, a WI group and karate.

Also for the 2014–15 season a football club, Burton United F.C, was formed and admitted into the North Lancashire and District Football League. The club however folded at the end of the 2015–16 season. The club played their home games at Burton recreation ground.

The village school closed in 2014, after pupil numbers fell to 13. The school had been built in 1853, with money donated by Richard Thornton, a millionaire who had been born in the village. Pupils now travel to Bentham for schooling. The nearest railway station is at Bentham, some 3 miles (5 km) away, and the town of Settle is 12 miles (19 km) to the south-east.

== Notable people ==
- Laurence Binyon (1869–1943), poet who wrote For the Fallen, lived in the village between 1870 and 1875. The view of Ingleborough influenced his poem Inheritance
- James Dyson (1914–1990), physicist who lived in the village in his childhood
- Geoffrey Holmes, historian, lived in Burton in Lonsdale from 1969 onwards
- Richard Thornton (1776–1865), the Victorian millionaire was born in Burton in Lonsdale. He donated £10,000 (equivalent to £1,086,000 in 2025) to fund a school in the village.

== See also ==
- Listed buildings in Burton in Lonsdale
- William Stanley, 6th Earl of Derby
