= Punchbowl, Inc. =

American software company

- Type: Private
- Industry: Online invitations, software
- Founded: 2006
- Founder: Matt Douglas (CEO); Sean Conta (CXO)
- Headquarters: Framingham, MA, USA
- Website: www.punchbowl.com

Punchbowl, Inc. is a social planning software developer based in Framingham, Massachusetts. The company runs Punchbowl.com, a web-based online invitations service and digital greeting cards site.

== History ==
Punchbowl was founded by Matt Douglas and Sean Conta, who previously worked together at Bose Corporation. The company was incorporated on April 11, 2006. However, it was officially launched on January 15, 2007, under the name MyPunchbowl.com as a free site for party planning.

The company was funded by Contour Venture Partners, Intel Capital, and eCoast Angels, receiving its seed round of funding on October 2, 2007, from lead investor Intel Capital. On September 16, 2008, Punchbowl announced its Series A round of funding in the amount of $2.1 million led by Contour Venture Partners.

In October 2014, Punchbowl unveiled a new user interface and launched the “Characters Kids Love” invitation collection which has grown to include collaborations with Disney, Nickelodeon, Sanrio, Hasbro, and more. The collection includes hundreds of branded invitations that feature characters from Marvel, PAW Patrol, Peppa Pig, Barbie, Sesame Street, Hello Kitty, My Little Pony, Transformers, and others.

== Awards ==
- Webby Award Honoree, Events, 2008
- Massachusetts Innovation & Technology Exchange (MITX) Award for Usability, 2008
- MITX Innovation Award, Best Consumer Tech that Makes Life Easier, 2011
- MITX Innovation Award, Best UX, 2015
