= Richard Thornton =

English merchant, trader and millionaire (20 September 1776 – 20 June 1865)

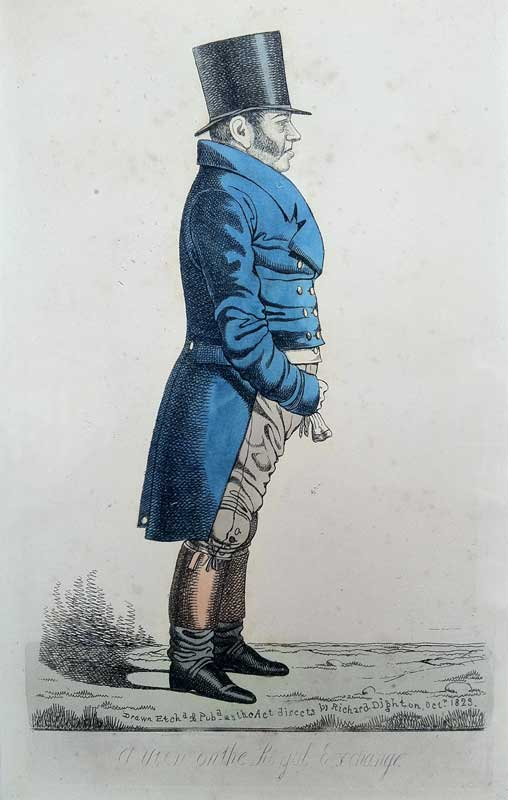
- ‘A view on the Royal Exchange’. A Portrait of Richard Thornton by Richard Dighton, October 1823
- Born: 20 September 1776; Burton-in-Lonsdale, England
- Died: 20 June 1865 (aged 88); Merton, England
- Children: Richard Napoleon Lee

Richard Thornton (20 September 1776 – 20 June 1865) was an English millionaire. He died in Merton, Surrey and is buried at West Norwood Cemetery in London. On his death, Richard Thornton left an estate of £2,800,000, which is the largest fortune to have been valued for probate in Great Britain before 1870. Richard Thornton was a merchant and trader, notably in Baltic goods. He was also a Liveryman of the Leathersellers' Company (a Livery Company of the City of London), of which he became Master in 1836. He personally funded the new almshouses built for the Leathersellers' Company at Barnet, where his bust (by Thomas Earle) is still preserved and a nearby road is named Thornton Road in his honour. The Leathersellers' Company also has a portrait of Thornton painted in 1838 by Frederick Yeates Hurlstone.

== Background ==
Richard Thornton was born in Burton-in-Lonsdale, West Riding of Yorkshire. He later funded a primary school and a church building in the village. He was educated at Christ's Hospital, Newgate Street, London from 1785 to 1791. He became a Donation Governor of Christ's Hospital in 1833.

== Wealth and obscurity ==
Richard Thornton's wealth was remarkable. At his death in 1865, his estate of £2.8m was one of the largest ever recorded. That figure equalled 0.35% of the net national income of the day, or £3.9bn in 2007 terms, which makes him the 165th richest Briton since 1066. Yet, as the eminent historian W G Hoskins noted in his article for the magazine History Today, his name means nothing today, even though in his lifetime his wealth rivalled that of the Rothschilds and the Barings.

== Profiting from the Baltic blockade ==
Richard Thornton made part of his fortune as an indirect result of Napoleon's fatal and failed invasion of Russia. During this campaign the French army was stationed at Danzig from where it guarded every Baltic port. The Danish were strong supporters of Napoleon and their hostility to English trade was considerable: captains of Danish ships were threatened with death should they engage in any form of commerce with England. This made valuable and essential Baltic trade difficult and dangerous for English merchant ships.

In response Richard Thornton armed one of his own merchant ships, fought off a hostile Danish gunboat, and landed in the Baltic under an assumed German name. In the process he secured essential supplies of Baltic hemp for the Royal Navy at considerable profit to himself.

Richard Thornton's lucrative Baltic trade continued and two years later, in 1812, his brother Laurence was in the port of Memel, now known as Klaipėda, when he heard of Napoleon's retreat from Moscow. He got word back to Richard in London so speedily that it was three days before the news reached any one else in the city, including members of the British Government. Realizing this, Richard Thornton went quickly about the city obtaining signatures on contracts for the forward delivery of Baltic goods. Since the contract prices were inflated by the blockade which had now been removed, his already sizable profits became significantly greater.

Richard Thornton's activities in the Baltic earned him the nickname “The Duke of Danzig”.
