= Forrest (surname) =

Forrest is a surname of English and Scottish origins. This name derives from the Old French "forest" (Latin "foreste(m)", a derivative of "foris" meaning "outside"). The word was introduced by the Normans, and referred to a Royal Forest. Variants include Forest, De Forest, De Forrest, DeForest and DeForrest. Forrest is associated with Clan Forrester and Clan Douglas. Variants of the name are first recorded in England in the early 13th century. Hugh de Foresta is mentioned in the Curia Regis rolls in 1204. There was a Templar knight, Guy de Foresta, who was Master of the Temple, n 1290–1294. One Adam ate forest appears in the Subsidy Rolls of Kent in 1300. In Scotland the name is first mentioned in the Morton Register of 1376 where William de Forest is found in Newlands, Scottish Borders. Morgan de Forest is found in Aberdeen in 1402, and a William of Forest was physician to the Queen in 1430. In 1505 John Forrest is recorded as succeeding his father John as owner of Gamelshiel castle in East Lothian. The name is first recorded in Ireland in 1566 where Piers Forest was a merchant in Cork. The Forrest baronets of Comiston in Edinburgh had a coat of arms containing three oak trees and the motto "vivunt dum virent" (they live while green). The prominent pioneer family of Western Australia, including Sir John Forrest, also have this motto and similar arms in their history.

== Notable people ==
- Alex Forrest (footballer), Scottish footballer
- Alexander Forrest, Australian explorer and politician
- Andrew Forrest, Australian mining entrepreneur
- Anne Marie Forrest, Irish writer
- Anthony Alexander Forrest, Australian rules footballer and soldier
- April Forrest, singer in girlgroup Jada
- Arthur J. Forrest, Medal of Honor recipient
- Barbara Forrest, philosopher and critic of intelligent design
- Catriona Forrest, Scottish field hockey player
- Chuck Forrest, American Jeopardy! champion
- Craig Forrest, Canadian soccer/football player
- Dan Forrest, American composer
- Darrick Forrest (born 1999), American football player
- David Forrest (disambiguation), multiple people
- Edwin Forrest, American actor
- Emmett Forrest (1927–2013), American collector and museum founder
- Eric Forrest, bass guitarist
- Frederic Forrest, American actor
- French Forrest, American Confederate naval officer
- George Forrest, several people
- Hal Forrest, American comics artist
- Helen Forrest, American big band singer
- Henry Garnet Forrest (1895–1945), Australian pilot
- Ina Forrest, Canadian wheelchair curler
- James Forrest (disambiguation), several people
- Jason Forrest, electronic music producer
- Jeffrey E. Forrest, slave trader, Confederate officer
- Jessica Forrest (born 1990), British actress
- Jim Forrest, Scottish curler, European champion
- John Forrest (disambiguation), several people
- Joseph King Cummins Forrest, a founder of the Chicago Tribune
- J.D. Forrest, American ice hockey player
- Katherine V. Forrest, American writer
- Kevin Forrest, American soccer player
- Linn A. Forrest, American architect
- Margaret Forrest, wife of John Forrest the explorer
- Mary Forrest (1869–1965), American historian
- Mistress Forrest (née Margaret Foxe), First lady colonist of Virginia
- Maureen Milgram Forrest (1938–2013), British businesswoman
- Nathan Bedford Forrest, Confederate general, first Grand Wizard of the Ku Klux Klan
- Nathan Bedford Forrest II, white supremacist
- Nathan Bedford Forrest III, American general
- Nita Forrest (1926–1996), Canadian artist
- Paula Forrest, Australian actress
- Peter Forrest, Australian cricketer
- Ray Forrest, American radio announcer
- Ruth Forrest, Tasmanian politician
- Sally Forrest, American actress
- Sam Forrest, singer and guitarist
- Steve Forrest (actor) (1925–2013), American actor
- Steve Forrest (musician), rock music drummer
- Susan Forrest, Australian genomics expert
- Ted Forrest, American poker player
- Thomas Forrest (politician), American politician
- Thomas Forrest (colonist) (1572–1641), Virginia Company Financier, husband of the first woman to come to America in 1608
- Tom Forrest, American football player
- Uriah Forrest (1746–1805), Revolutionary War hero, U.S. Congressman for Maryland, and descendant of Thomas Forrest, Esq
- Vernon Forrest (1971–2009), American boxer
- William Forrest (1902–1989), an American film actor
- William Forrest (disambiguation), several people

== Fictional characters ==
- Duke Forrest, a character from the M*A*S*H novels
- Admiral Maxwell Forrest, a recurring character on Star Trek: Enterprise
- Emmett Forrest, Elle Woods’ love interest in the musical adaptation of the film Legally Blonde. In the movie, his last name is Richmond instead.

== See also ==
- Forest (disambiguation)
