= James Forrest =

James, Jim or Jimmy Forrest may refer to:

== Sports ==
- James Forrest (rugby union) (1907–1981), Scotland international rugby union player
- James Forrest (baseball) (1897–1977), American baseball player
- James Forrest (basketball) (born 1972), American basketball player
- James Forrest (footballer, born 1894), Scottish footballer
- James Forrest (footballer, born 1991), Scottish footballer
- James Forrest (New Zealand cricketer) (born 1974), New Zealand cricketer
- James Forrest (South African cricketer) (1921–2010), South African cricketer
- Jim Forrest (curler), Scottish curler
- Jim Forrest (footballer, born 1927) (1927–1992), Scottish footballer
- Jim Forrest (footballer) (1944–2023), Scottish footballer
- Jimmy Forrest (footballer) (1864–1925), Blackburn Rovers and England footballer

== Others ==
- Sir James Forrest, 1st Baronet (1780–1860), Lord Provost of Edinburgh
- James Alexander Forrest (1905–1990), Australian lawyer, businessman and philanthropist
- James Forrest (actor), American actor
- James Forrest (engineer) (1825–1917), British civil engineer
- Jimmy Forrest (musician) (1920–1980), American jazz saxophonist
- James Forrest (adventurer), English adventurer, hiker and author
- James Forrest (comics), fictional character from DC Comics

== See also ==
- James Goodwin Forest, forest near Carthage, North Carolina
