= Old Parish Church =

Old Parish Church may refer to the following churches in Scotland:

- Govan Old Parish Church
- Hamilton Old Parish Church
- Lesmahagow Old Parish Church
- Old Parish Church of Peebles
- Peterhead Old Parish Church

== See also ==
- Parish church
