= Abbeygreen Church =

Church in Scotland

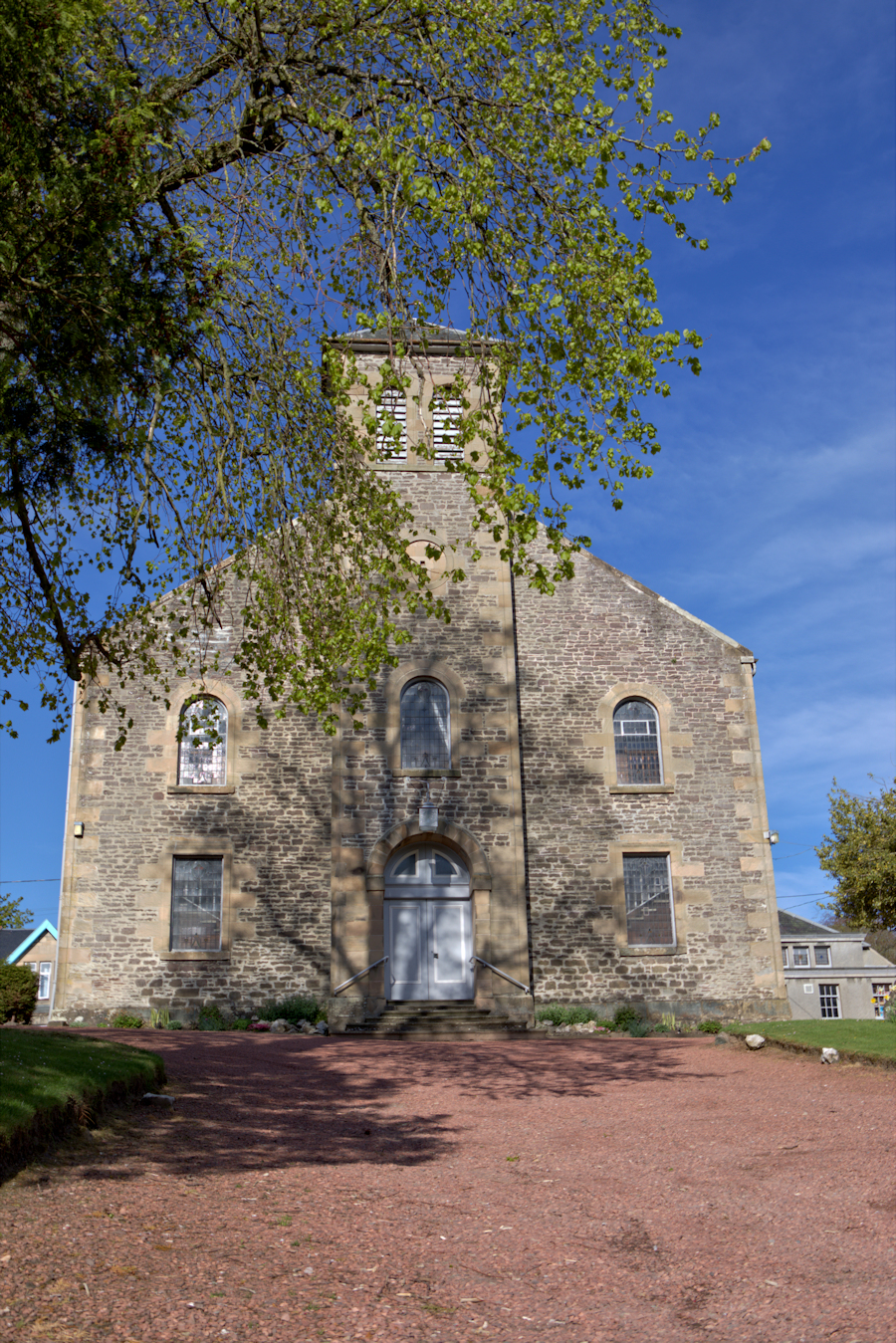
- Abbeygreen Church
- 55.64057°N 3.886878°W
- Denomination: Free Church of Scotland
- Churchmanship: Christian, Protestant, Presbyterian, Reformed
- Website: Abbeygreen, Scottish Reformed Conference

Administration
- Parish: Abbeygreen Parish

Abbeygreen Church is a congregation of the Free Church of Scotland in the small town of Lesmahagow, Lanarkshire. As a Christian congregation, it is presbyterian and reformed; holding the Word of God, the Holy Bible, as the supreme rule of life and doctrine and as a subordinate standard, the Westminster Confession of Faith which helps explain the doctrines of the Christian faith. Being Presbyterian, it serves as part of the Free Church of Scotland Presbytery of Glasgow and Argyll and seeks to faithfully serve God in Lesmahagow and the surrounding area. Having a missional outlook it is involved with a number of missionary organizations including, but not only, UFM Worldwide and Rose of Sharon Ministries, and helps with the organization and support of the Scottish Reformed Conference.

The congregation was formed during the Disruption of 1843. Its foundation stone was laid in August 1843 and the church opened on 15 February 1844. The church building, its manse and grounds are directly west of the Glebe Park on Abbeygreen. The congregation of Abbeygreen was formed out of the Parish Church of Lesmahagow by secession from the Church of Scotland in 1843. Lesmahagow Old Parish Church was built, in its present form, in 1804, at the site of the medieval Lesmahagow Priory.

== A summary of the history of Abbeygreen Church ==
The history of Abbeygreen Church begins in 1843 with the Disruption. The Disruption was a secession of ministers and congregations from the Church of Scotland which took place at the 1843 General Assembly because of the Church of Scotland continuing to allow state, or secular, interference in its independent government under the authority of Christ, and Christ alone. At that meeting one hundred and twenty one ministers and seventy three elders, led by Dr. David Welsh, as outgoing Moderator of the Church of Scotland, read a protest to the General Assembly and then left. They assembled themselves as the first General Assembly of the Free Church of Scotland at Tanfield Hall in the Canonmills area of Edinburgh on 18 May 1843, with Thomas Chalmers presiding as Moderator.

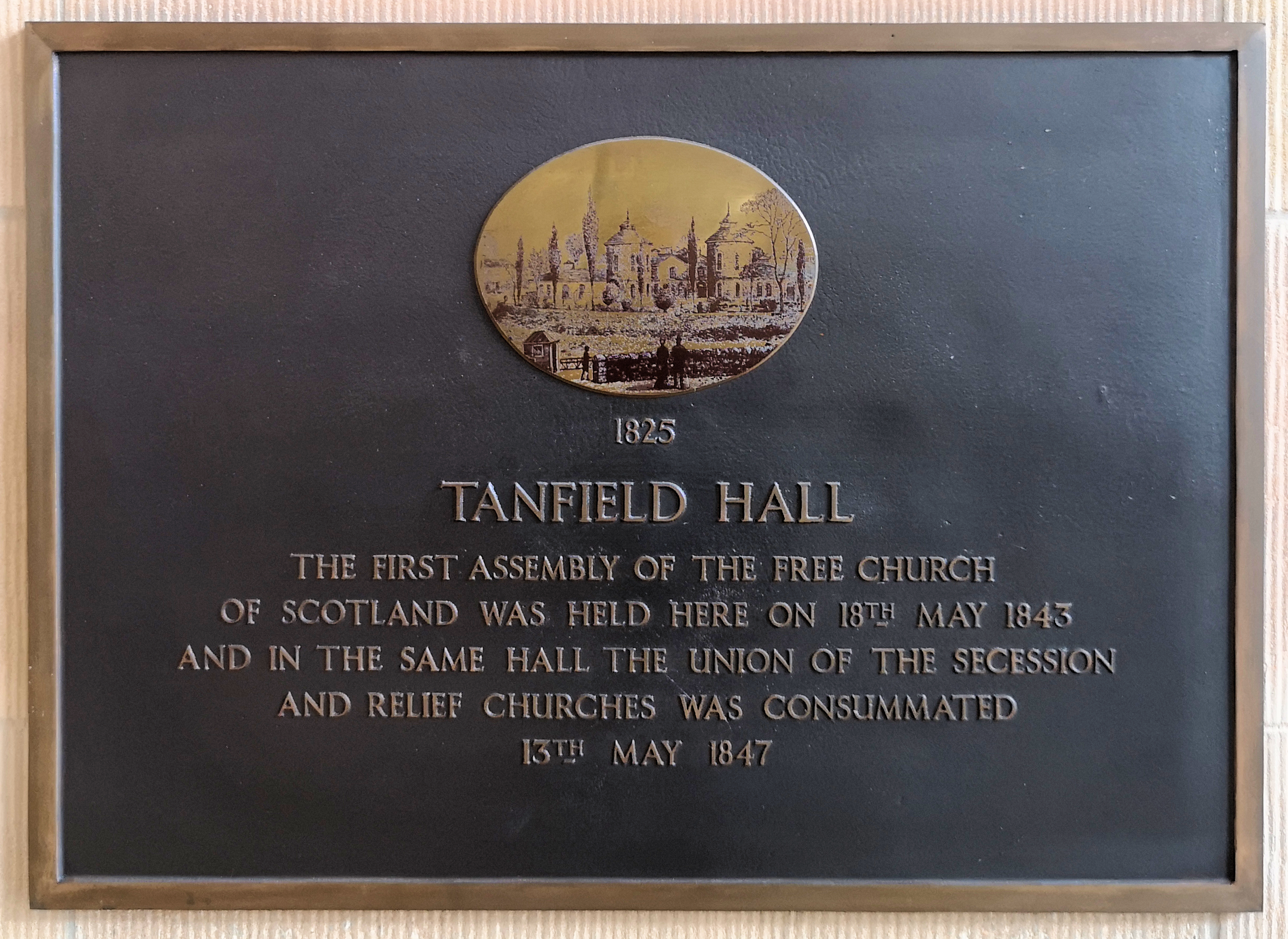
Plaque on the wall of 1 Tanfield, Canonmills, Edinburgh: Memorial to the first General Assembly of the Free Church of Scotland and to the 1847 unification of the United Secession and Relief Churches to form the United Presbyterian Church.

In all 474 ministers left the Church of Scotland to form the Free Church of Scotland in 1843. In 1900, a majority of the Free Church joined with the United Presbyterian Church to form the United Free Church of Scotland, with the remainder of the Free Church continuing as the present day Free Church of Scotland. In 1929, a majority of the United Free Church of Scotland joined to the Church of Scotland. The history of Abbeygreen followed these unions and mergers until, in September 2019, Abbeygreen Church (congregation, elders and minister) intimated, to the Presbytery of Lanark, its unanimous decision to leave the Church of Scotland. That process was completed on 26 March 2020 and Abbeygreen then returned to the Free Church on 31 March 2020.

== The Church in Lesmahagow prior to the Disruption ==
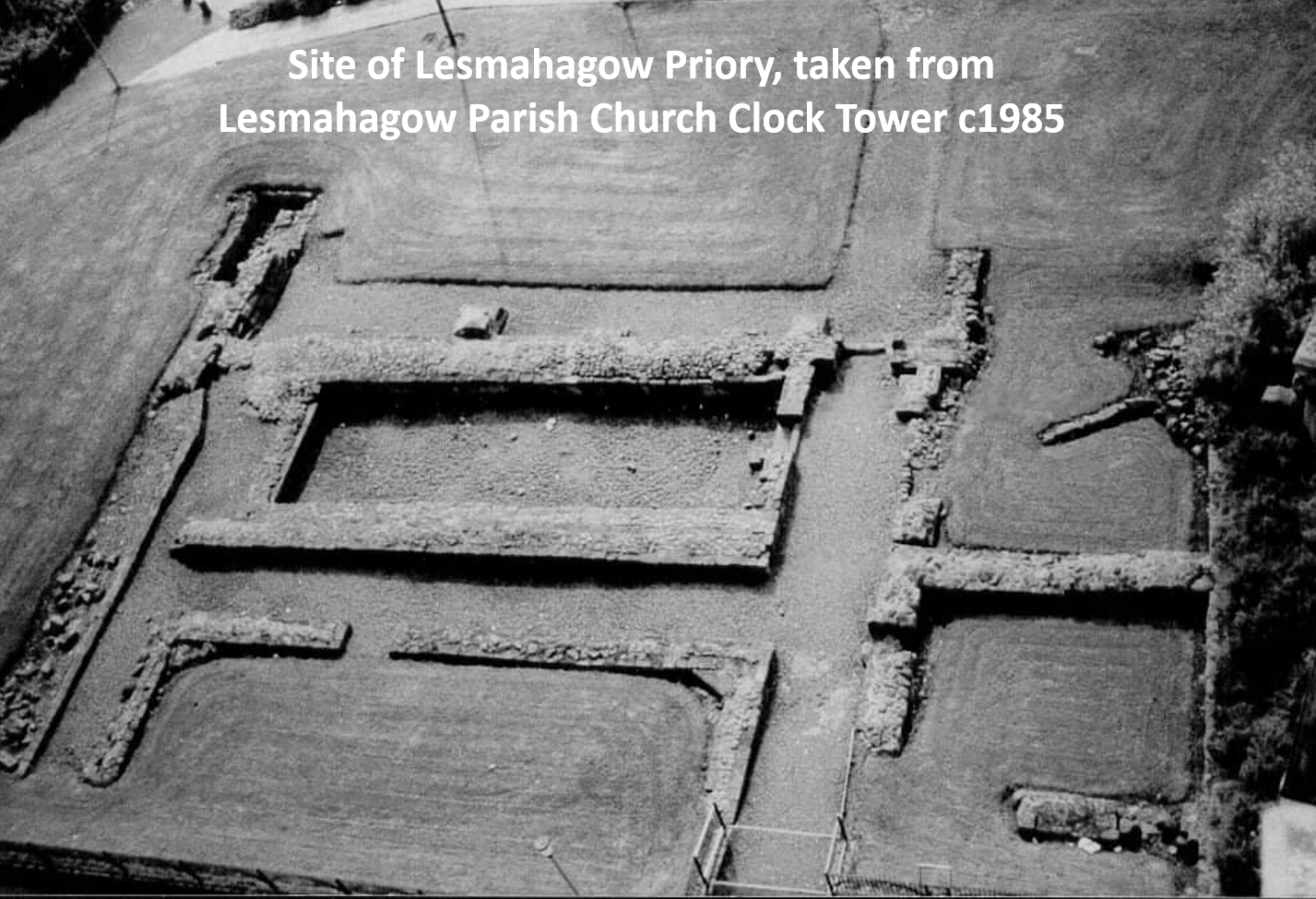
View of the site of Lesmahagow Priory c.1985

Documented history of Christianity in the Lesmahagow area may be traced back to, at least, the 12th century with the establishment of a church dedicated to Saint Machutus or (Saint Malo). The first Prior of Lesmahagow is recorded as Osbert, who became Abbot of Kelso in 1180. The dedication of the priory to Saint Machutus, or Saint Machute as he is referred to locally, remained after the gift of "the Church and lands of Lesmahagow" by King David I of Scotland in 1144 to the Tironensian Order of Benedictine monks who established Kelso Abbey. The remains of Lesmahagow Priory or "Abbey", may still be seen today, adjacent to Lesmahagow Old Parish Church. It is from this "Abbey" that both Abbeygreen, the main road through Lesmahagow, and Abbeygreen Church derive their names.

Timeline of the evolution of the churches of Scotland from the Reformation

The Scottish Reformation of 1560 led to the church in the area becoming part of the Church of Scotland. Lesmahagow and the surrounding area were not unaffected by the politico-religious turmoil following the 1603 Union of the Crowns and the events of the 17th century. Particularly in the relationship between church and state. This is testified to today by the many monuments in the local area to Covenanters or men associated with the Covenanters and their sacrifices during the Covenanting period in the 1600s:

- William Lawrie's Memorial: At the Dovecot in Blackwood Estate. William Lawrie took part in the Pentland Rising of 1666 who, while found guilty of treason on 7 February 1683 and sentenced to be executed, survived until after the Revolution Settlement and was subsequently pardoned.
- James Gavin's Cairn: James Gavin of Douglas had his ears cut off by John Graham of Claverhouse in 1684 and was banished to Barbados.
- Auchengilloch Conventicle Memorial: Auchengilloch is a moorland area West of the present-day Kype and Logan reservoirs near Lesmahagow which was used for conventicles.
- John Brown's Gravestone: John Brown was captured and executed by Lieutenant Murray around April 1685 in Blackwood Estate.
- Memorial to David Steel: & David Steel's Gravestone David Steel, being a shepherd at Skellyhill farm, was martyred near his farm on 20 December 1686 at the age of 33 under the orders of Lieutenant John Crichton.
- Memorial to Thomas Linning: Thomas Linning (whose name has been variously written as "Lining" or "Linen") held many conventicles in the Lesmahagow area and took part in the renewing of the Covenants at Boreland (or Borland) Hill in 1689 in the Lesmahagow area. He became leader of the Societies People or Covenanters after the execution of James Renwick on 17 February 1688. In February 1691, Thomas Linning was called to be minister of Lesmahagow Parish Church of Scotland and admitted to the charge on 13 May 1691, for which he, along with Alexander Shields and William Boyd, received the condemnation of many of the Societies people. After his death on 18 October 1733, Thomas Linning was termed "one of the most eminent clergymen in his day and an able defender of the rights and privileges of the church: scrupulously honest in his principles and well skilled in church discipline"

It is very clear that at the beginning of the 19th century, the memory of the Covenanting period and the Killing Times was still very current in Lesmahagow. More particularly, the village was keenly aware of the problems caused within and for the Church of Scotland by the effects of the Revolution Settlement in Scotland and then again by the 1701 Act of Settlement and the following 1711 Patronage Act which reinstated the right of lay patronage in 1712. This is witnessed by the presence in the village and surrounding area of congregations worshipping with and adhering to the ministry and discipline of the Covenanters or Societies people, the Secession church, arising from the 1733 secession, and the Relief Church, arising from the 1761 secession. Each of these secessions from the established Church of Scotland were in relation to the same issues over church governance and patronage. At the time of the Disruption, it seems more than possible that the village of Lesmahagow was keenly aware of the very real spiritual issues relating to patronage; that is, that congregations did not have the freedom, under the leading and direction of God, to call their own minister and be guided in the faith by that minister. This is evidenced through the events which played out within the village from 1839 to 1843 relating to the different congregations of presbyterian persuasion.

== Congregations in Lesmahagow and the surrounding area involved in the Disruption and history of Abbeygreen ==
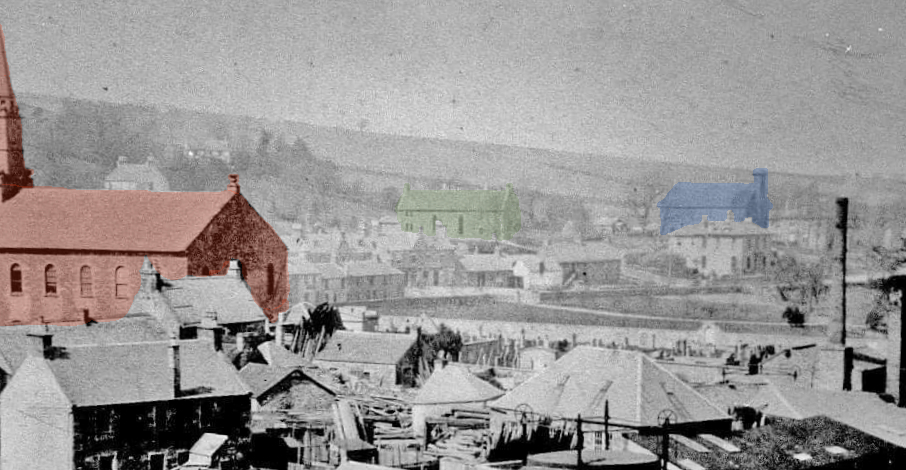
Lesmahagow Churches: Red: Lesmhagow Old Parish Church, Green: The North Church, Blue: Abbeygreen Church. Colourized from photograph taken c.1900.

Lesmahagow Parish was one of only two parishes in the Church of Scotland Presbytery of Lanark which were directly involved in the Disruption, the other being St. Leonard's of Lanark under Rev. Thomas Stark. Other presbyterian congregations in the area became involved in the events around the disruption and in the history of Abbeygreen Church and these are discussed here in their relationships to Abbeygreen prior to the disruption.

This section relates to the churches and congregations directly involved in the history of the formation of Abbeygreen Church as it is today. There are other Christian congregations in Lesmahagow and surrounding area: Notably one of the Scottish Open Brethren, namely the Hope Hall, who meet and worship in the village. Sharing a common understanding of the word of God and the basis for the Christian faith, the Hope Hall and Abbeygreen have a close relationship. Abbeygreen being presbyterian rather than congregational in outlook retains an informal relationship with the Hope Hall for mutual support of the Christian witness in Lesmahagow.

=== Lesmahagow Parish Church of Scotland; At 1842: 1st Charge: Rev. Dr Andrew Boreland Parker & 2nd Charge, Rev. Dr. John Wilson then Rev. Thomas Burns ===
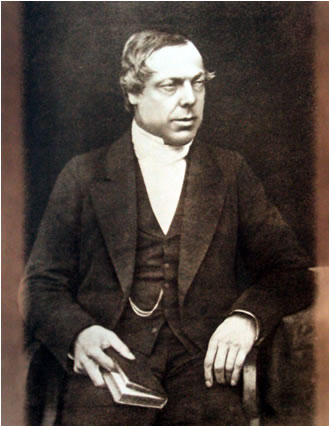
Rev. Dr. Andrew Boreland Parker

The minister of the first charge of the Church of Scotland Parish of Lesmahagow at the time of the Disruption was the Rev. Dr. Andrew Borland Parker. Born in 1810 and licensed to the ministry on 2 October 1833 he came to Lesmahagow from ministering at Levern, Barrhead, near Glasgow until 28 February 1839. Dr. Parker was presented to the congregation by Alexander Hamilton, the 10th Duke of Hamilton on 21 November 1838 and admitted to the first charge of Lesmahagow on 4 April 1839. At this time, Lesmahagow parish of the Church of Scotland was a ministry involving two charges, the first and the second. The minister of the second charge when Dr. Parker arrived in 1839 was the Rev. Dr. John Wilson. Dr. Wilson died in 1842 and was succeeded, in the same year, by the Rev. Thomas Burns who was translated from the High Church in Airdrie. Dr. Parker arrived in the village just prior to the events of 1839 and 1842 which brought the issues relating to patronage so sharply into focus for the people of Lesmahagow.

=== The North Church, Lesmahagow; At 1842: Rev. William Logan ===
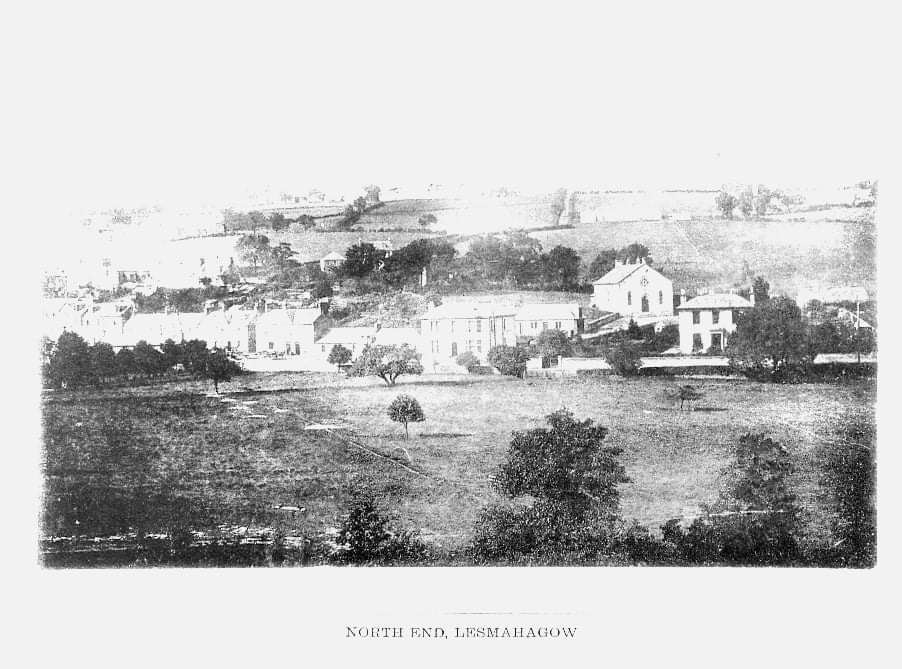
Postcard view of Lesmahagow North End. Looking over the Glebe to St Machutes (centre) and the North Church / Jubilee Hall to the right of centre and slightly up-hill. Postcard pre-dates 1902 as the Parish Church Hall does not exist.

The North Church in Lesmahagow was a congregation of the Secession or Burgher Church (an "Auld Lichts" congregation) which received separate pulpit supply from 1814 and was formed a session on 5 May 1816 from the Original Burgher congregation in Carluke. This formation of a session was to benefit the people of Lesmahagow who worshipped with the Carluke congregation and to allow them to call a minister. The North Church inducted its first minister on 1 March 1820; a newly licensed minister, the Rev. William Logan, born 1789 and licensed to the ministry in January 1819. This branch of the Original Secession church reunited with the Church of Scotland on 11 September 1839 and on that union, a third charge of the Church of Scotland was created in the Lesmahagow Parish.

=== The Reformed Presbyterian Church, Ponfeigh; At 1842: Rev. John Milwain ===
Situated at Ponfeigh, near Douglas Water, was a Reformed Presbyterian Church whose minister was the Rev. John Milwain. This church becomes involved in the history of the formation of Abbeygreen immediately after the Disruption of 1843.

=== St Leonard's Church, Lanark; At 1842: Rev. Thomas Stark ===
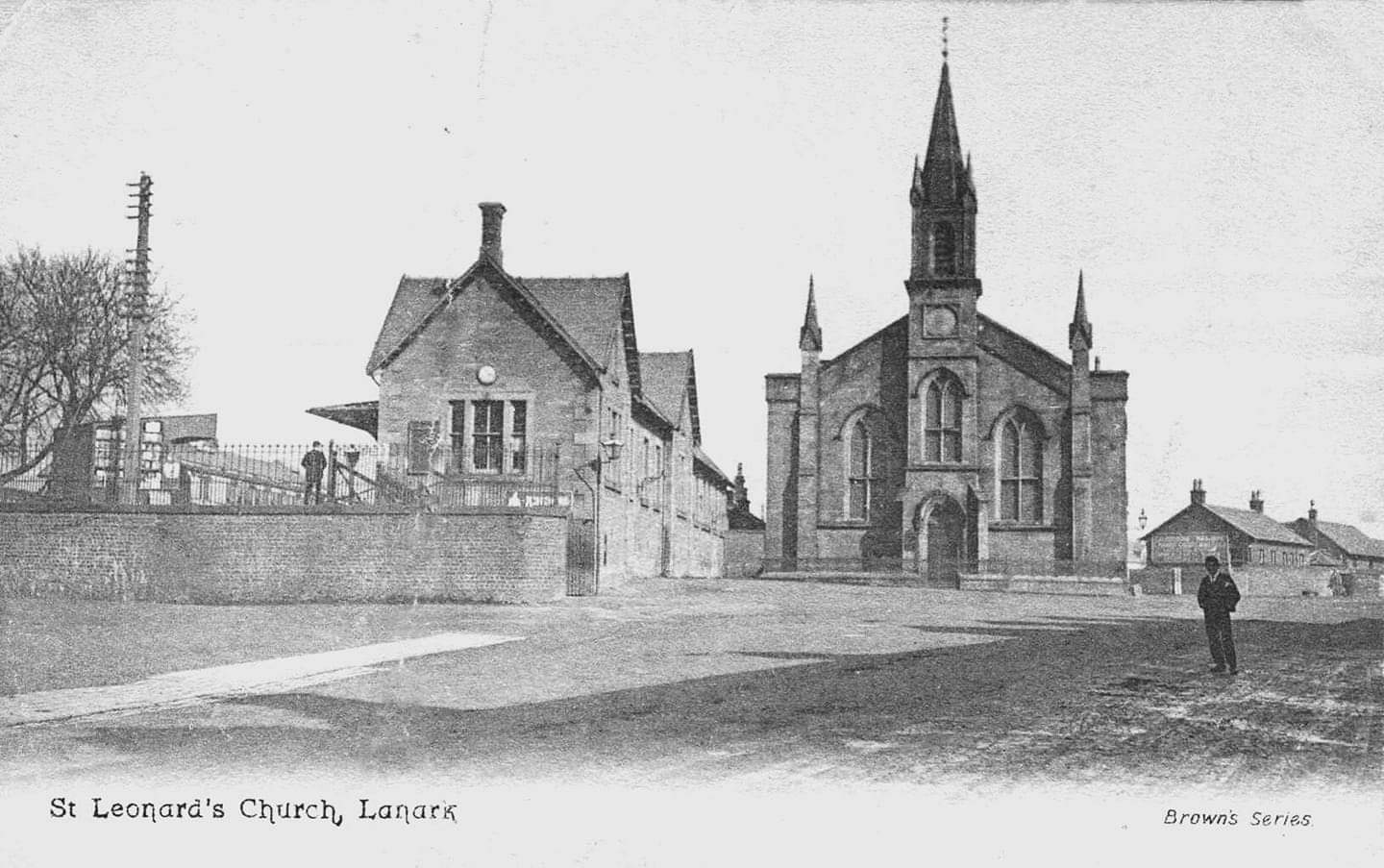
Postcard of Lanark Railway Station & St Leonard's Church c1920

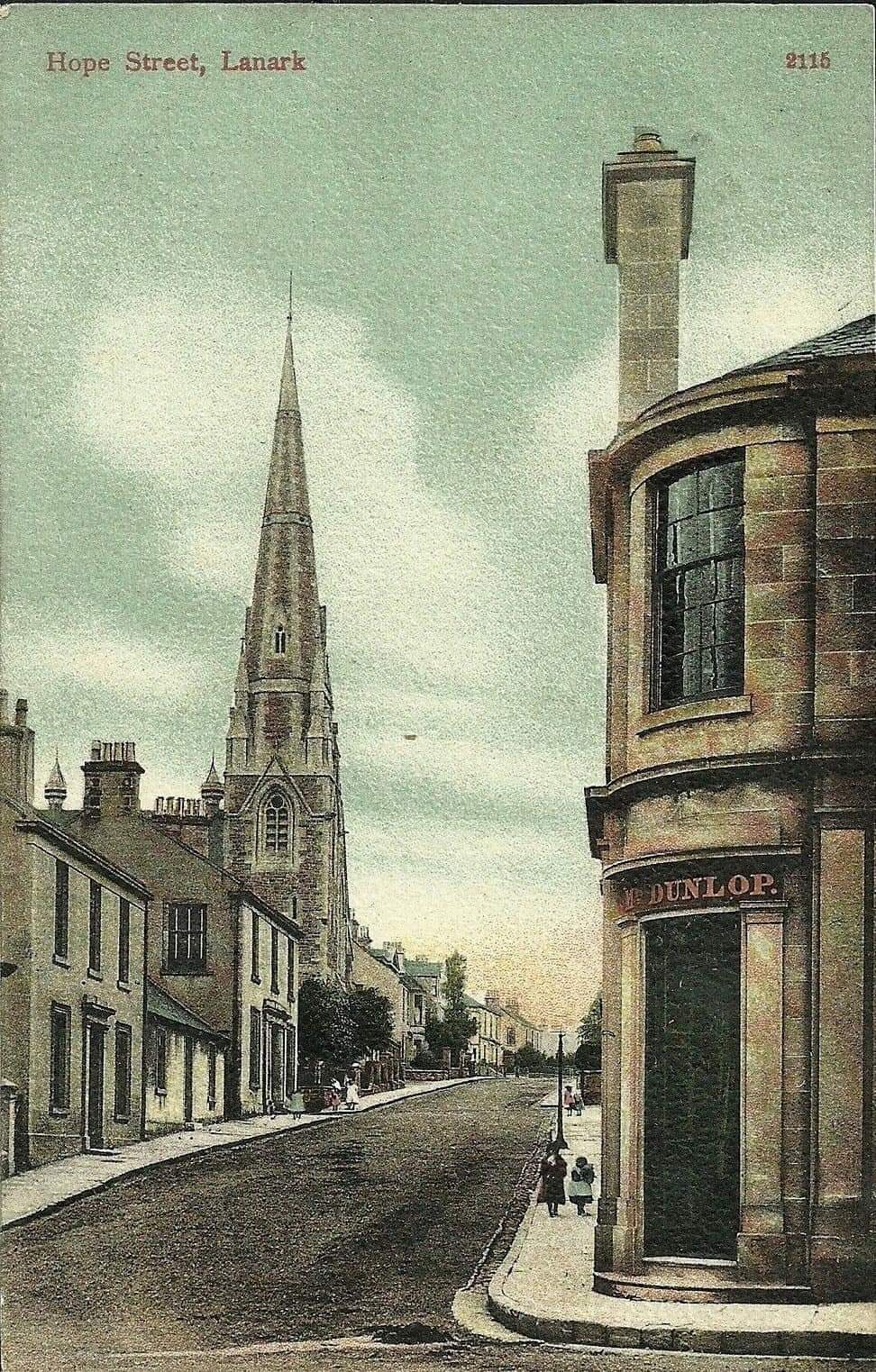
Postcard view of Hope Street Lanark, showing the building which the St Leonard's Free Church congregation bought.

The Church of Scotland congregation at St. Leonard's was constituted on 27 May 1839 and the church was built and opened in 1841 on Bannatyne Street, adjacent to the site of the soon to be Lanark railway station. The church was situated just east of the station entrance and between the station buildings and Bannatyne Street. The station buildings were built in 1855 by the Caledonian Railway. Thomas Stark (b.1803) was ordained as a minister to the congregation on 29 June 1841 and became a minister of the Free Church in 1843. Dispute between the Church of Scotland and the Free Church over the property, led to the building being closed from 1845 to 1851 and the Free Church congregation bought the Associate Burgher church in Hope Street, Lanark and developed it for the needs of the congregation.

=== The Relief Church or "Cordiner" Church ===
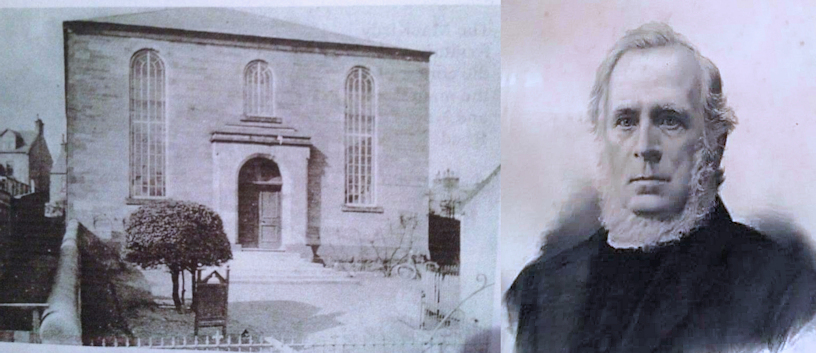
Cordiner Church c.1900 and the Rev. Robert Cordiner

The Cordiner Church was founded as the Lesmahagow Relief Church in 1837 and took its name from its second minister, the Rev. Robert Cordiner, who served it from 1846 until 1897. The Cordiner Church was situated in what is now a housing and flats development named Cordiner Court, between New Trows Road and New Road. The Relief Church dates back to the second secession, of 1761, and in common with the situation of the Societies, the Associate Presbyteries, then Burghers and Anti-Burghers the history of these churches and congregations through the latter part of the 1700s is one where ministry was in short supply. Few of these gatherings were constituted as formal church organizations, with the attendance at preaching events organized in one or other of the branches of the church being attended by adherents from the other branches of this fragmented line of Scottish church organization. Preaching events would be organized in the few buildings owned by the branches, house church meetings, or would often feature open air events, reminiscent of the conventicles of the covenanting times. Presbyteries and Synods of the churches existed but ministers and buildings, being in short supply within each of the branches of the church, led to this situation prevailing through most of the 1700s and early 1800s. The need, in Lesmahagow, for a preaching station of the Relief church came to the notice of the Glasgow Presbytery on 26 July 1836, by Mr M'Lay of Strathaven, and this led to the supply of preachers to meet the needs of the people in Lesmahagow. The congregation was formed on 7 November 1837 and a church was built having 724 seats, although the church was finished early in 1838, it was not opened until August of that year.

Its first minister, Mr Alexander Lindsay was ordained on 22 May 1838. Rev. Lindsay left the charge at the end of 1845 and subsequently joined the Free Church in 1848. Rev. Robert Cordiner was called to the charge in 1846, being ordained on 16 March 1847 and the congregation flourished under his ministry, paying off debt and securing suitable, more modern, manse accommodation for the minister. In 1847, the Relief Church joined with the United Secession Church to form the United Presbyterian Church. Rev. Robert Cordiner retired on 11 October 1894 and was succeeded by Rev. John Lewars on 20 March 1895 who served the congregation until he was released due to a call to another charge on 31 July 1900.

== The Disruption from a local parish church perspective ==
=== 1839 - A refusal of patronage ===
Rev. Dr. Andrew Boreland Parker arrived as minister of the first charge of Lesmahagow in April 1839. As noted in the history of the North Church, the branch of the Original Secession Church to which the North Church belonged merged with the Church of Scotland on 11 September 1839, forming the third charge of the Church of Scotland in Lesmahagow. However, the Duke of Hamilton refused patronage for the incumbent minister of the North Church, the Rev. William Logan. Whatever the reasons for this refusal, it was a clear action against both the minister and the congregation as they were constituted under God. Despite this refusal, the "Burgher" congregation, now part of the Church of Scotland, continued to worship in its own building with the Rev. William Logan as minister. The church building was, what came to be called, the Jubilee Hall on Bloomfield Road in Lesmahagow.

=== 1842 - A second refusal of patronage ===
Now, with the North Church being the third charge of the Church of Scotland in Lesmahagow, the second charge of Lesmahagow became vacant by the Death of the Rev. Dr. John Wilson on 13 February 1842. Rev. William Logan was selected as a candidate for the second charge by winning the vote of the congregation (on 7 July 1842), receiving 293 votes compared to the 205 votes for Rev. Thomas Burns of Airdrie. The Duke of Hamilton gave patronage to and presented the Rev. Thomas Burns to the Lesmahagow Parish Church congregation, contrary to the declared will of that congregation. It is in these circumstances that the Rev. Burns succeeded to the ministry of the second charge on 29 September 1842.

=== 1842 - A congregation's will rejected and a congregation resolved ===
This situation in Lesmahagow was not unusual and represents a typical picture of events in various parts of Scotland where the will of congregations, in their requests to call ministers of their choosing, were overturned by land-owners (or "lay-patrons") supported by both the general assembly and presbyteries of the established church. In 1833, the Church of Scotland General Assembly passed a Veto Act, notionally allowing congregations to assert their right over land-owners but in practice this was meaningless, as the Lesmahagow events show, and the courts of the church were continually dealing with disputes over the appointment of ministers. Therefore, nationally, in the run up to 1843, the issues relating to patronage continued to be contested within the Church of Scotland and positions became ever more entrenched. With the backdrop of all that happened in the churches of the village in 1839 and 1842, a general meeting of the congregation of Lesmahagow Parish Church was called on 28 December 1842 by Dr. Parker. At that meeting, many of the congregation subscribed to support ministers faithful to the Word of God and the independence of the Church of Jesus Christ from state or worldly interference in its spiritual matters. Immediately following the General Assembly of the Church of Scotland, on 28 May 1843, Dr. Parker preached his last sermon in the Parish Church. Intending to begin an exposition in the Book of Exodus, Dr. Parker declared "I can no longer continue in connection with an establishment which has virtually denied the Kingly office of Christ, and submitted its spiritual jurisdiction to the control of Caesar". Dr. Parker, five of the seven elders and eight hundred communicant members left the Church of Scotland and the Parish Church at the formation of the Free Church of Scotland.

=== 1843 and 1844 - The establishment of Lesmahagow Free Church of Scotland - Abbeygreen ===
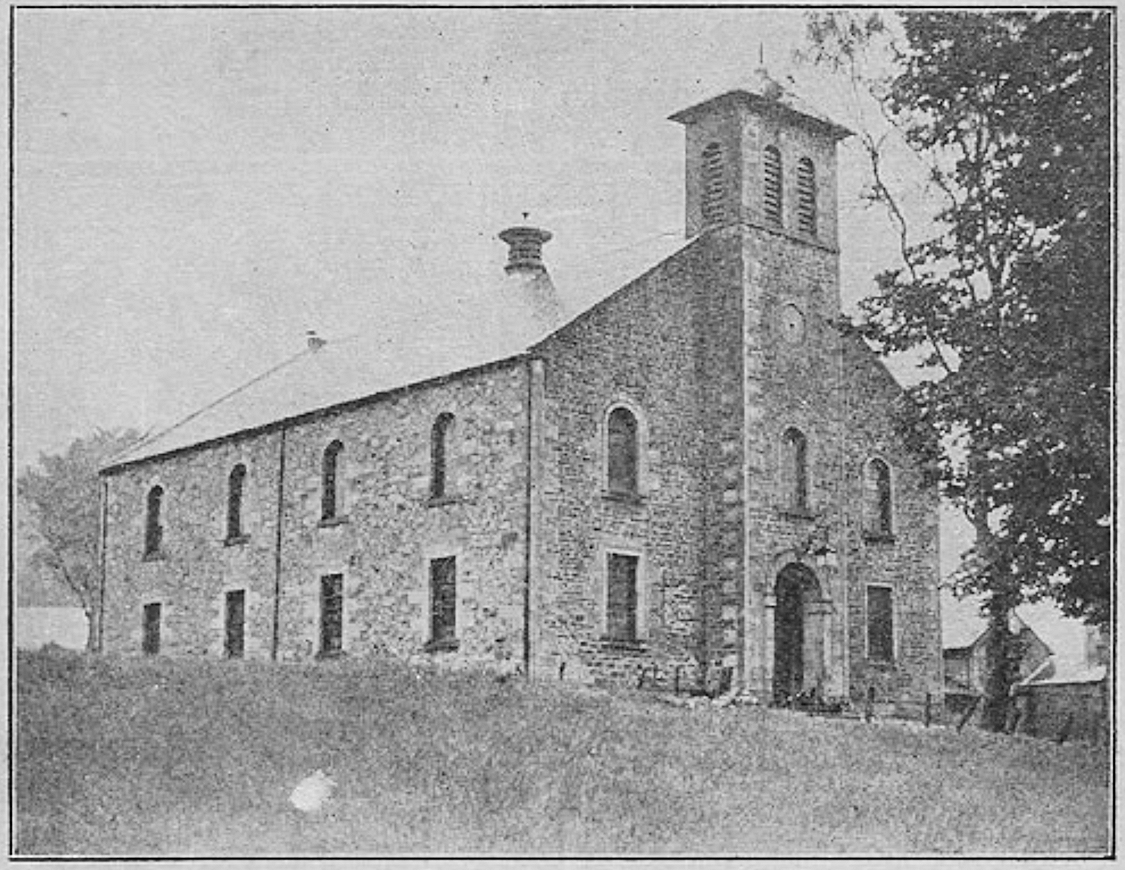
Abbeygreen Church c1900. Church building opened 15 February 1844.

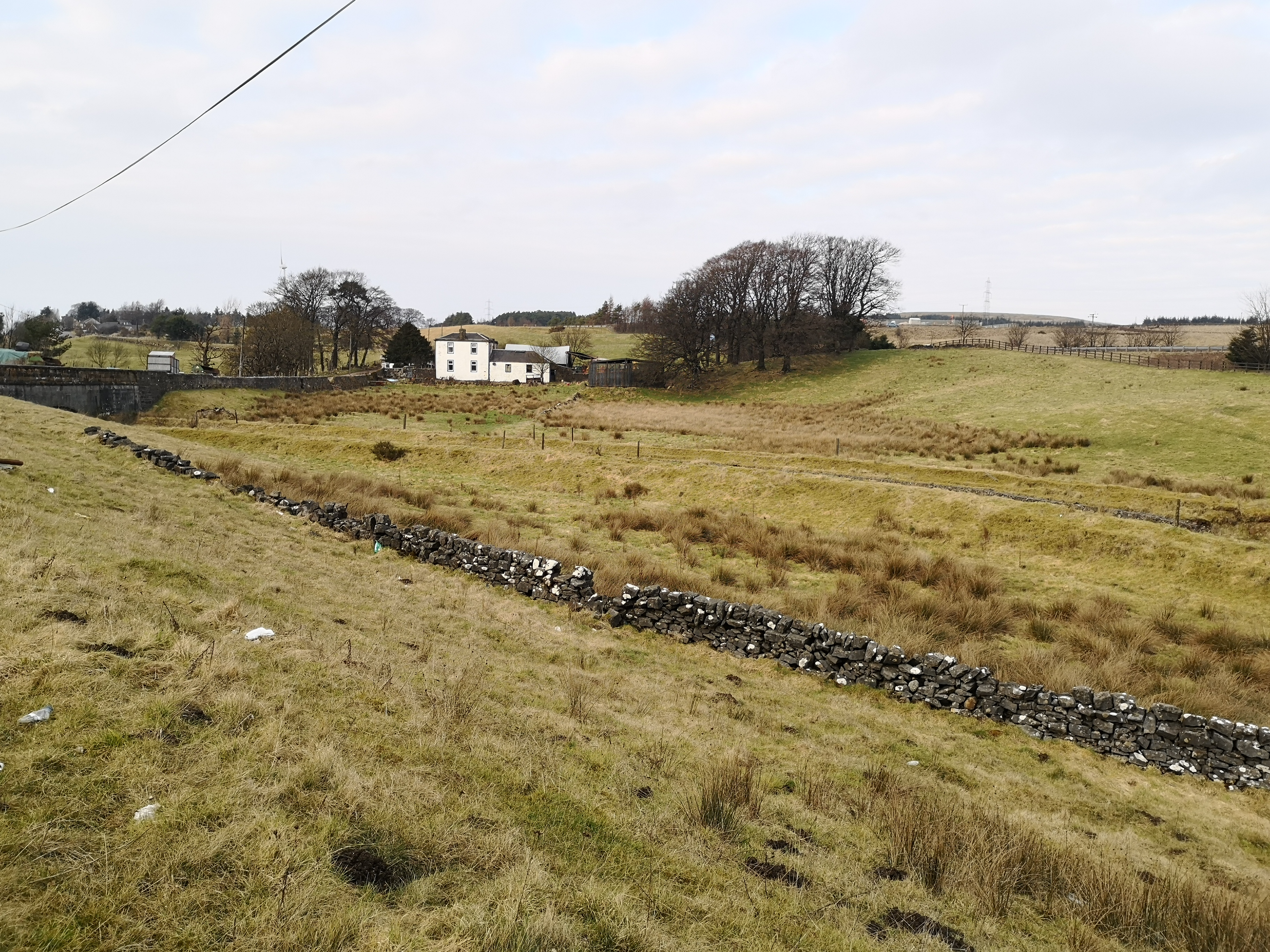
Netherfauldhouse Farm Buildings, 2021

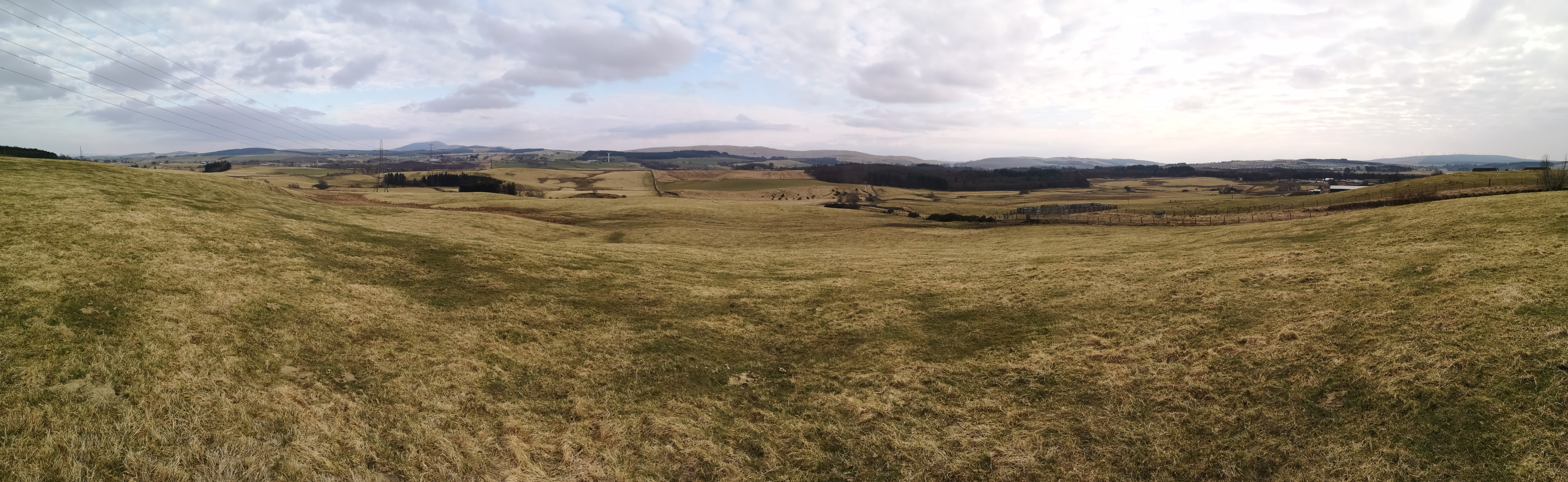
Panorama looking south east over the Muttonhole and Poniel Water, 2021

The new congregation had no property, building or land and faced strong opposition from a number of villagers and local landowners. It is, perhaps, worth noting that this animosity toward the Free Church split from the Church of Scotland could still be found in the attitudes of some people within the village and surrounding area even into the last quarter of the 20th century.

The minister, being homeless, eventually found a house to rent at Netherfauldhouse, about 3.5 miles south east of Lesmahagow. Mr Robert Frame, a surgeon and member of the Parish Church of Lesmahagow, granted the use of a field for the congregation to meet for worship at "the Muttonhole", between Ballieshall farm (or Bellishole) and Folkerton Mill on the Poniel water, some 3.6 miles south east of the centre of Lesmahagow and accessible by roadway from Lesmahagow. Being a good summer, the congregation worshipped in the open air throughout the summer, attracting interest from the people of nearby Douglas, Rigside, Douglas Water and Coalburn, a situation which continued for some time, as open air preaching continued here even after the building of Abbeygreen Church was completed.

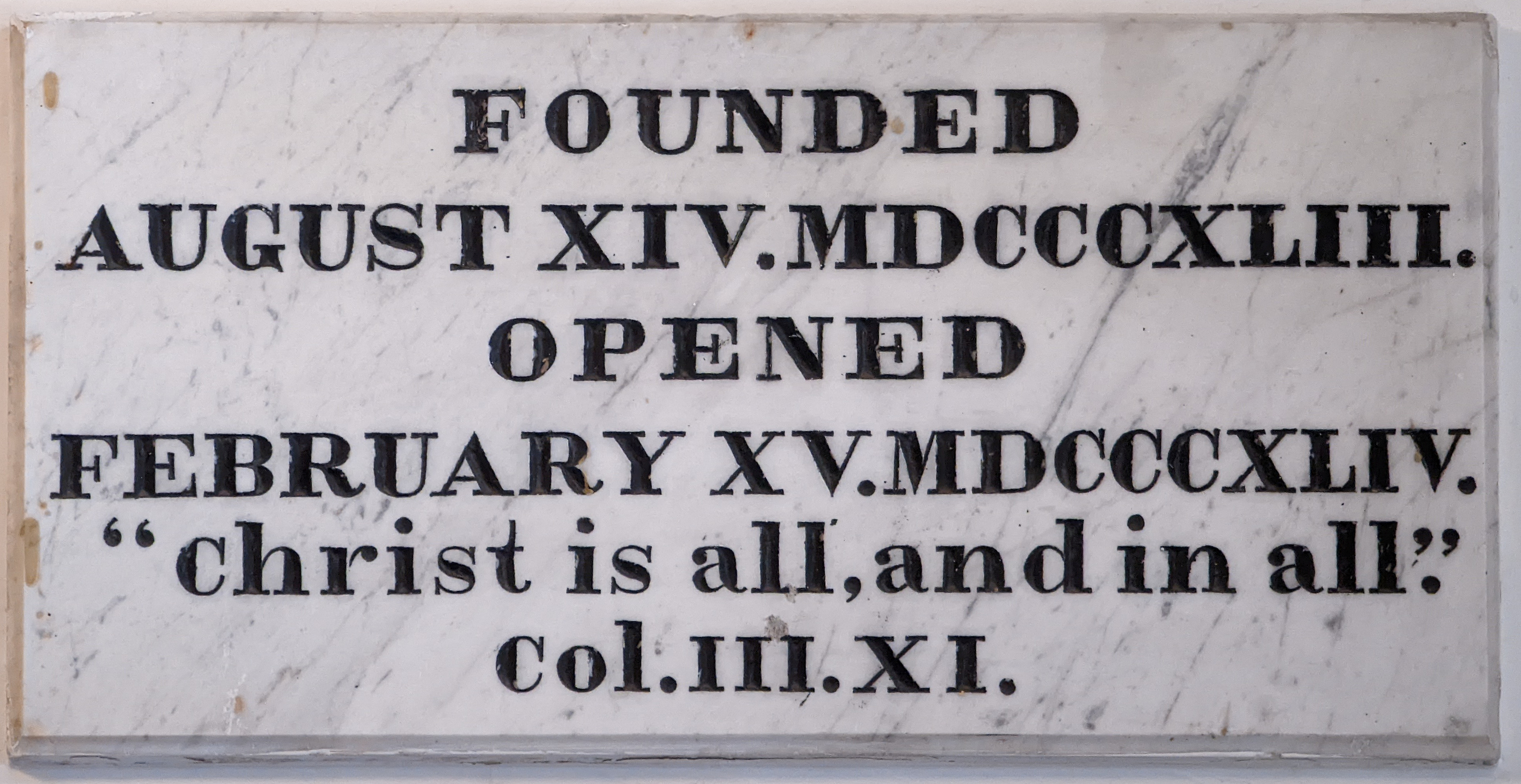
Building Founding Plaque Located in Foyer of Abbeygreen Church

Mr James Brown of Auchlochan negotiated a plot of land, immediately west of the Glebe fields, from the Duke of Hamilton and the foundation stone of a new church building was laid in August 1843. On 15 February 1844, Abbeygreen Free Church was opened to the Glory of God, free of debt and without the aid of the Free Church central fund. The building was designed to a plan provided by the Free Church Building Committee and originally contained 960 sittings provided from just over 370 yards (or 339 meters) of pew seating, not counting standing room.

== Events immediately following the Disruption ==
=== The First Free Church of Scotland Presbytery of Lanark meeting ===
When the disruption took place in 1843, Rev. William Logan and the North Church joined the Free Church of Scotland. Almost immediately on joining the Free Church, the Rev. William Logan received a call to Sanquhar Free Church, and in June 1843, at the first meeting of the Free Church Presbytery of Lanark, decisions were taken; firstly, to unite the North Church and the congregation which came out of the Church of Scotland to prevent there being two charges of the Free Church in Lesmahagow when many parts of Scotland had no provision and secondly, to preach the North Church vacant since the church building was too small for the Free Church membership now in Lesmahagow. That presbytery was constituted by Rev. William Logan (Moderator), Rev. Thomas Stark of Lanark and Rev. Dr. Andrew Boreland Parker and an elder from each congregation.

=== The North Church response to the Presbytery decisions ===
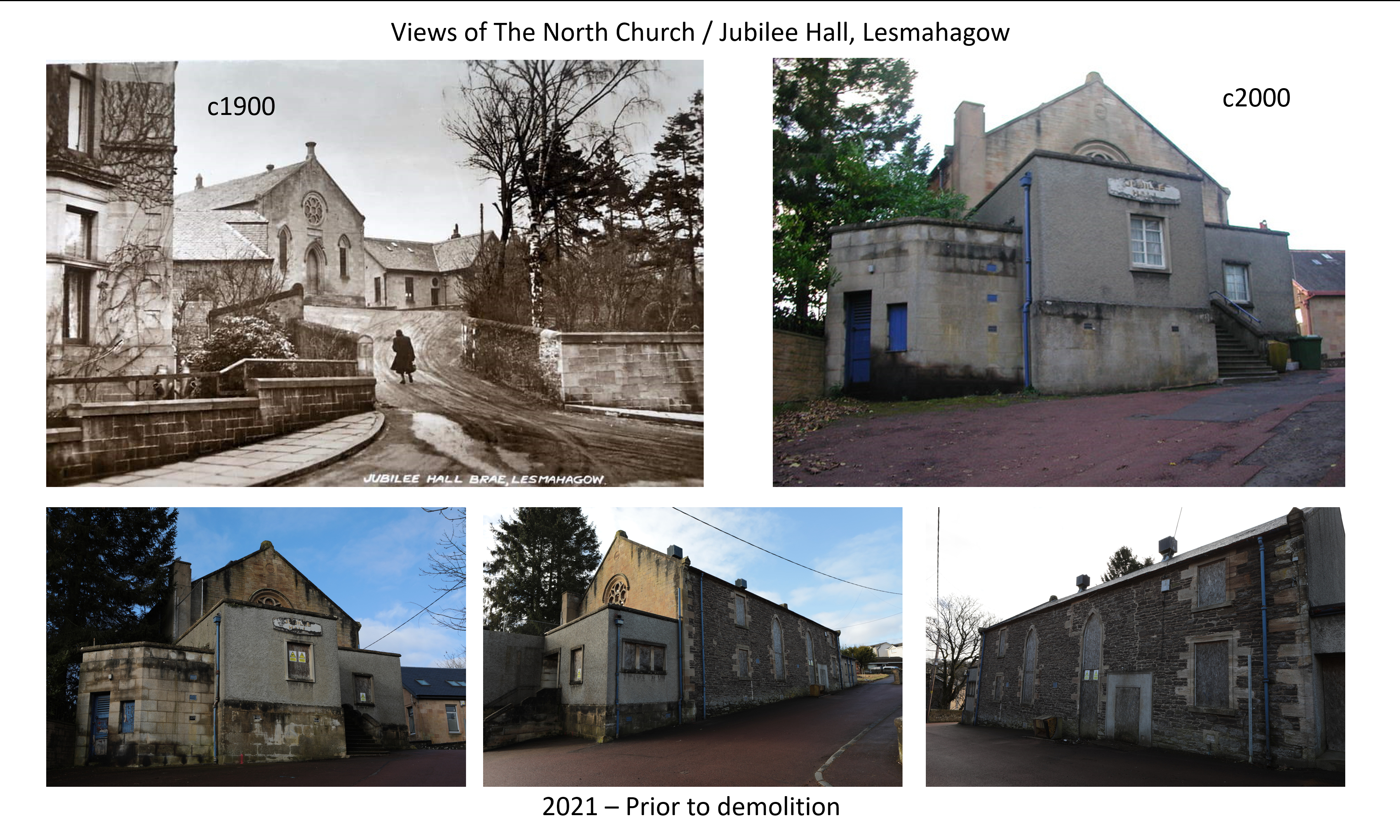
Views of the North Church / Jubilee Hall, Lesmahagow. Recent views show extension work to the front, adding toilet and kitchen facilities, as part of the Jubilee Hall renovations mid 20th century.

Following communication of the decisions of the first Presbytery meeting, the North Church congregation decided to hear the Rev. John Milwain, a preacher from the nearby Reformed Presbyterian Church at Ponfeigh, near Douglas Water, on the Sabbath day (Sunday) the Free Church had chosen to preach it vacant. The North Church session and congregation called Rev. Milwain, and on his acceptance of the call the North Church transferred (both property and congregation) to the Reformed Presbyterian Church with a portion of the congregation choosing to unite with Lesmahagow Free Church. The transfer was completed on 4 March 1844 and the ministry was shared between Ponfeigh and Lesmahagow North Church for a time until moderation was granted on 28 April 1845. On 10 August 1846, Rev. McMeekin (or Macmeeken) was called as minister to the North church and ordained on 30 December 1846. However, due to financial difficulty, the North Church congregation was dissolved in 1869 and therefore did not survive to the time when a majority of the Reformed Presbyterian Church united with the Free Church of Scotland in 1876. Subsequently, the church building was modified and became the village hall, and from 1887, the Jubilee Hall, at the celebration of the Golden Jubilee of Queen Victoria. The building was demolished to make way for a house, which was built in late August 2021.

=== Rev William Logan, Minister of Sanquhar Free Church ===
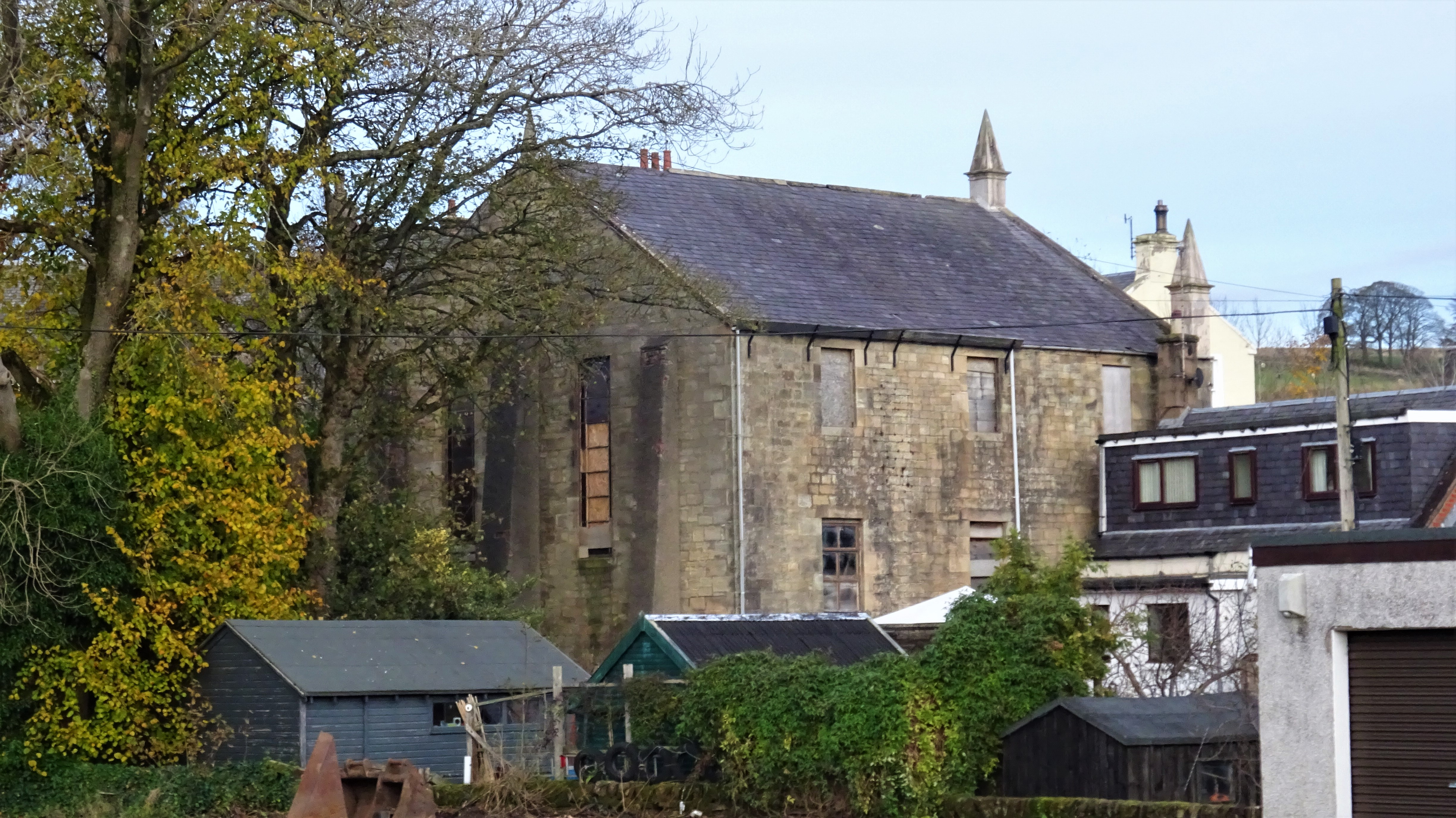
Sanquhar Old Free Church building. Picture dates from 2021.

While it is noted that the minister of Sanquhar Church of Scotland adhered to the protesting party, he did not come out of the Church of Scotland at the Disruption in 1843. There was, however, a "large exodus of his people, who formed a Free Church Congregation". The congregation built a new church building in Sanquhar in 1844, and completed the adjacent manse in 1849. It is this congregation who issued the call to Rev. William Logan to join them as their minister. Rev. Logan accepted the Sanquhar congregation's call and continued as minister of that church until his death on 2 February 1863, having served Christ and His Church as minister for forty five years. It is worth noting that in the reading of the events around the disruption, it is very likely that Rev. Logan's willingness to accept the call to Sanquhar would have been influenced by the need of the new Free Church congregation in Lesmahagow to deal with the local landowner, the Duke of Hamilton, in order to secure lands for the buildings and establishment of the work of the church. It is more than possible that Rev. Logan considered the call from Sanquhar as the providence of the Lord to smooth the way for the new congregation in Lesmahagow.

== Establishing the work of Abbeygreen, Free Church of Scotland ==
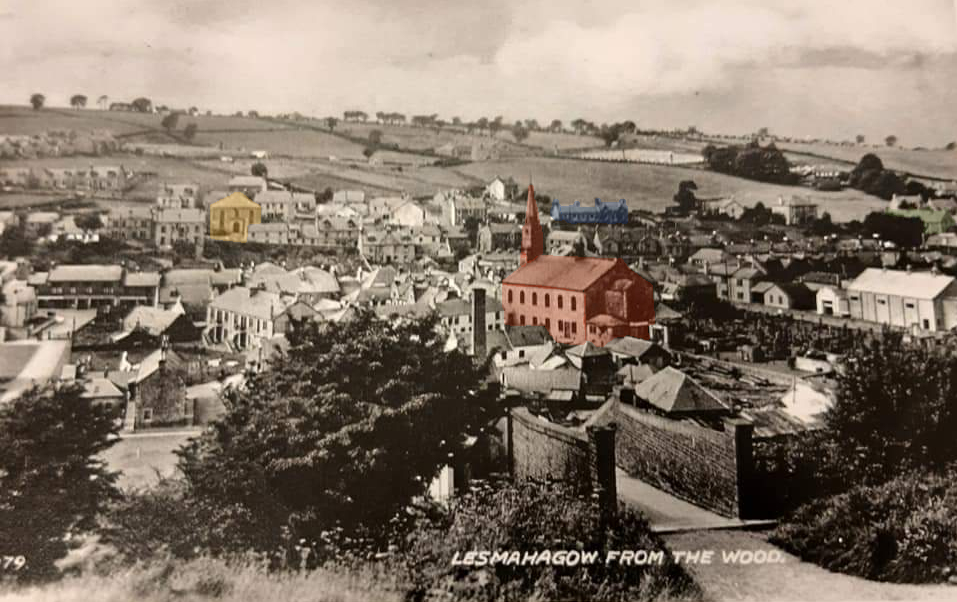
Postcard view of Lesmahagow c1935. Looking over the village, with buildings highlighted: Orange - Cordiner Church, Red - Old Parish Church, Blue - Free Church School on Peasehill, Green - Jubilee Hall (The Old North Church).

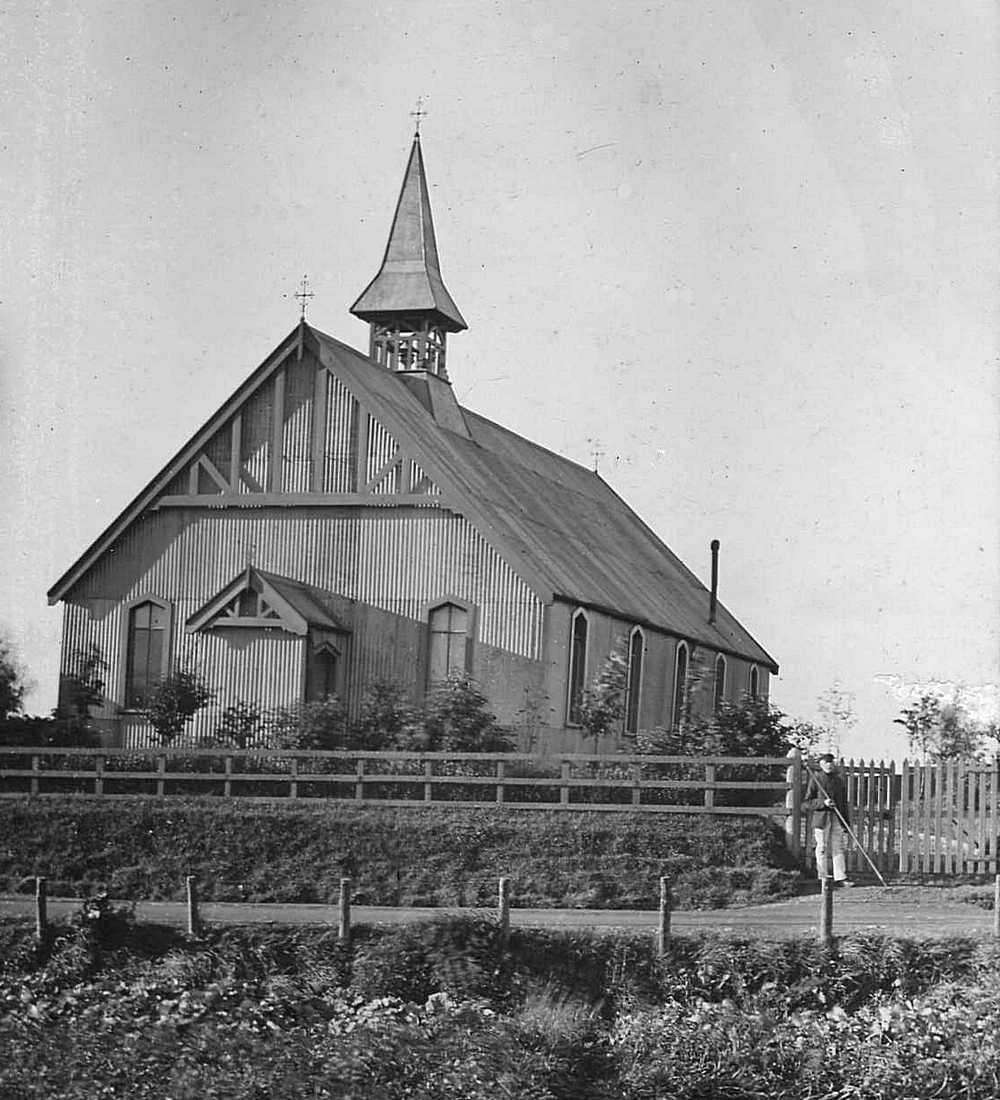
The Original Coalburn Church building. Constructed as a mission station of Abbeygreen Free Church in 1893, becoming an independent Free Church congregation in 1895. The building pictured here was destroyed by fire in 1918. The church was re-built in 1922.

After completion of the building, the congregation of Abbeygreen immediately organized Sabbath day (Sunday) and regular Schools with supporting libraries, and built the church manse later in 1844. A Free Church School was built on Peasehill, Lesmahagow, in 1851. The church also established a number of mission stations in the local area resulting in the planting of a number of congregations which then developed within the Free Church of Scotland. The church in the neighbouring village of Coalburn was one such mission station established in 1893, becoming an independent Free Church congregation in November 1895 with Rev. Peter Walker who ministered there until 1934. Additionally, Free Church congregations were established in the villages of Douglas, (with the church being built in 1845), and Rigside/Douglas Water, (with the church being built in 1886). Each of these resulted, at least in part, from the open air preaching ministry during the summer of 1843 and following.

== Abbeygreen: Free Church ministers until 1900 ==
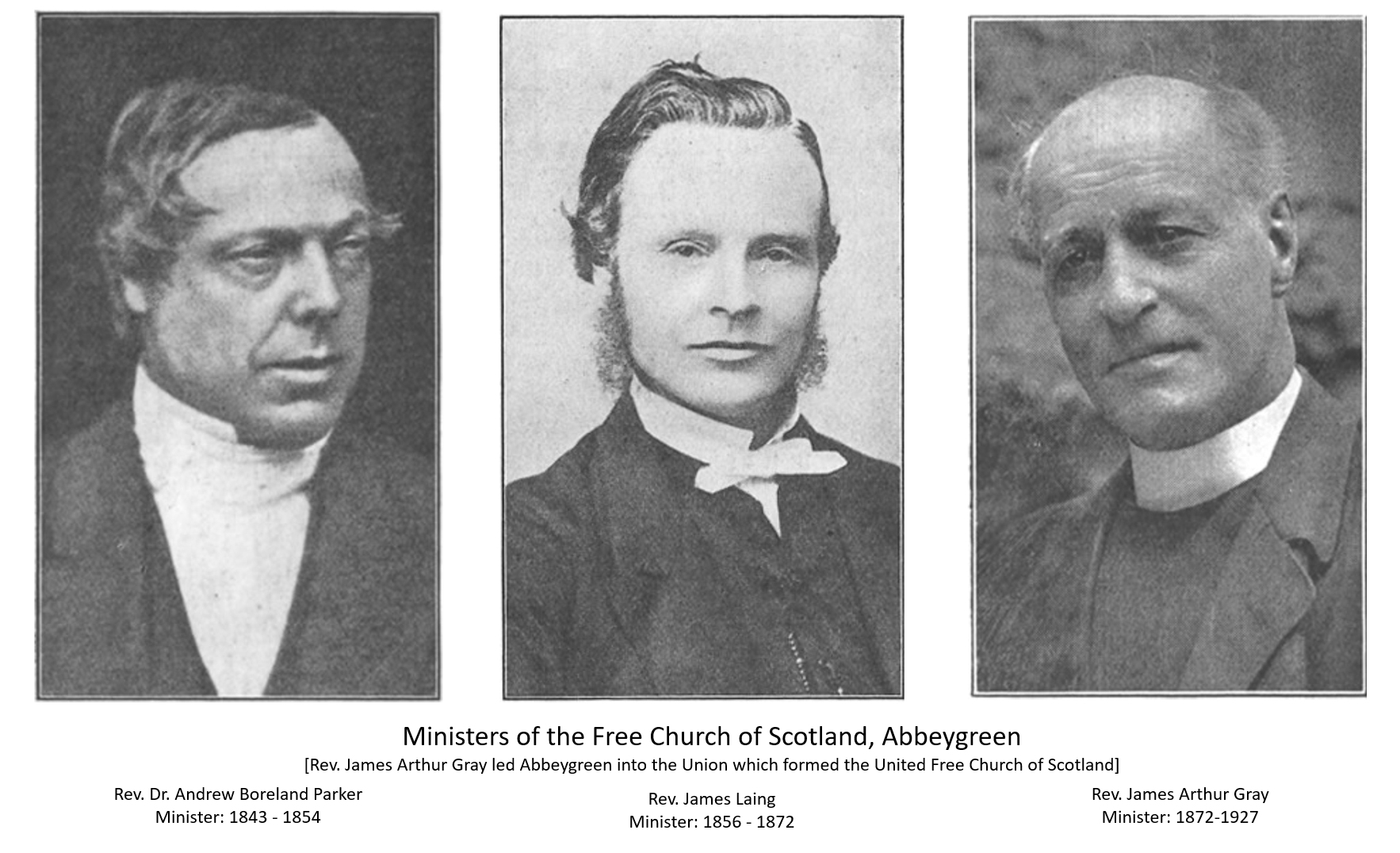
Ministers of Abbeygreen Church 1843 to 1927

Dr. Parker continued as minister of Abbeygreen until 1854 when he was called to the Free Church congregation of Wellpark in Dennistoun, Glasgow. On 16 May 1856 a probationer minister, the Rev. James Laing, was ordained and inducted. Mr Laing continued as the minister in Abbeygreen until 25 February 1872 when he preached his farewell sermon on his translation to Glasgow-West Free Church, thereafter to Bermondsey London and on 26 September 1878, to Stonehouse, Lanarkshire. Rev. Laing's successor, the Rev. James Arthur Gray, b.1843 at Slamannan, was ordained and inducted on 22 November 1872.

== A succession of unions and mergers ==
=== 1900: A majority of the Free Church of Scotland joins the United Presbyterian Church to become the United Free Church of Scotland ===
Abbeygreen became a branch of the United Free Church of Scotland at the joining of a majority of the Free Church and the United Presbyterian Church in 1900. Mr Gray continued as the minister until his retirement in 1927. Then, on 27 October 1927, the Rev. John Walker MA was ordained as minister of Abbeygreen.

=== 1929: A majority of the United Free Church of Scotland joins the Church of Scotland ===
Early in Rev. Walker's ministry, in 1929, the United Free Church reunited with the Church of Scotland. The Church of Scotland having been reconstituted to honour the principles of the Disruption, through the abolishment of patronage, in 1874, and by further Acts of Parliament in 1921 and 1925. The congregation that became Abbeygreen therefore found itself back within the Church of Scotland as the congregation of Lesmahagow-Abbeygreen on 2 October 1929. The joining of a majority of the United Free Church of Scotland with the Church of Scotland also brought the Cordiner church into the Church of Scotland, leading to three separate congregations of the Church of Scotland in the Parish of Lesmahagow. Mr Walker's ministry ended in May 1939 and he was followed by the Rev. T.F. Neill. Mr Neill was ordained on 25 January 1940.

=== 1940: Union with the Cordiner Church: A change of constitution for Abbeygreen ===
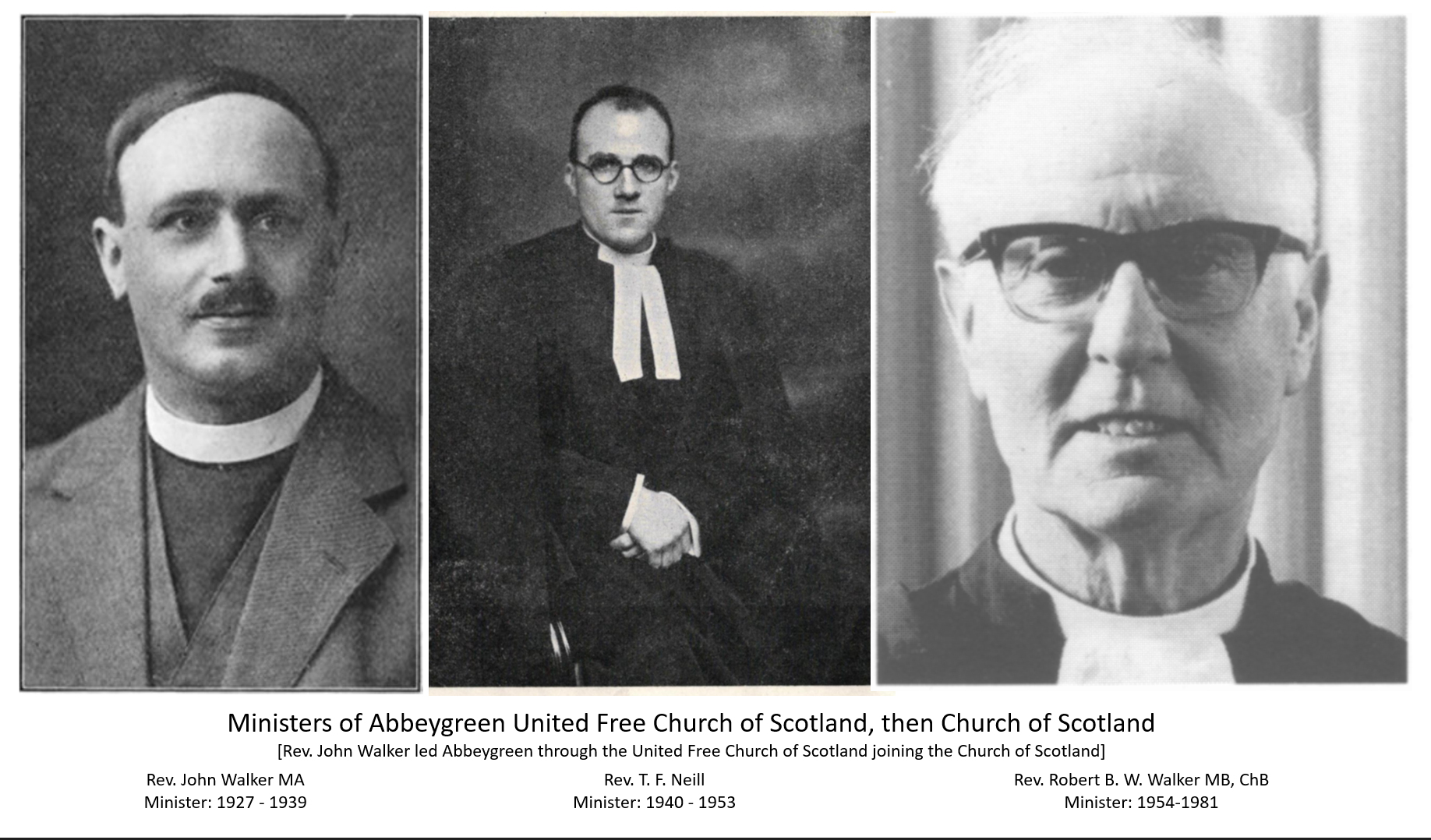
Ministers of Abbeygreen Church 1927 to 1981

The Relief Church, of which the Cordiner Church in Lesmahagow was part, joined the United Secession Church in 1847 as part of the formation of the United Presbyterian Church. Then, in 1900, the United Presbyterian Church joined with a majority of the Free Church of Scotland (1843-1900) to form the United Free Church of Scotland. At this event, Abbeygreen and the Cordiner Church found themselves in the same church denomination, while remaining separate congregations. Then, in 1929, Abbegreen Church and the Cordiner Church followed the majority of the United Free Church of Scotland into the Church of Scotland at the union of the United Free Church of Scotland with the Church of Scotland. The individual congregations respectively became the charges of Lesmahagow-Abbeygreen and Lesmahagow-Cordiner Church along with Lesmahagow Old Parish Church. Three churches of the same denomination in one village.

The minister of the Cordiner church at this time was Mr Morton, and in 1940 he became seriously ill. Abbeygreen Church and the Cordiner Church enjoyed a long and mutually supportive relationship and so, with the illness of Rev. Morton, the members of the Cordiner church were invited to temporarily join with Abbeygreen in worship. In June 1941 members of the Cordiner Church met with the congregation of Abbeygreen to discuss union of the two churches and in July 1941, the two churches united. The sessions united and a congregational board was formed, with the last meeting of the old Deacons Court of Abbeygreen taking place on 1 July 1941. This action created Lesmahagow-Abbeygreen, Church of Scotland, under the "Model Deed of Constitution"; a constitution designed to separate the temporal affairs of the church, managed by church members elected to the "Congregational Board" working alongside the ordained elders, from the spiritual affairs of the church which are led by the ordained elders acting as the Kirk Session. The first meeting of the final constitution of Lesmahagow-Abbeygreen Church of Scotland, the session and congregational board, took place on 7 July 1941.

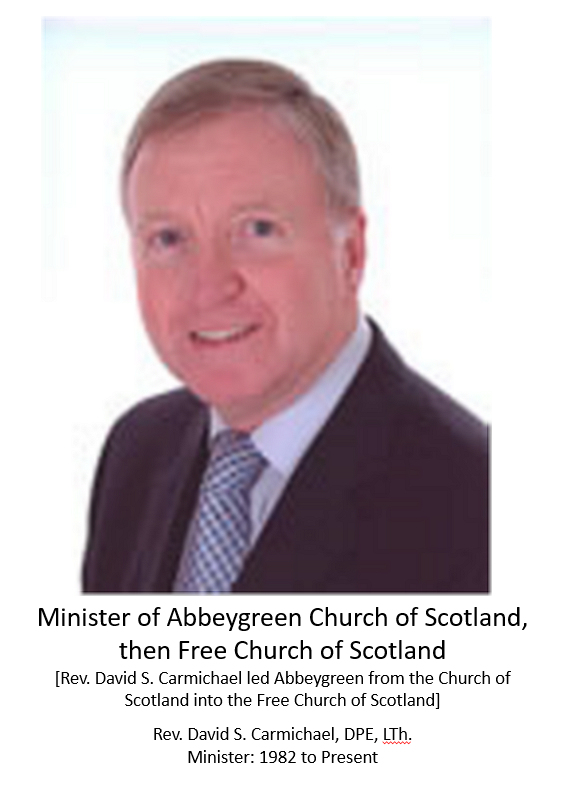
Minister of Abbeygreen Church from 1982

On Abbeygreen rejoining the Free Church of Scotland in 2020, there were still two members of the congregation who were members of the Cordiner Church Sunday School; both having served as office bearers to Abbeygreen Church for some considerable time; Mr Jim Brown and Mrs Nancy Lang.

=== 1941 to 2020: Ministry within the Church of Scotland ===
From the union with the Cordiner Church congregation, the Rev. T.F. Neill served the church until 1953 when he was called to Cranhill in Glasgow. On 6 April 1954, the Rev. Dr. Robert B.W. Walker MB, ChB was inducted as minister of Abbeygreen. Dr. Walker continued in the ministry until ill health forced him to demit his charge at the end of October 1981. Following a period of vacancy, a probationer minister, the Rev. David S. Carmichael, was ordained and inducted on 2 September 1982, where he served the Lord and his people until his retirement on 29 January 2023.

== Return to the Free Church of Scotland ==
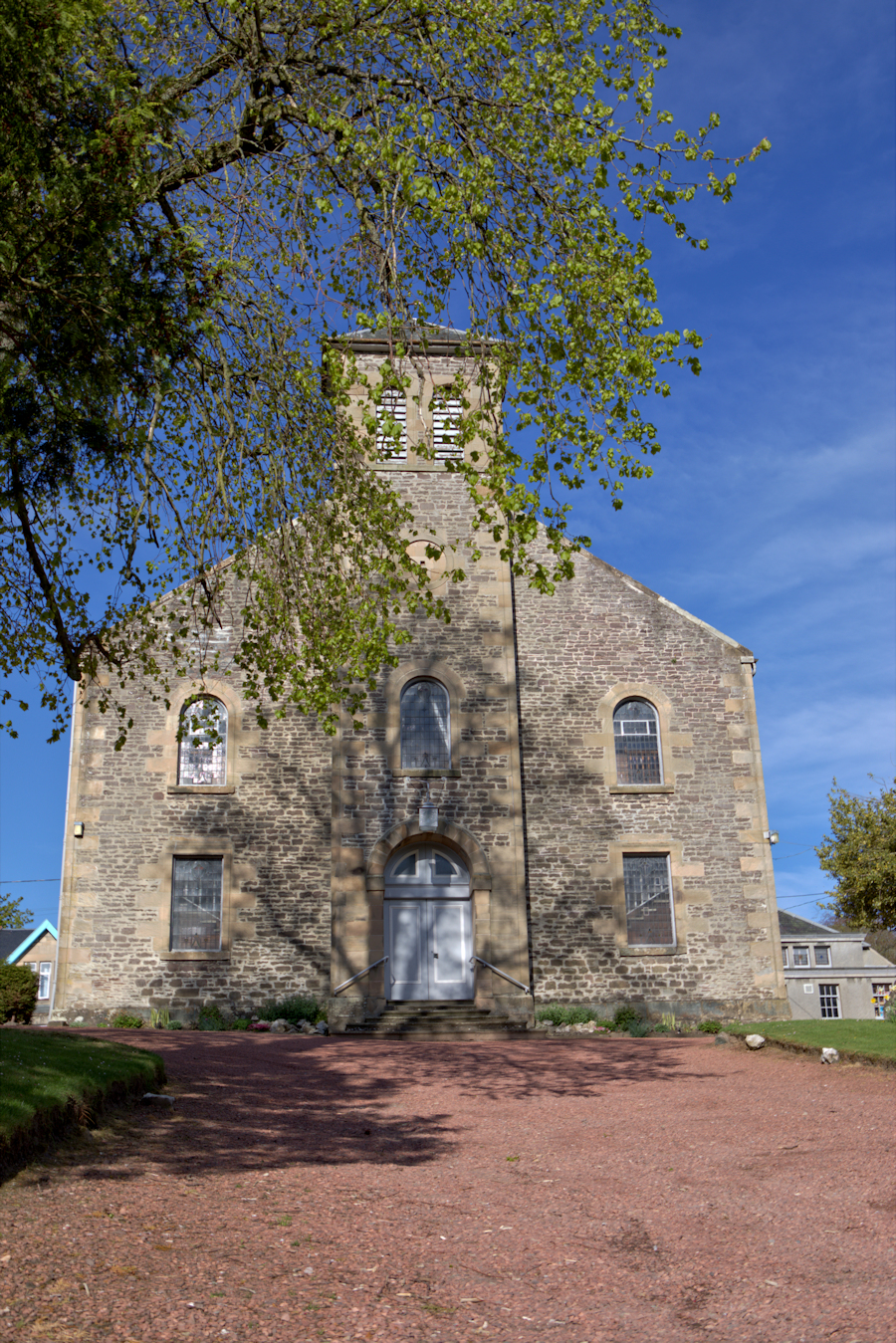
Abbeygreen Church, Lesmahagow

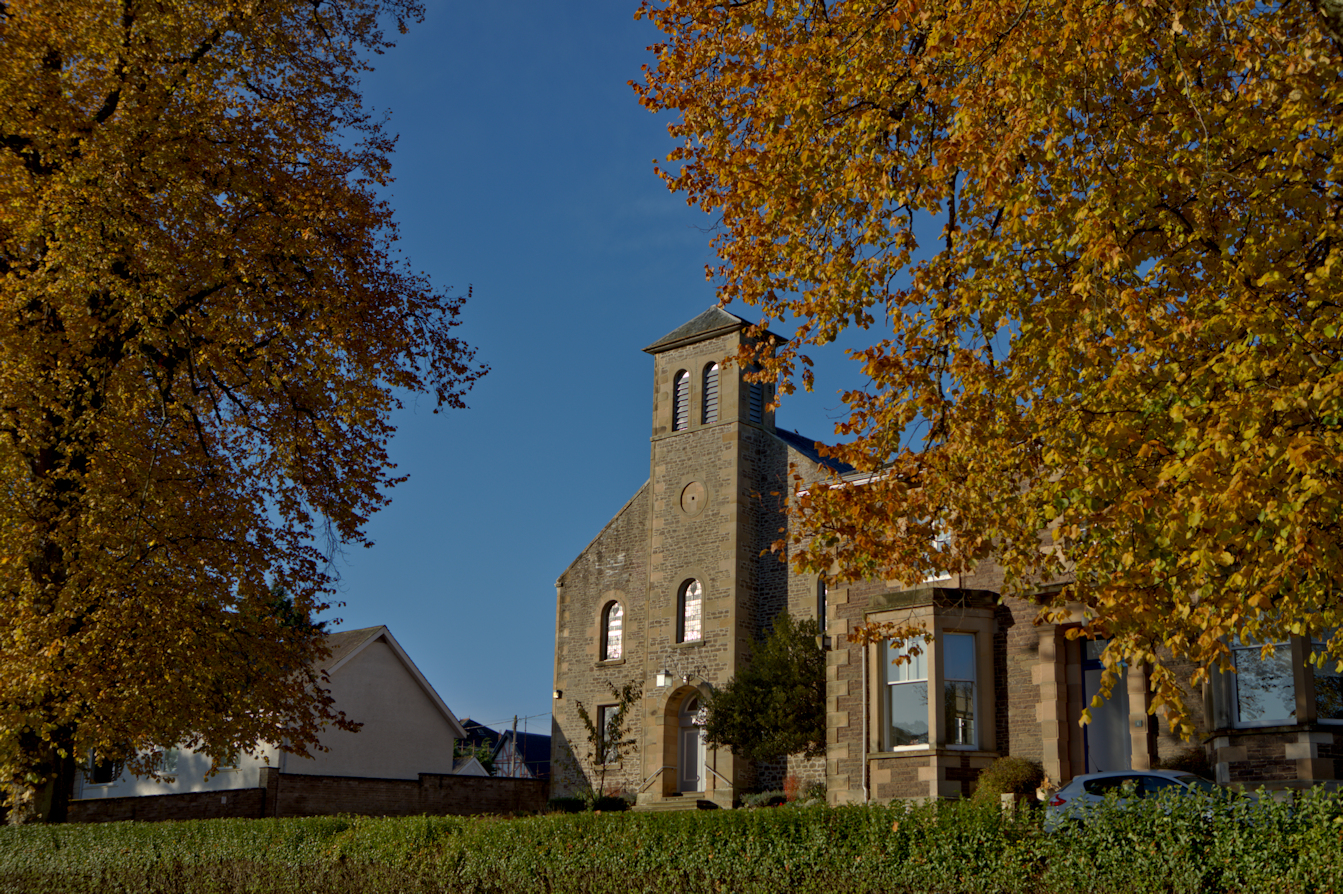
Abbeygreen Church and Manse from Abbeygreen

On 26 March 2020, the congregation of Abbeygreen Church, in unity with its elders and minister left the Church of Scotland to form Abbeygreen New Church, meeting once as an independent congregation on 29 March (online). The church had worked with the Church of Scotland, Presbytery of Lanark, to secure its land and buildings and completed the transfer on the morning of 26 March, immediately before the legal system in Scotland was shut down by the government on the afternoon of 26 March due to the COVID-19 situation. On 31 March 2020, the minister was accepted and recognized as a minister of the Free Church of Scotland and the congregation of Abbeygreen was joyfully re-admitted into the Free Church of Scotland, where it began in 1843. The meeting of the church "online" on 29 March 2020 was a feature of the Sars-CoV-2 virus situation which resulted in public gatherings being closed down by the Scottish Government from the afternoon of 26 March in the UK. The church is constituted within the Free Church of Scotland under the Model Trust Deed constitution, that of having a Kirk Session and a Finance Committee and serves as part of the Free Church of Scotland Presbytery of Glasgow. The heritable properties and capital assets of the church are held by a charitable limited company; Abbeygreen Ministries Trust.

== Commencement of a New Ministry in the Free Church of Scotland ==
After the retirement of Rev. Carmichael, the congregation spent a period of time seeking a new minister. Rev. Colin J. Fast, who had come to Scotland in 2023 to work with Christian Focus Publications, came to their attention with a view to calling him to be their minister. In the second half of 2025 the interim moderator for Abbeygreen made approach for Rev. Fast to be accepted as a Minister of the Free Church of Scotland and at the General Assembly in May 2026, Rev. Fast was accepted as a minister of the Free Church, allowing the congregation to proceed with the call. The Presbytery of Glasgow and Argyll moderated the call of Rev. Fast on 1 June 2026 ahead of the regular Presbytery meeting of 2 June 2026 at which the call was accepted, setting the date for induction of Rev. Fast to the charge of Abbeygreen for 19 June 2026. On 19 June 2026 Rev. Colin J. Fast was inducted as the minister of the congregation of Abbeygreen Free Church of Scotland by the Presbytery of Glasgow and Argyll.

== Timeline of ministers and major events of Abbeygreen Church ==
=== Major events in the life of Abbeygreen Church ===
Table of major events in the life of Abbeygreen Church
Year(s)	Name of minister	Event	Date of event (if relevant/known)
2026	Rev. Colin J. Fast	Minister inducted by the Presbytery of Glasgow & Argyll	19/06/2026
2023	Rev. David S. Carmichael	Minister Retires	29/01/2023
2020	Rev. David S. Carmichael	Minister and congregation of Abbeygreen accepted into the Free Church of Scotland	31/3/2020
2020	Rev. David S. Carmichael	Abbeygreen Leaves Church of Scotland & becomes Abbeygreen New Church	26/3/2020
1982	Rev. David S. Carmichael	Minister ordained & inducted	2/9/1982
1981	Rev. Dr. Robert B.W. Walker	Minister demits due to ill health	30/10/1981
1954	Rev. Dr. Robert B.W. Walker	Minister inducted	6/4/1954
1953	Rev. T. F. Neill	Minister called to Cranhill, Glasgow	
1941	Rev. T. F. Neill	Abbeygreen and Cordiner Church Unite, Abbeygreen reconstituted to "Model Deed of Constitution"	7/7/1941
1941	Rev. T. F. Neill	Last Deacons' Court meeting of Abbeygreen Church	1/7/1941
1940	Rev. T. F. Neill	Minister inducted	25/1/1940
1939	Rev. John Walker	Minister leaves	1/5/1939
1929	Rev. John Walker	Abbeygreen joins the Church of Scotland along with the majority of the United Free Church of Scotland	2/10/1929
1927	Rev. John Walker	Minister inducted	27/10/1927
1927	Rev. James Arthur Gray	Minister Retires	
1900	Rev. James Arthur Gray	Abbeygreen joins the United Presbyterian Church along with the majority of the Free Church of Scotland at the formation of the United Free Church of Scotland	
1872	Rev. James Arthur Gray	Minister Inducted	22/11/1872
1872	Rev. James Laing	Minister translated to West Congregation, Free Church of Scotland, Glasgow	25/2/1872
1856	Rev. James Laing	Minister ordained & induced	16/5/1856
1855	N/A	Vacant	
1854	Rev. Dr. Andrew Boreland Parker	Dr Parker Called to Wellpark Free Church, Dennistoun, Glasgow	
1844	Rev. Dr. Andrew Borland Parker	Church Building opened	15/2/1844
1843	Rev. Dr. Andrew Borland Parker	Leaving Church of Scotland	28/5/1843
1842	Rev. Dr. Andrew Borland Parker	General Meeting of Lesmahagow Congregation	28/12/1842

=== Major events related to the upkeep of the buildings and fabric of Abbeygreen Church ===
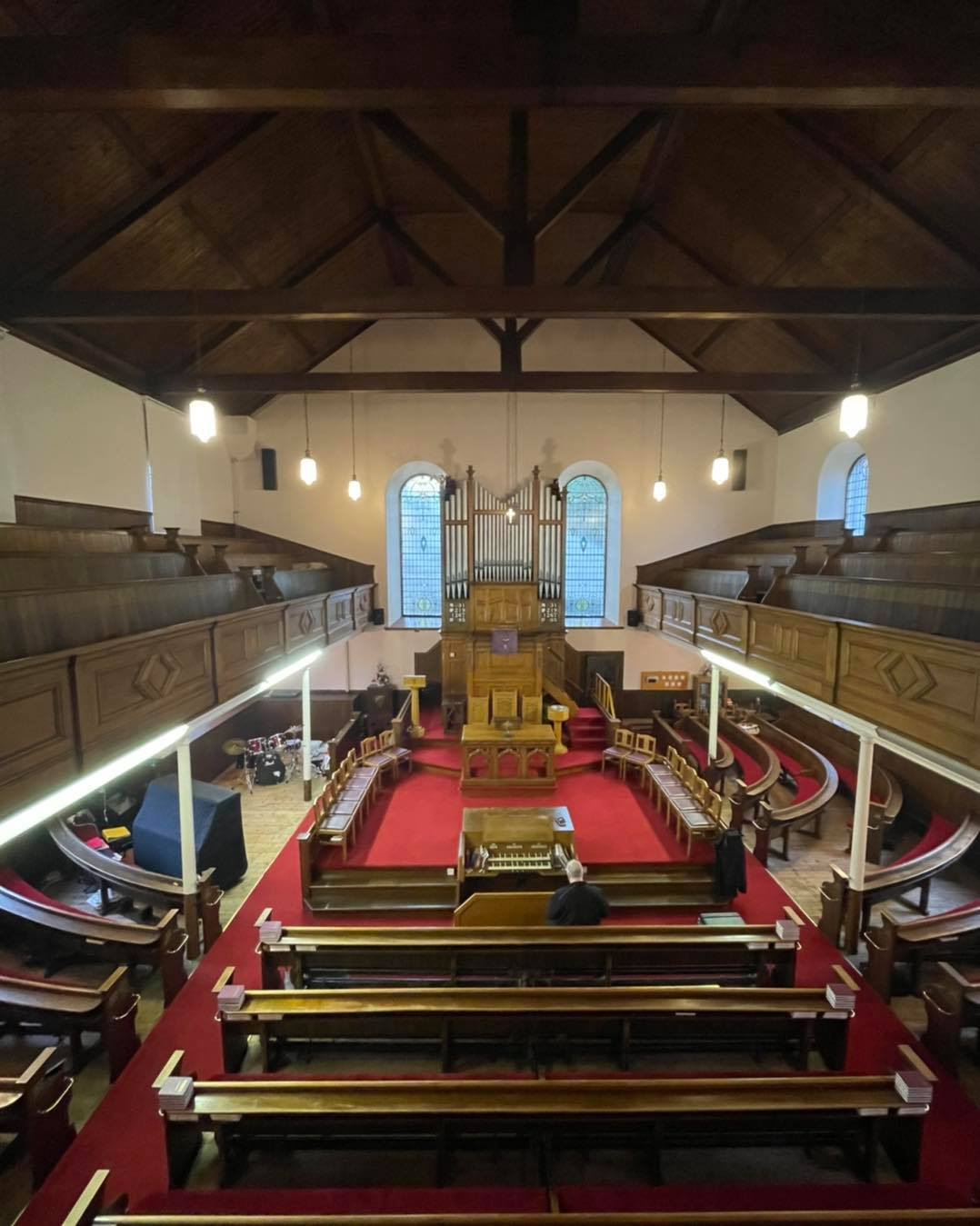
Photograph of the interior of Abbeygreen Church taken in October 2021 during organ maintenance.

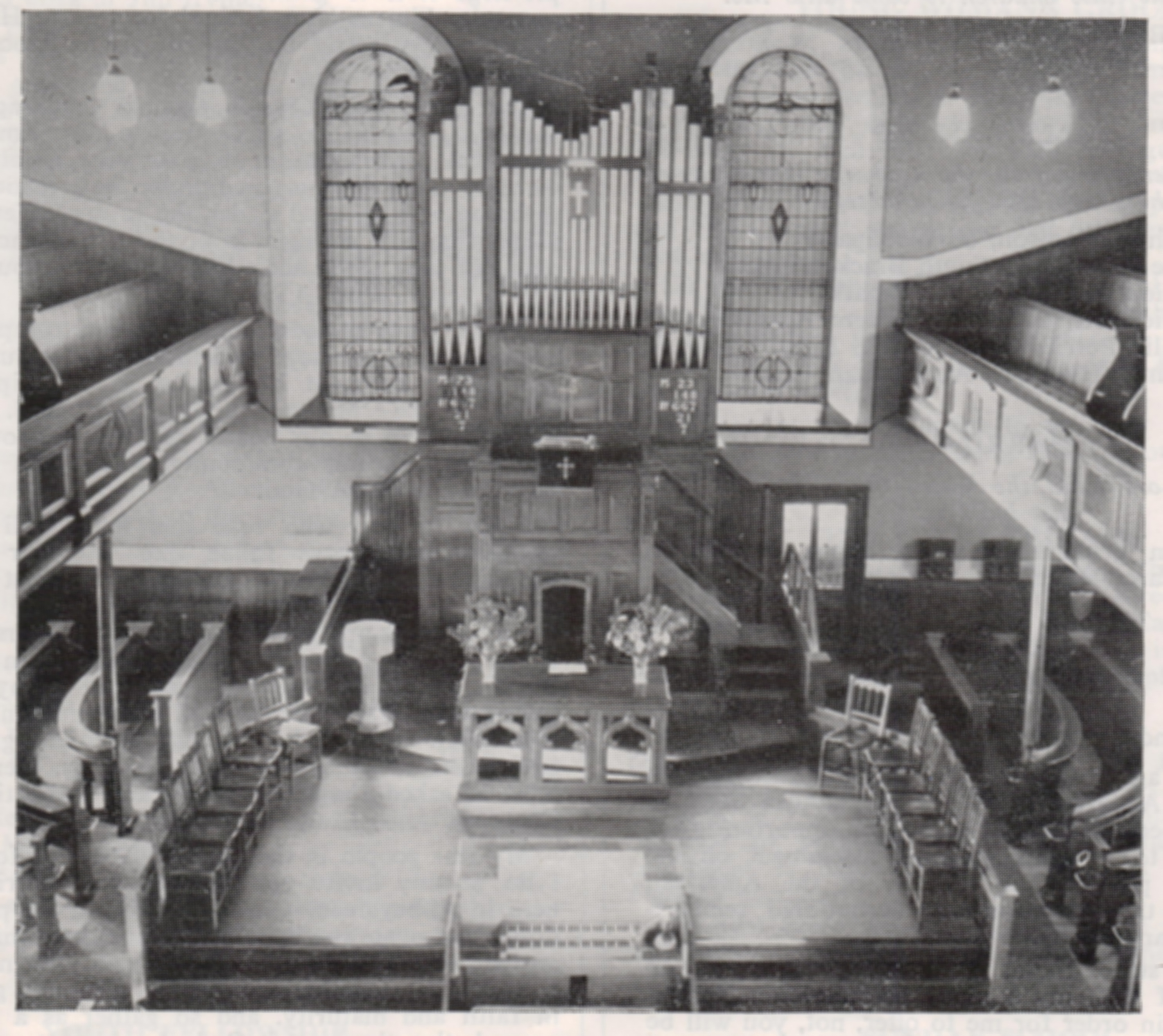
Photograph of the interior of Abbeygreen Church after renovations in 1955. Showing re-arrangement of the chancel area and the position of the organ keyboard after the move.

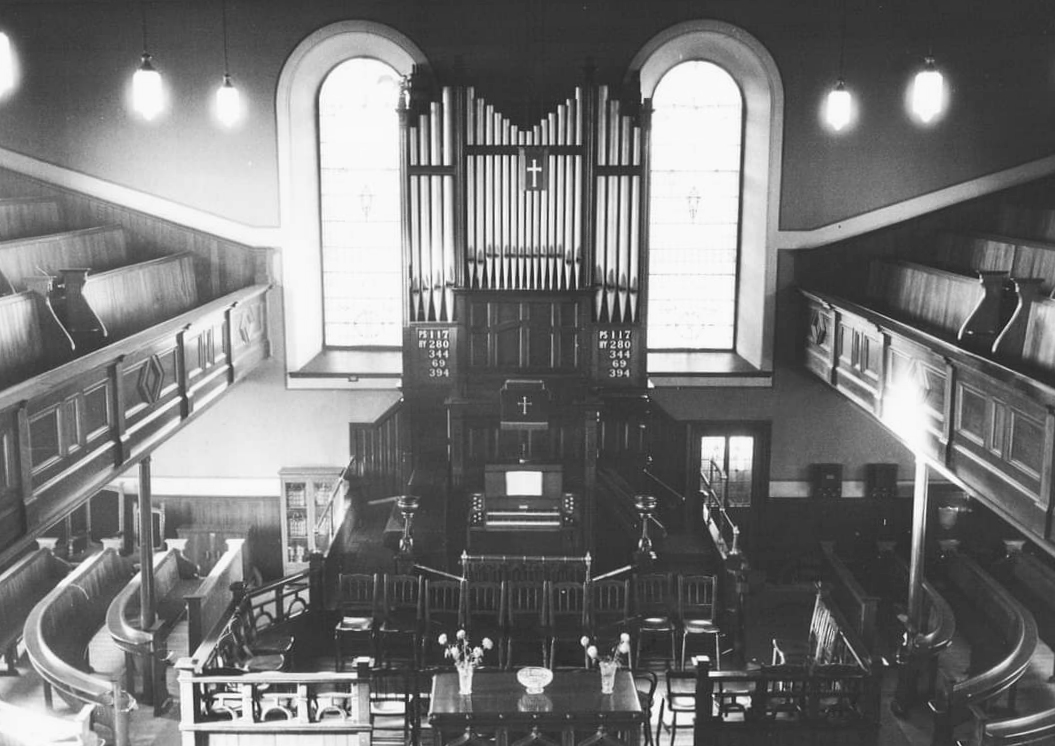
Photograph of the interior of Abbeygreen Church after renovations in 1936, but prior to organ move in 1955.

Table of events related to the upkeep of buildings and fabric of Abbeygreen Church
Year	Event	Notes
2020	Redecoration of the Church Halls	The young folk of the church took part in a project which saw the complete re-decoration of the church halls.
2013	Stage Lighting System Provision	In 2013 a lighting system was purchased to allow lighting effects to be used to enhance the events of the church, mainly to support the activity of The Summer Club, but also for Sunday School and Youth Fellowship productions.
2009	Hall Sound System and Loop Installation	A loop system (for hearing aid use) was provided in the church hall along with a sound mixing system which enabled various inputs to be included and to allow digital recording of sermons, bible studies and talks given in the church hall.
2007 & 2008	Sound System Overhaul and Upgrade	A new sound system, incorporating the speakers and loop system installed in 1993, was fitted to the main church building. This provided improved digital recording and audio mixing control as well as improved provision for sound input from what became the band area. Additional speakers were provided and a mixing capability which enabled efficient running of the morning and evening worship sound re-enforcement, the events of the church and particularly the Sunday School and Youth Fellowship productions and the Summer Club activity.
2005	Church Hall Extension Built	An extension and renovation to the church halls were planned through 2004 and began after the renovation of the church hall following the fire. These renovations consisted of re-structuring the vestry to provide an additional meeting room, addition of a separate meeting room to be used primarily for Sunday morning Creche facilities and provision of an upgraded toilet block and provision of wheelchair access and toilet facilities. These works were completed and opened on 18 December 2005.
2003	Renovations After Fire Damage to Church Hall	After a fire at the church hall entrance (9 May 2003), the church hall, kitchen and underfloor areas were completely renovated. During the renovations, all church events were held in the church building, with the Jubilee hall being reserved, and used in certain circumstances (Youth Club and Summer Club). The hall of the OAP & Lesmahagow Parish Historical Association, located at the Fountain area of the village, was used for the Sunday School, Ark and Summer Sunday School during these renovations. The kitchen was completely re-decorated during this period due to fire damage.
1993	New Sound System Fitted	In 1993 a new sound re-enforcement system was fitted in the church, consisting of a 100V line power amplification system and 6x cabinet speakers: 2 to the rear (pulpit end) of the church, 2 in downstairs window alcoves and 2 under the main balcony. A permanently fitted tape recorder was installed along with a loop system for magnetic pickup on hearing aids.
1991	Church and Manse Exteriors Renovated	Work was undertaken by the congregation to renovate the exteriors of the church and manse buildings. The interior of the bell tower and the loft area of the church were treated to protect them from dry rot.
1986 & 1987	Church Heating System Renovation	The heating system in the church was renovated during this period. The church met in the church hall during the renovation works.
1964	Hall Extension and Kitchen Addition	In 1964, a kitchen area was added to the church hall to the east end of the hall, to the right of the hall entrance. Additionally, an extension was made to the church hall. The kitchen and hall extensions were opened for use in 1965.
1955	Organ Modernisation and Repositioning	The organ was modernised and the keyboard section was re-situated to the relocation at the front of the chancel.
1941	Organ Renovation	In 1941 the church organ was renovated, and heating of the organ was improved to preserve the leather parts. A fund for a new organ was started in 1942.
1939	Canteen for Billeted Soldiers & 1940 - 1944 - Army Requisition	With the outbreak of the Second World War, Abbeygreen Church ran a canteen service for the soldiers billeted in the village and surrounding area. The Army requisitioned the use of the church hall from 1940 to 1944.
1936	Heating Upgrade and Installation of Electric Lighting	The heating for the church, both in terms of boiler house modifications and internal heating provision was upgraded and an electric lighting system was provided in the sanctuary with suspended pendant lighting for the upper and lower galleries.
1932	Building Addition: Church Hall and Vestry	A hall was built adjacent and to the north of the main church building. The long axis of the hall running in the same east-west direction as the church building and the entrance to the hall vestibule accessed along the north side of the church. A vestry was added between the hall and the church building, and the access corridor extended to underneath the northern rear gable window of the church, providing access to the church sanctuary directly from the vestry and church hall. The halls were completed and opened early in 1933.
1928	Communion Table Gifted	Presentation to Abbeygreen United Free Church of Scotland of a communion table in memory of Peter Alan Mackenzie Ballantyne.
1908	Church Renovated	In 1908 the church building underwent extensive renovation including changes to the chancel area.
1902	Organ Installation	Now being part of the United Free Church of Scotland, Andrew Watt, Organ builders, were contracted to build and install a pipe organ for leading and accompanying Psalm and Hymn singing during worship. The United Free Church of Scotland did not hold to the practice of exclusive psalmody.

== Sources ==
Where possible sources are referenced in the list below. However, one of the useful sources: ecclegen.com appears to be blocked by Wikipedia, therefore direct URL reference is not possible. In this case reference is given to the physical books: Annals of the Free Church of Scotland 1843-1900, edited by William Ewing, Volumes 1 & 2, pub. T&T Clark, Edinburgh. 1914. The reference provided is to the catalogue entry of the New College Library, 40 George Square, Edinburgh and to the volume and pages for the specific information.

Other sources referenced are in some cases geographical locations to the buildings and to historical Ordnance Survey Mapping and in this case reference is to the online mapping system and to the map section, which may not necessarily be the mapping of the correct year. The reader may have to review the mapping year in order to display the exact mapping referenced.
