= Lesmahagow Priory =

Priory in South Lanarkshire, Scotland

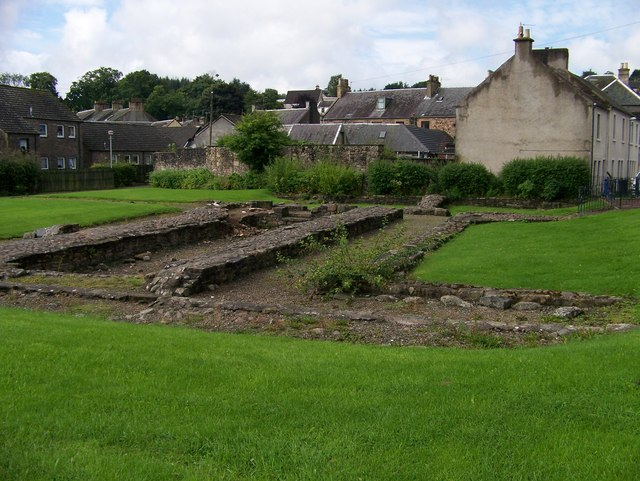
- Interactive map of Lesmahagow Priory

Monastery information
- Full name: Priory of the Virgin Mary of Lesmahagow
- Order: Tironensian
- Established: 1144
- Disestablished: c. 1607
- Mother house: Kelso Abbey (dependency)
- Dedication: Virgin Mary & Machutas

People
- Founders: David I, King of the Scots, and John, Bishop of Glasgow

Site
- Location: Lesmahagow (now South Lanarkshire, Scotland)

Lesmahagow Priory was a medieval Tironensian monastic community located in the small town of Lesmahagow in the modern local authority area of South Lanarkshire, Scotland. It was founded after John, Bishop of Glasgow and King David I of Scotland granted lands at Lesmahagow to Kelso Abbey with which to establish a new priory. It remained a dependency of Kelso Abbey. Control of the abbey was gradually secularized in the 16th century. Along with Kelso Abbey, it was turned into a secular lordship in 1607 for Robert Ker of Cesford, later earl of Roxburghe. Lesmahagow passed into the hand of James Hamilton, 2nd Marquess of Hamilton in 1623.

The village of Lesmahagow has two present day churches which trace their history back to the Abbey: Firstly, Lesmahagow Old Parish Church of the Church of Scotland, which lies on the site of the priory church and was built in its present form in 1804. And secondly Abbeygreen Church of the Free Church of Scotland which lies opposite the Glebe Park in Lesmahagow and was formed in 1843 by secession from the Church of Scotland and the building opened in 1844.

== See also ==
- Prior of Lesmahagow, for a list of priors and commendators

== Bibliography ==
- Cowan, Ian B. & Easson, David E., Medieval Religious Houses: Scotland With an Appendix on the Houses in the Isle of Man, Second Edition, (London, 1976), p. 69
- Watt, D.E.R. & Shead, N.F. (eds.), The Heads of Religious Houses in Scotland from the 12th to the 16th Centuries, The Scottish Records Society, New Series, Volume 24, (Edinburgh, 2001), pp. 134–6
