= David Forrest =

David Forrest may refer to:

- David Forrest (mint official), 16th-century Scottish Protestant activist
- David Forrest (academic) (born 1953), applied economist and econometrician
- David Forrest (pseudonym), author
- David Forrest (Australian politician) (1852–1917)
- David P. Forrest, U.S. politician
