= James Forrest (footballer, born 1894) =

Scottish footballer (born 1894)

Personal information
- Date of birth: 1894
- Place of birth: Lesmahagow, Scotland
- Position: Centre half

Senior career*
Years	Team	Apps	(Gls)
–	Nethanvale Thistle		
–	Maryhill		
1915–1924	Clyde	190	(1)
1924–1926	Preston North End	51	(0)
1926	Bethlehem Steel		
1926–1927	Cowdenbeath	24	(1)
1927–1929	Providence Clamdiggers		

International career
1921	Scottish League XI	1	(0)
- * Club domestic league appearances and goals

James Forrest (born 1894) was a Scottish footballer who played mainly as a centre half, featuring for Clyde (eight years) and Cowdenbeath in Scotland, Preston North End in England and Bethlehem Steel and Providence Clamdiggers in the United States.

Forrest was selected once for the Scottish Football League XI against the English Football League XI in 1921.
