= George Forrest =

George Forrest may refer to:

- G. Topham Forrest (George Topham Forrest, 1872–1945), principal architect for the London County Council
- George Forrest (author) (1915–1999), American author and musician
- George Forrest (botanist) (1873–1932), Scottish botanist and plant collector
- George Arthur Forrest (born 1940), Belgian businessman in the Belgian Congo
- George William Forrest (1845–1926), British journalist and historian
- George Forrest (Northern Ireland politician) (1921–1968), Ulster Unionist Member of Parliament for Mid Ulster
- George Forrest (soccer) (1904–1986), Canadian international soccer player
- George Forrest (VC) (1800–1859), Irish Victoria Cross recipient
- George Forrest (American politician) (c. 1870–?), mayor of Juneau, Alaska
- George Forrest (historian) (1925–1997), professor at the University of Oxford
- George W. Forrest (1838–1909), farmer and political figure in Nova Scotia

== See also ==
- Forrest (surname)
