= David Forrest (economist) =

David Kerr Forrest (born 1953) is an applied economist and econometrician who specialises in analysis of the sports and gambling industries. He has contributed substantially to literature on sport and gambling markets from the 1990s to the present. He regularly appears as a media expert in this area in the UK.

== Academic and research career ==
He completed his B.A. in economics from the University of Liverpool and followed this with an M.A. in economics from the University of Manchester. He obtained his Ph.D. in economics from the University of Western Ontario with his thesis covering "Unemployment and age structure: some consequences of the post-war baby boom."

After originally being employed as a visiting lecturer at McMaster University, he was appointed as a lecturer in the Economics department at the University of Liverpool and the University of Manchester in the early 1980s. In 1986 he joined the University of Salford as a lecturer, followed by positions as senior lecturer and reader before being appointed as professor of economics in 2007.

Since the late 1990s, he has had over 35 papers in refereed journals, 13 chapters in books and has been awarded various research awards and contracts in relation to this specialist interest areas. In 2008 he produced a report, with Ian McHale for the CCPR (a consortium of the major governing bodies for UK sport) on the threat of betting to the integrity of sport. With David Percy he has undertaken significant work for the National Lottery Commission. Since 2008, he has provided statistical work and previous to that provided consultancy advice for the same body on the fairness of the Lotto Extra (defunct) and Thunderball games, the randomness of the Lucky Dip facility in the Lotto game and the game itself and the fairness of the National Lottery draw.

He was awarded an honorary professorial position by Macao Polytechnic University.

== Media ==
Forrest contributes regularly to Media debates and his research into betting and corruption has been quoted widely around the world. In May 2008 he was quoted extensively on the front page of The New York Times in a story on corruption in sport, with this material also carried in the International Herald Tribune, the Los Angeles Daily News and Asian Age.

The publication of his report (co-authored with Ian McHale and Kevin McAuley) on betting and the integrity of sport attracted substantial coverage in The Daily Telegraph and was reported on BBC Radio 5 Live and the BBC World Service.

His research into the role of weather and toss in cricket received almost a full page of coverage in Wisden Cricketers' Almanack in April 2008.

His work has also been covered on BBC Radio & BBC Television, Sky News and various UK newspapers including The Times and The Guardian.

== Editorial work ==
He is on the board of editors of each of the following journals: the Journal of Sports Economics, International Gambling Studies, the International Journal of Sports Management and Marketing and the Journal of Gambling Business and Economics.
