= James Goodwin Forest =

Managed forest in North Carolina, United States

- Location within North Carolina
- Location: North Carolina, USA
- Nearest city: Carthage, North Carolina
- Coordinates: 35.3423750°N 79.4669718°W
- Area: 1,169 acres (473 ha)
- Established: 1968
- Governing body: NC Natural Resources Foundation

James Goodwin Forest is a 1,169-acre (473 ha) managed forest near Carthage, North Carolina. The forest is managed by the NC Natural Resources Foundation for NC State University's Department of Forestry and Environmental Resources.
