= James Forrest (adventurer) =

English adventurer

James Forrest is an English adventurer, hiker and author from Birmingham, England. In 2017 Forrest broke the record for the fastest known completion of all 446 mountains in England and Wales. He climbed every 2,000 ft mountain in England and Wales, peaks known as the 'Nuttalls', in six months, walking over 1,000 miles in the process. In 2018 Forrest climbed all 273 mountains in Ireland and Northern Ireland in eight weeks, the fastest known time. He walked over 1,000 km and climbed the height of Everest every week for eight weeks in a row in his mission to climb the so-called Vandeleur-Lynams, every mountain in Ireland and Northern Ireland over 600m.

== Bibliography ==
- Mountain Man: 446 Mountains. Six Months. One record-breaking adventure. Bloomsbury: London (2019). ISBN 9781844865642
