= Nita Forrest =

Canadian painter (1926–1996)

- Born: 1926; Quesnel, British Columbia
- Died: 1996 (aged 69–70); Victoria, British Columbia

Nita Forrest (1926–1996) was a Canadian painter.

Forrest was born in Quesnel, British Columbia, and while she was mostly self-taught, Forrest studied with Herbert Siebner and was influenced by both Maxwell Bates and Richard Ciccimarra.

Forrest directed the Print Gallery from when she founded it in 1968 until 1972.

Forrest had a joint exhibit with Vicky Husband at the Art Gallery in Burnaby, British Columbia in 1980. For a time, Forrest was a member of The Victoria Limners Society (a group that has included Maxwell Bates, Walter Dexter, Elza Mayhew, Myfanwy Pavelic, and Carole Sabiston among others).

Forrest's work is included in the collections of the Musée national des beaux-arts du Québec and the Art Gallery of Greater Victoria
