= Lesmahagow =

Town in South Lanarkshire, Scotland

Coordinates: 55.638°N 3.887°W

Lesmahagow: Scottish Gaelic: Lios MoChuda; Scots: Lismahagie or The Gow
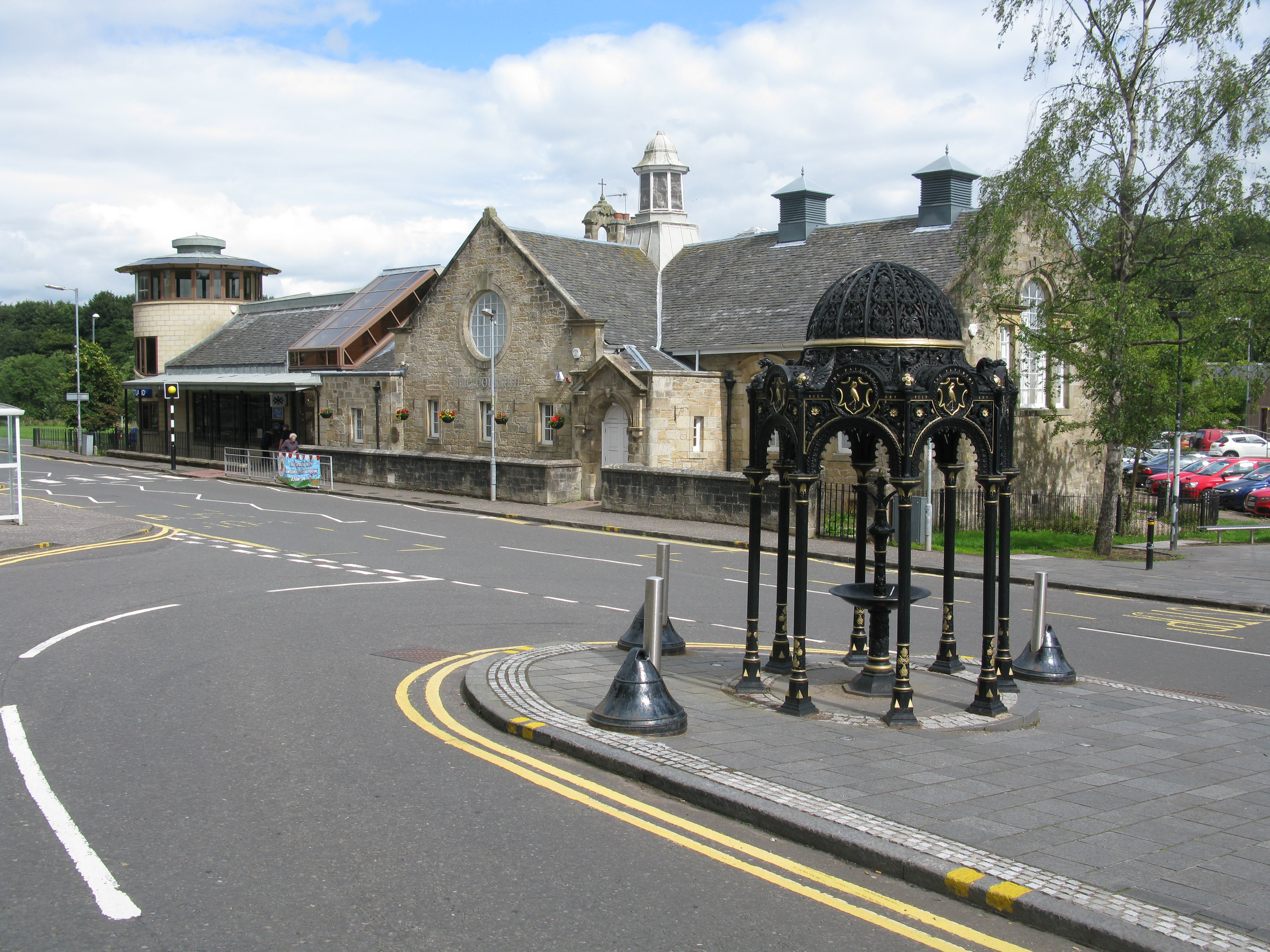
- Drinking Well in Lesmahagow town centre

- Location within South Lanarkshire
- Population: 4,300 (2020)
- OS grid reference: NS8139
  - Edinburgh: 35.8 miles (57.6 km)
  - London: 324 miles (521 km)
- Council area: South Lanarkshire
- Lieutenancy area: Lanarkshire
- Country: Scotland
- Sovereign state: United Kingdom
- Post town: LANARK
- Postcode district: ML11
- Dialling code: 01555
- Police: Scotland
- Fire: Scottish
- Ambulance: Scottish
- UK Parliament: Hamilton and Clyde Valley
- Scottish Parliament: Clydesdale

Lesmahagow (/lɛzməˈheɪɡoʊ/ LEZ-ma-HAY-go; Scots: Lismahagie or Lesmahagae; Scottish Gaelic: Lios MoChuda) is a town in South Lanarkshire, Scotland, on the edge of moorland near Lanark. It is also known as Abbey Green or the Gow. The town lies in the historic county of Lanarkshire.

Lesmahagow was also a civil parish. It lies west of the M74, and southeast of Kirkmuirhill.

== Etymology ==
The name means "Enclosure (meaning a walled area, like a monastery or fort) of St Machutus". The saint was born in Wales and may originally have been known as "Mahagw" prior to emigrating to Brittany where he became known by the Latinised form of the name and also as "St Malo". It is also possible that the first syllable may mean "garden" rather than "monastery", although Mac an Tailleir believes the former was altered from the latter in Gaelic.

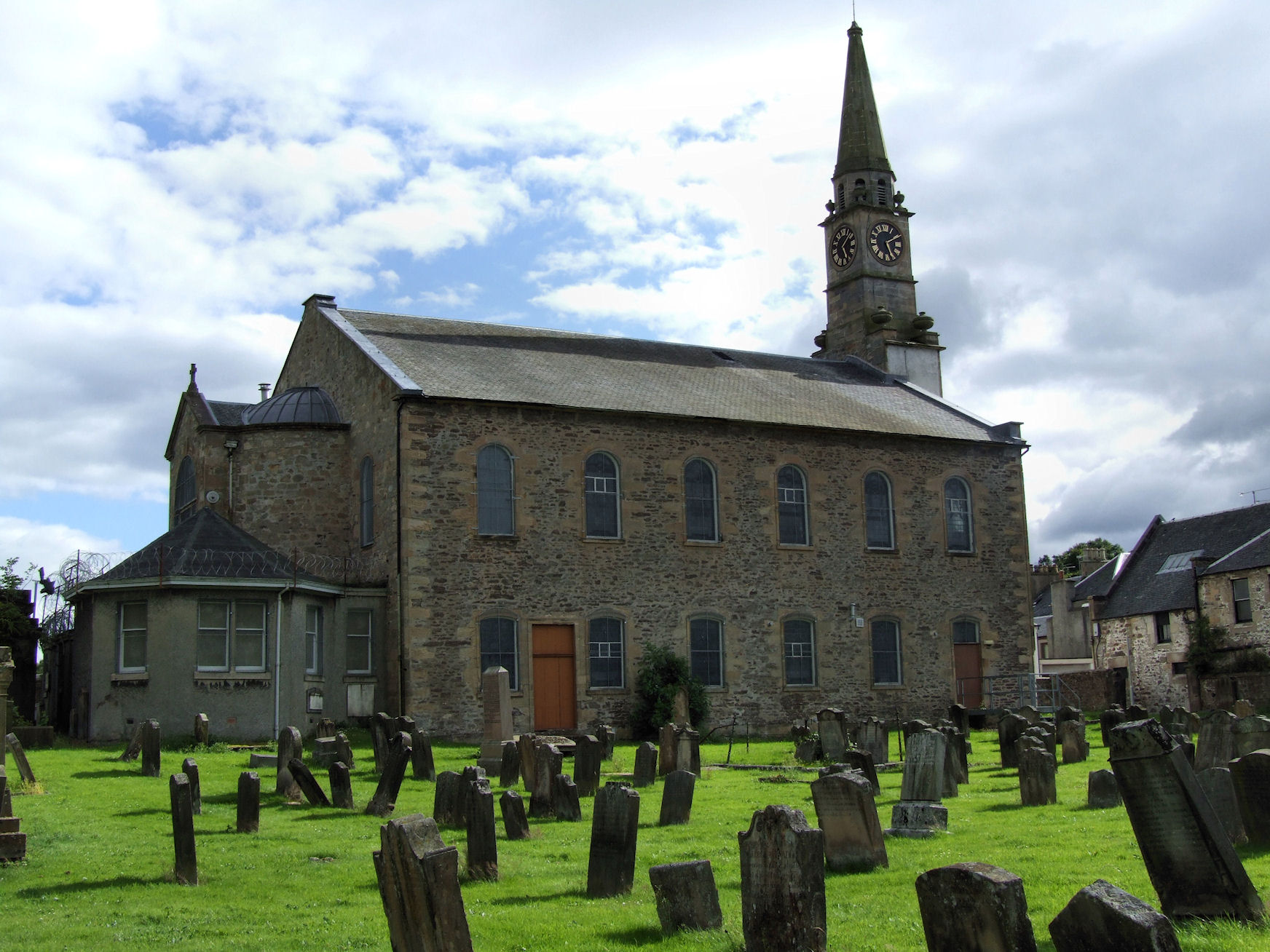
Lesmahagow Parish Church, Church of Scotland

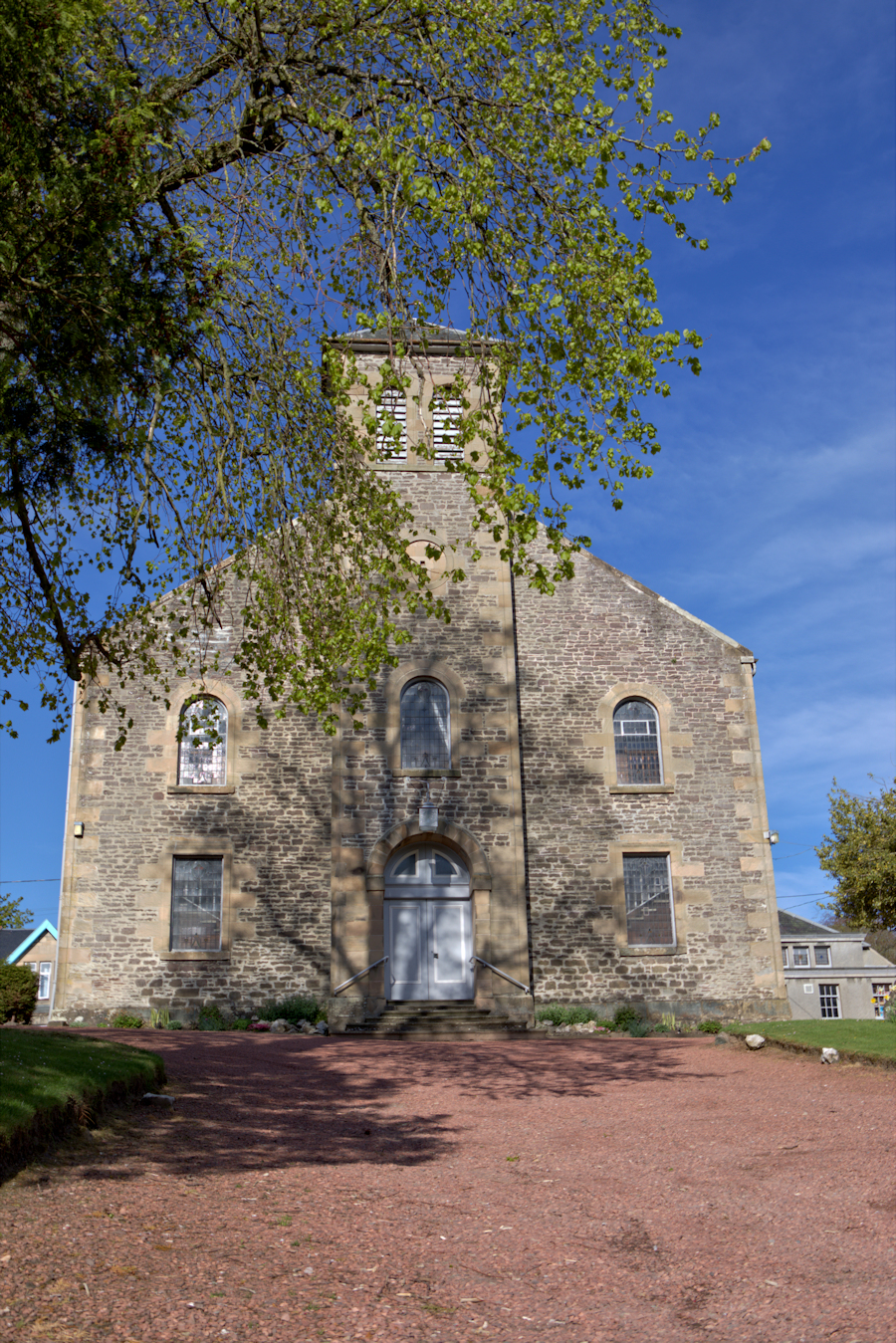
Abbeygreen Church, Free Church of Scotland

== Religion ==
The town has three Christian congregations, namely Lesmahagow Old Parish Church of the Church of Scotland and Abbeygreen Church of the Free Church of Scotland and an Evangelical congregation, (the Hope Hall) on the main street. Roman Catholic residents are served by Our Lady and St John's in the neighbouring village of Blackwood, 3 miles (5 km) away.

Lesmahagow Priory, founded by Benedictine monks in 1144, no longer stands but its foundations were excavated in 1978 and are located next to the Old Parish Church off Church Square.

The seat of ISKCON Scotland is located in Lesmahagow. The organisation operates an eco farm at this location, which serves as a centre for spiritual practice, community activities, and sustainable living in accordance with ISKCON principles.

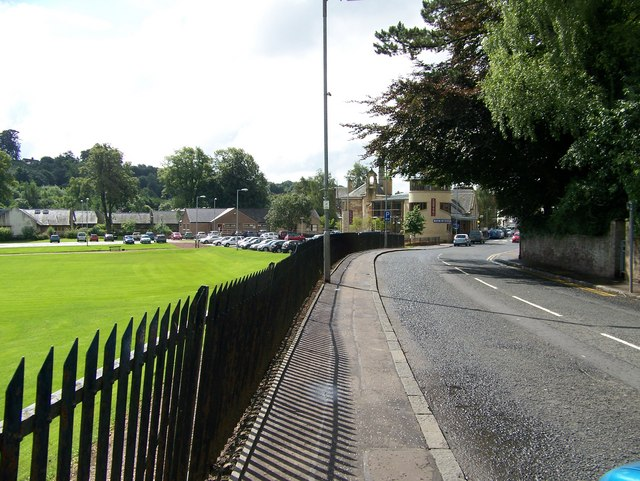
Abbeygreen, the road into Lesmahagow from the North. Glebe park on the left, Bank of Scotland & The Fountain ahead.

== Highland games ==
The Highland games are held annually in June with pipe bands competing in Grades 1 through 4, highland dancing, weight over the bar, tossing the caber, and archery. The first games was held in 1960 as a result of a collaboration between Lesmahagow F.C. and the now-defunct Vale of Nethan Pipe Band. Originally held in Craighead Park, it is now held in the Glebe Park and entry is free, mainly due to community fundraising events and a strong committee.

== Landmarks ==
Birkwood Castle and the River Nethan are nearby.

== Fossil discoveries ==
The basal anaspid, Lasanius genus, has been discovered near Lesmahagow.

== Notable persons ==
- John Cairncross (1913–1995), British civil servant and spy during World War II. He was alleged to be the fifth member of the Cambridge Five.
- John Greenshields (1795–1835), sculptor responsible for works such as Sir Walter Scott in Parliament House, Edinburgh.
- Jim Holton (1951–1993), Scottish football centre-half.
- Alexander Muir (1830–1906), composer of Canadian patriotic song "The Maple Leaf Forever".
