= William Forrest =

William Forrest may refer to:

- William Forrest (actor) (1902–1989), American actor
- William Forrest (Australian politician) (1835–1903), Australian pastoralist, businessman and politician
- William Forrest (poet) (fl. 1581), English priest and poet
- William Charles Forrest (1819–1902), British Army general
- William Duff Forrest (1874–1939), Canadian politician
- William H. Forrest (c. 1831–1875), American slave trader and Confederate leader under his brother Nathan Bedford Forrest's command
- Bill Forrest (1908–1965), football manager
