= Anne Marie Forrest =

Anne Marie Forrest is an author who grew up Blarney, County Cork, Ireland. After graduating from University College Cork, she completed her master's degree in Urban and Rural Planning at the University College Dublin. Having lived in various parts of Ireland, including Dublin and Wicklow as well as several years in Australia, she is now based in Cork.

After working as a town planner for several years, Anne Marie turned her attention to fiction writing. Her first novel, Who Will Love Polly Odlum? was published in 2000. She has published five further novels and her work has been translated into French, German, Spanish, Latvian and Norwegian. Anne Marie's writing has also appeared in Image Magazine, The Irish Times, The Irish Independent, The Evening Echo, and in several short story collections. Anne Marie Forrest is also a scriptwriter.

== Novels ==
- Who Will Love Polly Odlum? (2000)
- Dancing Days (2001)
- Something Sensational (2002)
- The Love Detective (2006)
- Love Potions (2008)
- Win Some, Love Some (2010)
