= Susan Forrest =

Australian geneticist

Susan Forrest is an Australian genomics expert and Director/CEO of the Australian Genome Research Facility (AGRF).

== Career ==
Forrest graduated with first class honours in Biochemistry and Genetics from Melbourne University in Australia. She received a scholarship in Medicine to do her doctorate at Oxford University with Professor Kay Davies. She researched the genetic basis of Duchenne muscular dystrophy.

She returned to Australia and joined the Murdoch Children's Research Institute (MCRI) in Melbourne. She continued research in genetics and headed the DNA Diagnostic Laboratory at MCRI. In 2001, she was appointed as scientific director at AGRF.

== Education ==
- BSc (honours) Biochemistry, Genetics at Melbourne University (1978-1981)
- DPhil Oxford University (1984-1988)
- B.Bus Administration, RMIT (1990-1995)
