= Lesmahagow Old Parish Church =

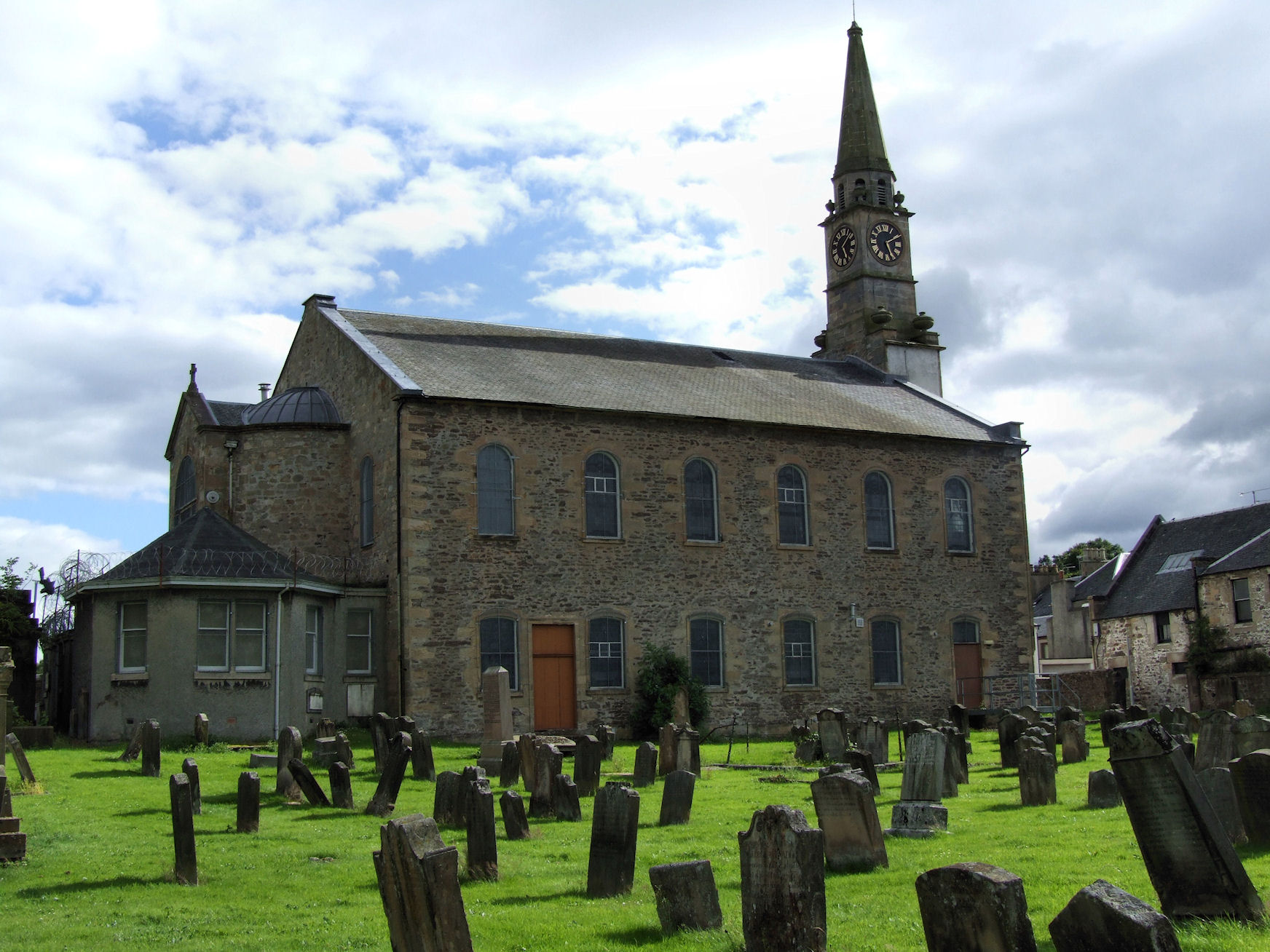
- Lesmahagow Old Parish Church
- 55°38′16″N 3°53′08″W
- Denomination: Church of Scotland
- Website: LOPC

Administration
- Parish: Lesmahagow

== Current Situation of Lesmahagow Old Parish Church ==
Lesmahagow Old Parish Church is a congregation of the Church of Scotland within the Presbytery of Lanark. It is situated on church square in the South Lanarkshire town of Lesmahagow. The current building was built in 1804 and, at the time, contained two charges (two congregations and ministers) of the Church of Scotland. In July 1998, the congregation was linked with Coalburn Parish Church (in the neighbouring village of Coalburn) on the retirement of the then minister of Coalburn Parish Church. Linkage is a formal procedure in the Church of Scotland allowing two congregations to share the same minister while remaining separate "charges" or congregations. The two congregations were formally united in 2017 by the mergers of the congregations, Kirk Sessions and Congregational Boards. From 2017, the Coalburn and Lesmahagow congregations of the Church of Scotland were considered as one charge while retaining two sets of buildings. The churches retained two sets of worship services in the two villages.

On 1 October 2023 evening worship of this Church of Scotland congregation was recommenced in Lesmahagow using the Lesmahagow Guide Hall (next to the Bowling Club) in the Turfholm area of the village.

In February 2025 the building was listed for sale on the Church of Scotland property website for offers over £50000, with a closing date of 3 July 2025.

== Historical Background to Lesmahagow Old Parish Church ==
A Culdee settlement of Celtic monks existed prior to the 12th Century. The church was dedicated in the name of St. Machutus (St. Malo). This dedication was retained when King David I of Scotland granted "the Church and lands of Lesmahagow" to the Tironensian Order of monks who had already established Kelso Abbey at Kelso.

The Priory Church was burnt in 1335 by troops under the command of John of Eltham, brother of King Edward I of England. Many people had sought sanctuary within the church at the time of the burning and are thought to have perished. Thereafter a new church was constructed and lasted until the early 19th century. The present church was constructed in 1804 on the original site. Originally built as a plain, rectangular church, an apse was constructed later in the 19th century and an organ (in the West Gallery) was built by Brindley & Foster and installed in 1889. The Chapter House was added in 1934. After serious damage by fire in 1981 the apse was restored and the entire church redecorated.

The church contains some notable stained glass. The centre panel of the East Window, "The Descent from the Cross" is a copy from the centre panel of the triptych painted by Rubens for an altar in Antwerp Cathedral in 1614.

The previous minister (since 2003 to approx 2011) was the Revd Aileen Robson. Next was Rev Morag Garret. Recent former ministers were the Revd Sheila Mitchell 1995-2002 (now a hospital chaplain in Ayr), preceded by the Revd William Niven 1969-1994 (who died in December 2004).

Lesmahagow Old Parish Church was linked with neighbouring Coalburn Parish Church in 1998 (i.e. sharing the same minister) and united into one congregation in 2017.

[View of Church and Cemetery:

[Picture of St. Malo:

Sources: Church of Scotland Yearbook and Churches to Visit in Scotland (2000 edition), published by St Andrew Press, Edinburgh, plus local information.

== See also ==
- List of Church of Scotland parishes
