= Fold Farmhouse =

Farmhouse in Kettlewell, North Yorkshire, England

Coordinates: 54.1460°N 2.0443°W

Fold Farmhouse is a historic building in Kettlewell, a village in North Yorkshire, in England.

The farmhouse lies in the village centre and was originally built in the late 15th century. It was originally an open hall house, probably owned by St Mary's Church, Kettlewell. In the 17th century, the timber framed building was encased in limestone, and it was altered in the 19th century, the work including replacing the windows. A porch was added in the 20th century, and the building was grade II* listed in 1989. It is noted for its elaborate roof structure, which is similar to those at Horbury Hall and Liley Hall, both in West Yorkshire.

The building has been encased in limestone, and has quoins and a stone slate roof. It has two storeys and five bays, the second bay projecting, and at the rear is a semicircular stair turret. The windows vary and include a fire window, a circular window and mullioned windows, and most are later sashes and casements. Inside, it is now divided into rooms, the central ground floor room having an 18th-century fireplace, and there is a stone newel staircase.

== See also ==
- Grade II* listed buildings in North Yorkshire (district)
- Listed buildings in Kettlewell with Starbotton
