= Roche baronets of Carass (1838) =

Escutcheon of the Roche baronets of Carass

The Roche baronetcy, of Carass in County Limerick, was created in the baronetage of the United Kingdom on 8 August 1838 for David Roche, Member of Parliament for Limerick. The 2nd Baronet was vice-lieutenant and high sheriff of County Limerick. The 3rd Baronet was a deputy lieutenant of County Carlow. The 4th Baronet was a naval commander.

== Roche baronets, of Carass (1838) ==
- Sir David Roche, 1st Baronet (1791–1865)
- Sir David Vandeleur Roche, 2nd Baronet (1833–1908)
- Sir Standish Roche, 3rd Baronet (1845–1914)
- Sir Standish O'Grady Roche, DSO, 4th Baronet (1911–1977)
- Sir David O'Grady Roche, 5th Baronet (born 21 September 1947). As of 2012, he was deputy chairman of the Standing Council of the Baronetage.

The heir apparent to the baronetcy is David Alexander O'Grady Roche (born 1976), youngest, but only surviving son of Sir David and Alexandra Roche, Lady Roche.

== Notes ==
Baronetage of the United Kingdom
Preceded by Forrest baronets	Roche baronets of Carass; 8 August 1838	Succeeded by Heywood baronets
