= Alexandra Roche, Lady Roche =

British aristocrat

The Honourable Lady Roche MBE JP

President of the Wharfedale Conservative Party

Bradford District Councillor of Wharfedale

Magistrate on the West London Bench

Personal details
- Born: Helen Alexandra Briscoe Gully; 8 June 1934 (age 92) Maidenhead, Berkshire
- Spouse(s): Roger d'Hauteville Moreton Frewen (1952-1966; divorced); Sir David O'Grady Roche, 5th Baronet (1971-present)
- Domestic partner: John Foster
- Children: 8
- Parent(s): Thomas Gully, 3rd Viscount Selby (father); Veronica Catherine George (mother)
- Relatives: Sir William Grey (great-grandfather)

Helen Alexandra Briscoe Roche, Lady Roche MBE JP (née Gully, formerly Frewen; born 8 June 1934), styled as The Honourable Lady Roche, is a British politician and former magistrate. A member of the Conservative Party, she served as a parish councillor and serves as the president of the Wharfedale Conservatives. Lady Roche served on the West London bench as a magistrate for forty years. She is an honorary patron of the Queen Charlotte's Ball and served on the ethics committee for St Mary's Hospital in Paddington, Charing Cross Hospital, Chelsea and Westminster Hospital, and Cromwell Hospital. She was created a Member of the Order of the British Empire in the 2017 New Year Honours for voluntary services.

== Early life and family ==
Lady Roche was born The Honourable Helen Alexandra Briscoe Gully on 8 June 1934 to Royal Naval Reserve officer Lieutenant-Commander Thomas Sutton Evelyn Gully, 3rd Viscount Selby and his wife, Veronica Catherine George. Through her paternal grandmother, Dorothy Evelyn Grey, she is a great-granddaughter of Sir William Grey, who served as Lieutenant-Governor of Bengal and as Governor of Jamaica, and is a descendant of the House of Grey. She is also a descendant of William Court Gully, 1st Viscount Selby, who served as Speaker of the House of Commons prior to his elevation to the peerage. She is a relative of three British Prime Ministers, Robert Anthony Eden, 1st Earl of Avon; and, by marriage, Sir Winston Churchill; Alexander Frederick Douglas-Home, Baron Home of the Hirsel.

== Adult life ==
In September 2019, Lady Roche and her second husband hosted Queen Charlotte's Ball at Lancaster House. She is an honorary patron of the ball, and of the non-profit organization The London Season, founded by Jennie Hallam-Peel.

Lady Roche served as a magistrate on the West London Bench for forty years and is the president of the Wharfedale branch of the Conservative Party. She has served as a volunteer with the Red Cross, served as a school governor, served on her local parish council, and served on the ethics committee for St Mary's Hospital in Paddington, Charing Cross Hospital, Chelsea and Westminster Hospital, and Cromwell Hospital.

She was made a Member of the Order of the British Empire for voluntary services during the 2017 New Year Honours.

=== Marriages and issue ===
Alexandra Gully first married Roger d'Hauteville Moreton Frewen / Frewen di Tuttavilla from 1971, the son of Hugh Moreton Frewen and Maria Elena Nunziante di Mignano, a daughter of Mariano, the Duke of Mignano. The couple had two children; Alexandra had a further three children whilst married to her husband:

- Jonathan Briscoe Moreton Frewen di Tuttavilla (born 4 November 1953)
- Selina Veronica Clara Frewen di Tuttavilla (born 3 May 1955, died 11 July 1972)
- Robert Edward Jerome Frewen (born 10 May 1957) [biological father Nicholas Clarke (1933-1979)]
- Charles Grey Justin Frewen (born 13 February 1959) [biological father Howard Hansen (1923-1996)]
- Emma Catherine Gully Frewen (born 18 August 1964) [biological father John Foster (1942-2015)]

She and her husband divorced in 1966. She married, secondly, Sir David O'Grady Roche, 5th Baronet on 24 June 1971. Her second husband, the son of Sir Standish O'Grady Roche, 4th Baronet, is Deputy Chairman of the Standing Council of the Baronetage. She and her second husband had three children:

- Standish George O'Grady Roche (born 28 April 1972, died 17 July 1974)
- David Alexander O'Grady Roche (born 28 January 1976)
- Cecilia Evelyn Jonnë Roche (born 23 May 1979)

She and her second husband live at Bridge House in Starbotton, North Yorkshire and at Lancaster Mews, London W2 3QE.
