= James Spittal =

Scottish silk merchant and Lord Provost of Edinburgh

Sir James Spittal KT
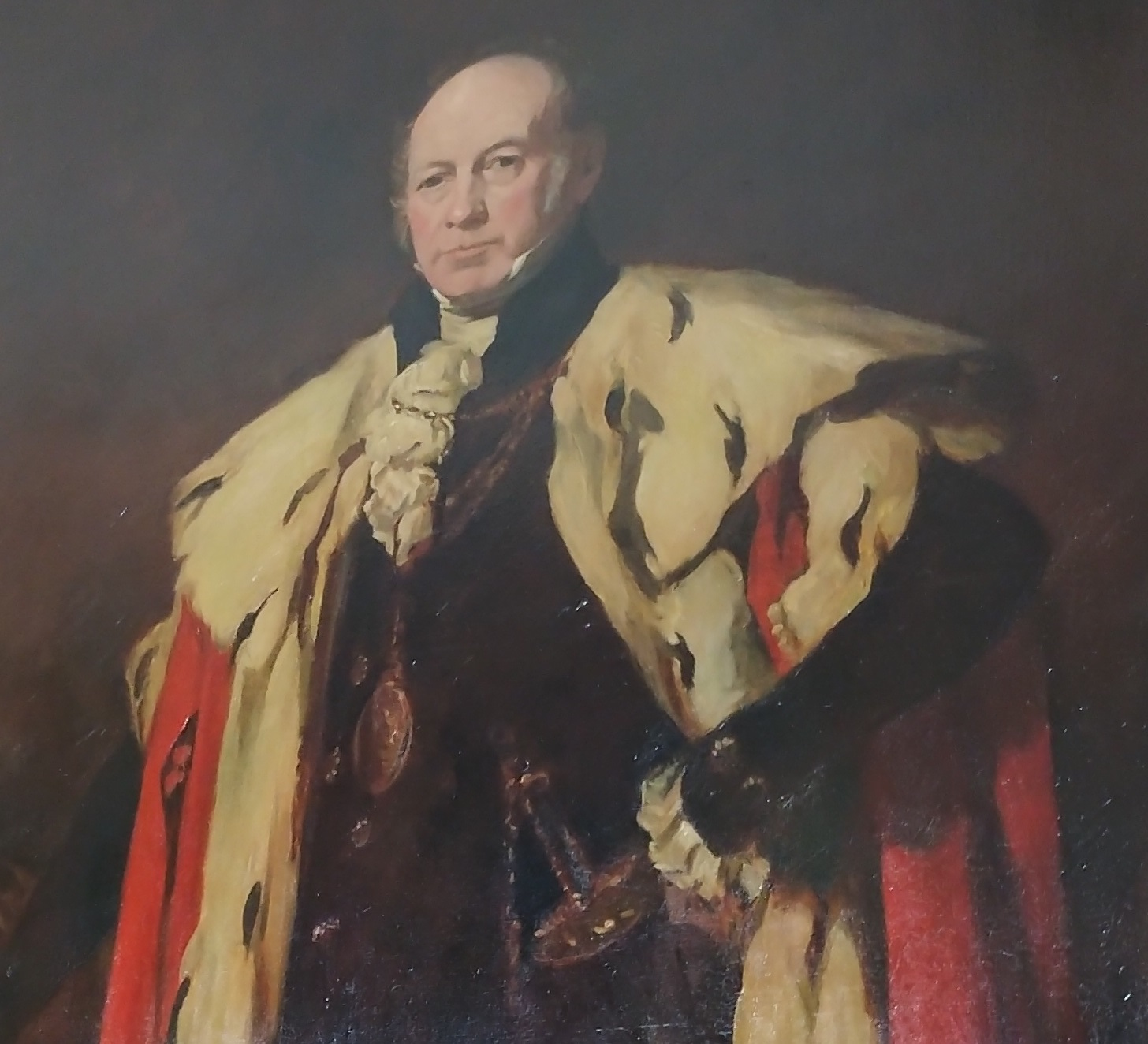
- Sir James Spittal painted by John Watson Gordon
- Born: 1769
- Died: 25 September 1842 (aged 73); Edinburgh, Scotland
- Spouses: Marion Brown (died 1824) Lady Mary Wightman Ker Spittal (m. 1826)
- Children: 7, including Robert Spittal

Sir James Spittal (1769 to 25 September 1842) was a Scottish silk merchant who was Lord Provost of Edinburgh 1833 to 1837. Spittal Street in the west of Edinburgh is named after him. He was a strong Whig politician who campaigned for election reforms to increase democracy.

== Biography ==
The name James Spittal does not appear in Edinburgh street directories until 1810, when he is listed as a haberdasher with a shop at 55 South Bridge, living at 59 South Bridge. Spittal later ran a successful silk and shawl shop at 12 St Andrew Square in Edinburgh's New Town.

In September and October 1815, Spittal took a tour of Europe, which he documented in a diary. This appeared to concentrate on sites connected to the recently concluded Napoleonic Wars.

Spittal stood for election as Lord Provost of Edinburgh in 1833 in succession to John Learmonth of Dean. He stood against James Aytoun (an advocate and uncle of William Edmondstoune Aytoun) in the important first election following the Burgh Police (Scotland) Act 1833. In the election campaign of 1833, there were both pro-Spittal and anti-Spittal election songs created. The pro song was entitled "Huzza for Provost Spittal". Unsurprisingly the opposing song was "Huzza for Provost Aytoun". The song alludes to his having recently purchased a country house called Justice Hall in Lauder in Berwickshire from James Justice Esq. At this time he is living separate from his family at 11 Nicholson Square in south Edinburgh.

He was succeeded as Lord Provost by Sir James Forrest, 1st Baronet of Comiston. Whilst serving as Provost he was painted by John Watson Gordon, a copy of this painting by David Alison (1882-1995) is held by the City of Edinburgh Council.

== Personal life ==
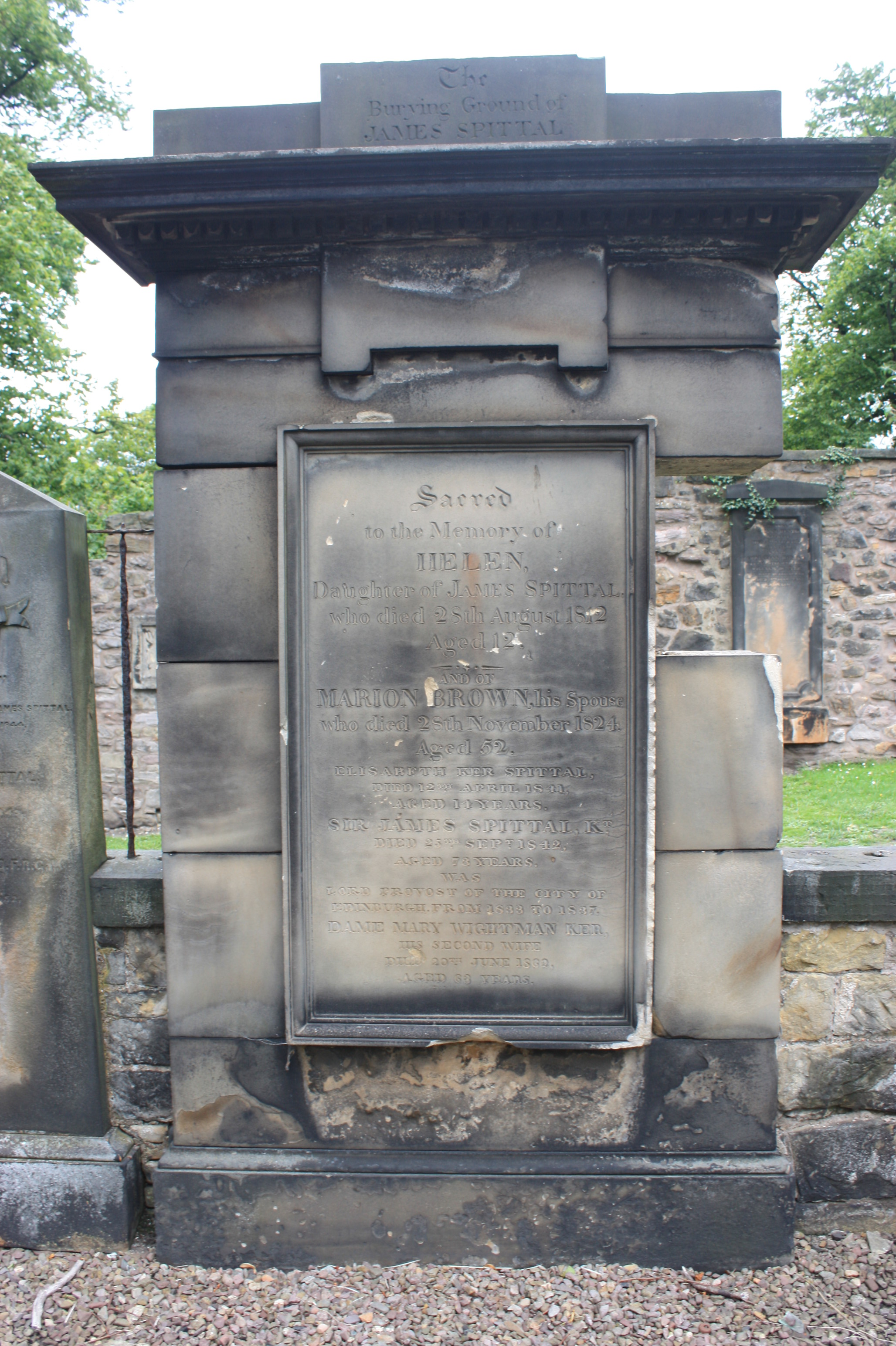
The grave of James Spittal, Greyfriars Kirkyard

He was the son of James Spittal senior as his name appears as James Spittal Jr in some documents.

He was married twice: firstly to Marion Brown (1772-1824) and secondly to Lady Mary Wightman Ker Spittal (1799-1862), thirty years his junior.

Children of the first marriage included James Spittal (1797-1844,. Joseph Mack Spittal, Dr Robert Spittal FRSE ( d.1852). Helen (1800-1812), and Marion (1805-1893) (who married Dr John Taylor FRCPE (1805-1856) and is buried with him in Dean Cemetery).

Children of the second marriage (c.1825) were Elisabeth Ker Spittal (1827-1841) and John, later Rev John Spittal, who was only nine years old when James Spittal died. His granddaughter Etheldred Spittal married Percival Stacy Waddy.

He died at home at 3 Minto Street in south-east Edinburgh on 25 September 1842. He is buried in Greyfriars Kirkyard. The grave lies within the western extension.
