= Shanghai International Debutante Ball =

Debutante ball in Shanghai, China

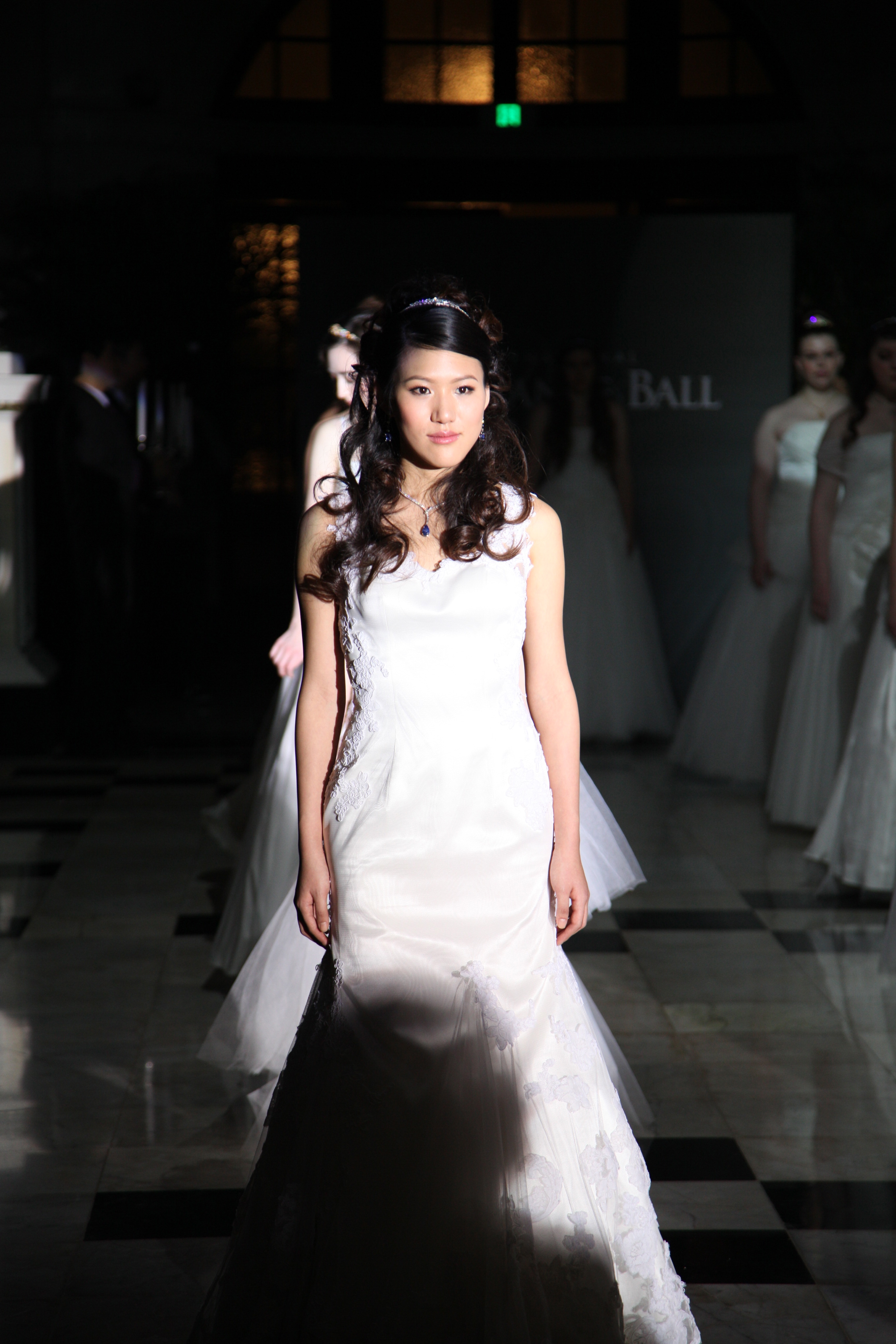
- A debutante at the inaugural ball in 2012
- Genre: debutante ball
- Frequency: annually
- Location: Shanghai, China
- Inaugurated: 2012
- Founder: Vivian Chow Wong

The Shanghai International Debutante Ball is a Chinese debutante ball held annually in Shanghai.

== History ==
The ball was established in 2012 at the Waldorf Astoria Hotel in Shanghai. It was organized by Vivian Chow Wong, a socialite and daughter of Zhou Xinfang, with the assistance of The London Season, a British company responsible for organizing the modern Queen Charlotte's Ball. The first debutante class was made up of thirteen women, none of whom were from Mainland China. The first thirteen debutantes were from Hong Kong, Taiwan, Australia, and the United Kingdom. A "debutante of the year" is chosen at each ball.

In 2016, the ball was held at The Peninsula Shanghai, and fourteen women were presented from China, Germany, Poland, Spain, Italy, France, the United Kingdom, and the United States.

Chaumet and Guerlain are corporate sponsors for the Shanghai International Debutante Ball.
