= Starbotton =

Village in North Yorkshire, England

Coordinates: 54.1683°N 2.0712°W

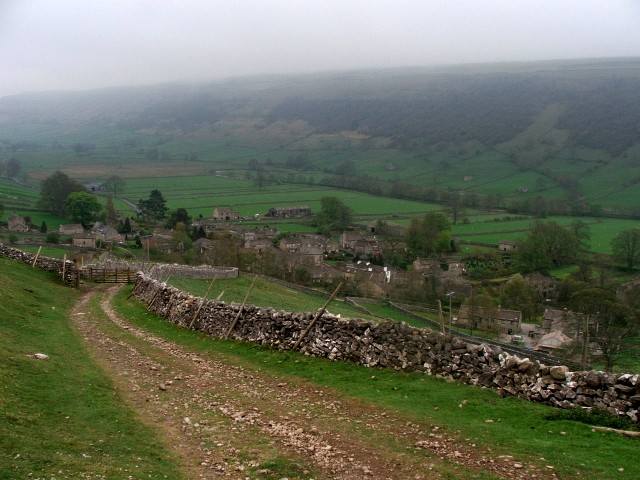

- Location within North Yorkshire
- Population: fewer than 50
- OS grid reference: SD953747
- Civil parish: Kettlewell with Starbotton
- Unitary authority: North Yorkshire
- Ceremonial county: North Yorkshire
- Region: Yorkshire and the Humber
- Country: England
- Sovereign state: United Kingdom
- Post town: SKIPTON
- Postcode district: BD23
- Dialling code: 01756
- Police: North Yorkshire
- Fire: North Yorkshire
- Ambulance: Yorkshire
- UK Parliament: Skipton and Ripon

Starbotton is a village of around 60 houses in Upper Wharfedale in the county of North Yorkshire, England. It is situated in the Yorkshire Dales National Park, by the River Wharfe. The resident population is around 48 and many village houses are used for holiday accommodation. There are two working farms - one at either end of the village, the rest having been converted for other uses. The village is on the opposite bank of the Wharfe to the Dales Way halfway between Kettlewell and Buckden.

Until 1974 it was part of the West Riding of Yorkshire. From 1974 to 2023 it was part of the Craven District, it is now administered by the unitary North Yorkshire Council.

== Etymology ==
The derivation of the name is the subject of much debate. It is thought to be derived from "Stamphotne" (1086 Domesday Book) or "Stauerboten" (12th century - Old English "stæfer" replacing the Norse "stafn" in the first form and meaning "the place where stakes are got").

== History ==
People have lived in this part of the dale since at least the Iron Age. The area is criss-crossed with pack horse trails from the time when the great monasteries like Fountains Abbey, Jervaulx and Rievaulx traded wool and other goods across this part of the Pennines.

Starbotton has a Quaker burial ground (which was restored as a Millennium Project), a cash machine and a public house, the Fox and Hounds, but no church, although there used to be a Wesleyan chapel. Footpaths lead from Starbotton in five directions, up to the top of Buckden Pike and on to Walden, down the river to Kettlewell, up the river to Buckden, over the top to Arncliffe and over to Coverdale (via Cam Road).

Other interesting features include the smelt flue leading up from the back of the village to the smelt chimney above Cam Gill. This is a remnant of the Smeltmill. It is still possible to crawl through parts of the flue as it climbs the hillside. This was the principal job for children at the mill - to collect the white lead oxide from the sides of the flue. Hence the number of very young people buried in the churchyard at Kettlewell in the 18th and 19th centuries.

There was a small quarry next to the bridge over Cam Gill Beck leading up to Cam Road (accessed from the lane beside the Fox and Hounds). Many of the buildings in the village were constructed from its stone. This was also refurbished as part of the Millennium Project for the village and the quarry face was replanted to stabilise the hillside. There is also a small pound on the lane at the back of the pub - originally for housing stray animals.

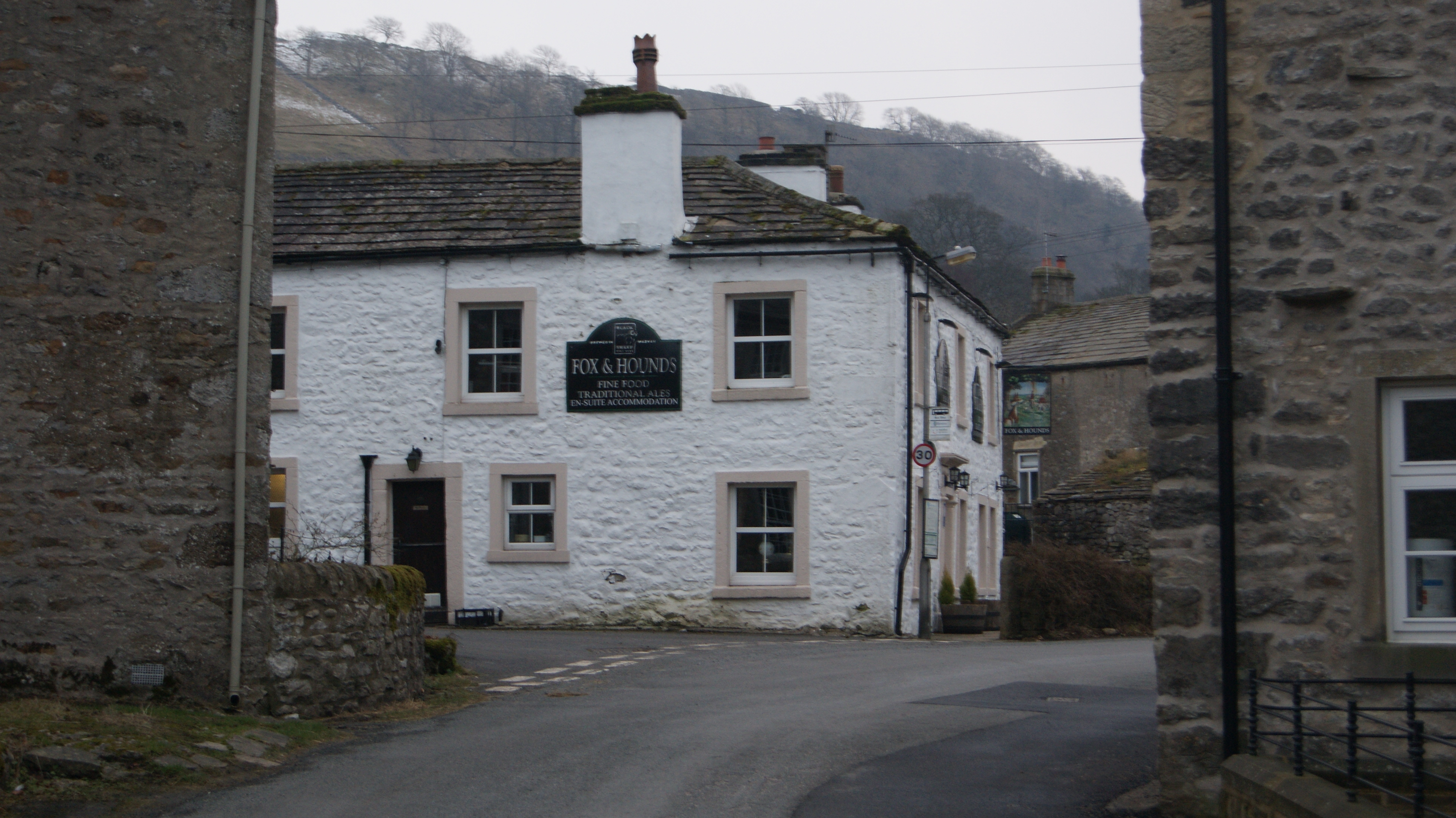
Fox & Hounds, Starbotton (February 2013)

The imposing house with a pointed arch window, looking down the road (next to the pub), was built for the manager of the Smelt Mill. In addition, the barn with an external staircase (restored in 2009), on the bend in the road opposite the Fox and Hounds, once housed a drovers' bar on the upper floor. Beasts could be accommodated at ground level. A little further up the road travelling towards Buckden the last house on the right hand side is below road level. This was the original pub in the village and its position shows how much the road was raised when the ford across the Cam Gill Beck was converted to a bridge. For many years there was a vast pile of rubble (now removed back to the remaining walls) standing to the north of the former pub. This was once a large barn that, to quote one of the oldest residents (when in his 90s), "collapsed when my wife looked at it - she was a stern woman!". There have been plans for its reinstatement for many years.

On the opposite side of the road, just before the bridge, is what appears to be a small gatehouse beside the entrance gateway to a Victorian dwelling. The roof to this was broken by a loose tank gun, which swung out of control, on a convoy moving through the Dale prior to D-Day. The owner at the time was too patriotic to claim the costs of the repair and it was not refurbished until the early 2000s. The Victorian house itself is an extension of a much older Dales Long Barn. The older part appears now as the small cottage attached to the Victorian villa at the end furthest from the road. The neighbouring Cleveliot House (subsequently extended) was built in the 1980s in the style of a typical Dales house of the late 18th century on the site of a former barn dating from 1685.

The major disaster that struck the village occurred in June 1686 when a tremendous rainstorm caused a flash flood, resulted in much of the village being swept away. This occurred only shortly after the rebuilding of the village had started - the earliest dated building being from 1621. Those not damaged beyond repair were restored and new ones built in the late 17th century.

There was an old hall near the gill, converted into three cottages. It went into ruin in the 19th century; one room was used for salving sheep (a procedure that pre-dated sheep dip). Dated stones from other houses have been built into it but the true reference is inscribed WS 1663 TS. Lady Anne Clifford spent the night of 26 July 1667 here on one of her journeys up the dale to her Westmorland estates. She wrote in her diary I went into John Symondson's house at Starbotton in Craven, where I lay one night, and then on to Pendragon.

There is a drinking water tap (discreetly placed) in a lane off to the right of the main road through the village before reaching the pub (when approaching from Kettlewell), close to the site of what was once the village school (now a private house). There are no other public facilities apart from a phone booth and post box - both close to the former Village Institute that originally housed the post office, which closed in 1971. Starbotton was a conservation area status in 1969, and the present day boundaries of this area cover 6.3 hectares (16 acres).

On 5 July 2014, the Tour de France Stage 1 from Leeds to Harrogate passed through the village.

== Geography ==
Starbotton lies on the valley floor of Upper Wharfedale, some 3 kilometres (1.9 mi) north of Kettlewell, and 24 kilometres (15 mi) south-west of Leyburn. The B6160 runs along the valley floor in a north/south direction connecting the village with Kettlewell and Buckden. Until 1832, when a new bridge was built over Cam Gill beck in the village, the main route through the dale was higher up the valley side.

Cam Road is a green lane and has been closed to motor vehicles by the Yorkshire Dales National Park Authority (under the authority of the Natural Environment and Rural Communities Act 2006) as part of an experiment to reverse damage caused by off-roaders. The main damage was caused by trail bikes on the steep section and sharp bends just before it enters the village – resulting in the bed of the track becoming almost impassable to pedestrians. Once the surface had been broken, subsequent rains washed the remaining soils away leaving nothing but stone. Even attempts to fill the holes with quarry waste were undone by the traction from motorbikes which sprayed the loose chippings down the hillside.

== Tourism ==
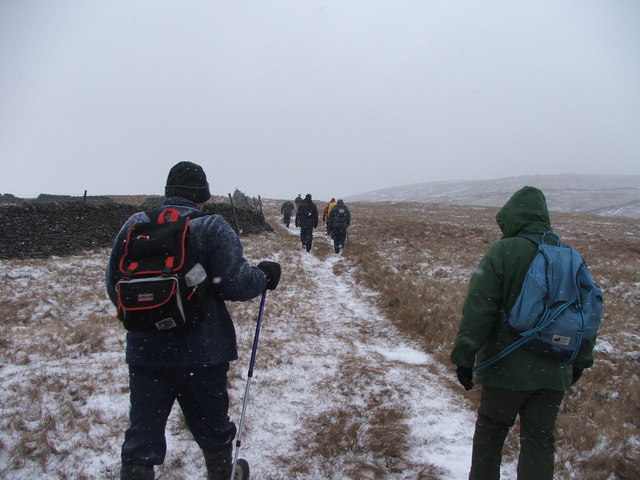
Starbotton is popular with ramblers year round (seen here at Starbotton peat grounds).

Tourism is an important part of the economy in the Starbotton area. Starbotton is near the Dales Way and Buckden Pike making it popular with ramblers. Starbotton has one pub, the Fox and Hounds, which provides accommodation. There is further accommodation at nearby Buckden and also in Kettlewell which includes a Youth Hostel. There is a bus route that connects the village to Kettlewell, Grassington and Ilkley (where a railway station has services to both Leeds and Bradford). Owing to their popularity with tourists these buses run to different timetables in summer and winter.

== Notable people ==
- Alexandra Roche, Lady Roche lives in the village.
- Ex-BriSCA F1 stock car driver Mike Close, number 199, hailed from Starbotton. Mike was the F1 stock car world champion in 1977, winning the title at Coventry Stadium, and an accomplished car innovator and competitor during the 1970s and early to mid 1980s. Mike won 554 races including over 100 finals and picked up championship trophies for the British (1973, 1979), European (1982, 1983), National points (1982), Grand National (1984), BriSCA Supreme (1986) and Daily Mirror Grand Prix (1984). Mike can be seen "racing his F1 stock car" in a £1000 'Dash for the Cash' race at Manchester's Belle Vue Stadium, 1986.

== See also ==
- Listed buildings in Kettlewell with Starbotton
