= Scargill House =

Ecumenical conference centre in North Yorkshire, England

Coordinates: 54.13558°N 2.03529°W

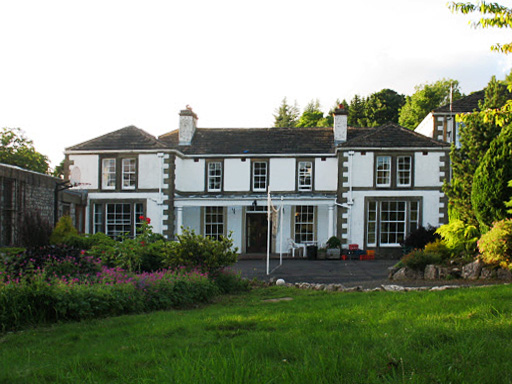
Scargill House, 2008

Scargill House is a Christian conference Centre run by the Scargill Movement and located in Wharfedale, in the county of North Yorkshire, England.

Scargill House lies ¾ mile (1.2 km) from the village of Kettlewell and four miles (6.4 km) from Grassington. The nearest market town, Skipton, is 14 miles (22.4 km) away. The house dates from the eighteenth century and is constructed of stone, rendered and colour-washed, under a stone flag roof. The Grade II*-listed chapel was built in 1960.

The woodland at Scargill is accredited by the Forest Stewardship Council as a highly important conservation site.

== Name ==
The name Scargill is taken from features in the estate landscape. Above the house is a bare natural wall of limestone, known locally as a scar, bounded on one side by a now dry gully, known as a ghyll (gill).

== History ==
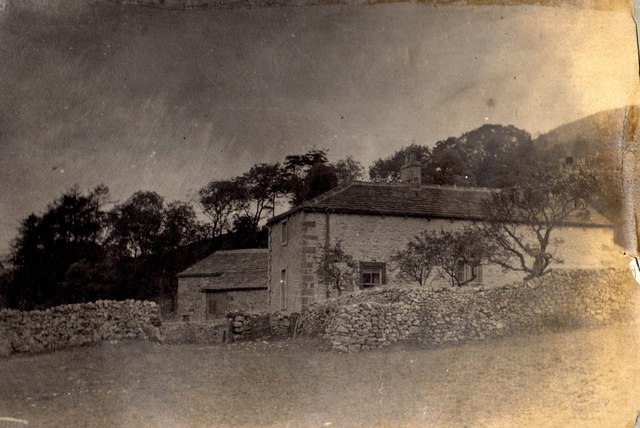
Scargill House, c. 1901

The recent history of Scargill House can be summarised as follows:

=== As a house ===
Clement Holdsworth bought Scargill House from John Overend Wood in 1900 as a residence from which he shot grouse on Conistone moor and fished for trout on the River Wharfe. It remained in the Holdsworth family for almost 57 years until William Holdsworth decided to live on his Irish estate at Bellinter House and sold the house and estate at auction to the Church of England in November 1957.

The estate was described in the auction catalogue as an "exceptional residential, agricultural and sporting property" extending to 1,050 acres (425 ha), which included:

- two stock farms each of about 500 acres (200 ha)
- about 70 acres (28 ha) park and afforestation land
- properties in nearby Kettlewell
- over a mile of trout fishing in the River Wharfe
- shooting rights over 3,000 acres (1,200 ha) of Conistone Moor
- the right to Pew Sittings in the Parish Church of Kettlewell and share in the Lordship

They claimed that "the invigorating air and the completely unspoilt grandeur of the surroundings make the Property a most attractive and healthy resort"; and that the grounds of the house included a tree-lined drive, stone-pillared and wrought iron entrance, lawns and an ornamental water garden.

=== As a Christian community and conference centre ===
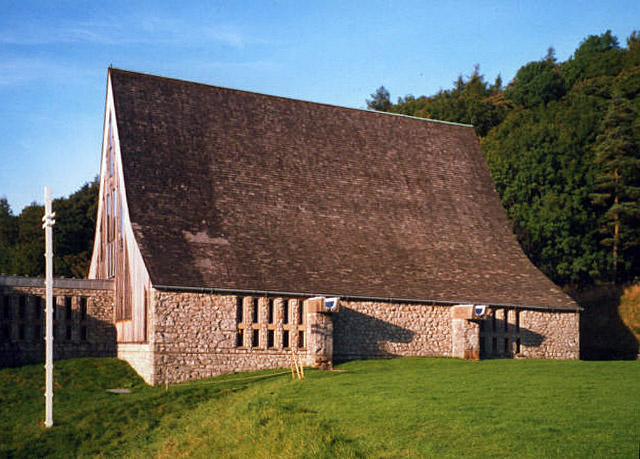
The chapel at Scargill House Christian conference centre, dating from 1960 and designed by George Pace

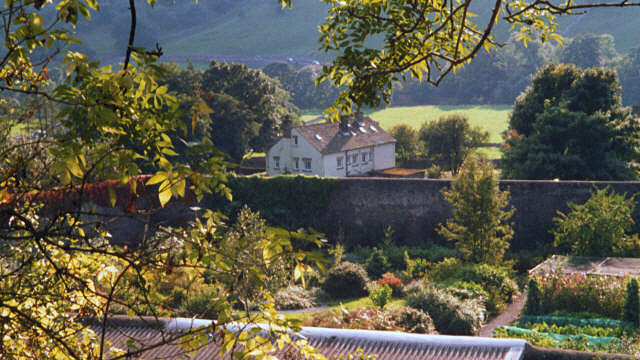
The walled garden at Scargill House

The Church of England bought the estate for the establishment of a Christian Community in 1957. In 1959 Scargill became a centre for conferences and events specialising in multi-faith, youth and environmental issues.

Since then, it has been largely reconstructed and extended to cater for the many groups that use its facilities. In 1960, a chapel was built by George Pace of York in a Scandinavian style reflecting the location's history, and is now listed. The chapel was built in limestone with a roof shingled in red cedar. It has a rectangular plan, with aisles and a serpentine link to the house. The roof is steeply pitched. The gables contain mullioned and transomed windows of varying sizes, rising to the apex of the gable.

=== As part of the Scargill Movement ===
In 2008, it was announced that the centre would be closing on 20 July 2008 due to financial difficulties, and profits from the sale of the estate would be used to set up a foundation. It was put on the market for £2.5 million.

The Foundation formed is The Wharfedale Foundation, a grant awarding foundation funding "organisations and initiatives in Yorkshire and the Humber that bring communities together, support communities who feel marginalised and forgotten, or build bridges between communities."

The centre was sold in March 2009 to a newly formed registered charity called the Scargill Movement, who are committed to continuing and developing Scargill House in continuation of its original vision, ministry and mission as a “Lee Abbey of the North”. It continues as a Christian centre run by a resident community, providing “a resource for the Church, providing a safe place for individuals and groups to meet with God and one another.” The sale price of £1,295,000 was made possible by an individual donation plus a one-year loan from the Lee Abbey Movement.

== See also ==
- List of works by George Pace
- Listed buildings in Kettlewell with Starbotton
