= Listed buildings in Kettlewell with Starbotton =

Kettlewell with Starbotton is a civil parish in the county of North Yorkshire, England. It contains 33 listed buildings that are recorded in the National Heritage List for England. Of these, three are listed at Grade II*, the middle of the three grades, and the others are at Grade II, the lowest grade. The parish contains the villages of Kettlewell and Starbotton and the surrounding countryside. Most of the listed buildings are houses, cottages, farmhouses and farm building. The others include a church and a grave slab in the churchyard, two bridges, two public houses, a limekiln, two telephone kiosks, and two buildings associated with Scargill House.

== Key ==
Grade	Criteria
II*	Particularly important buildings of more than special interest
II	Buildings of national importance and special interest

== Buildings ==
Name and location	Photograph	Date	Notes	Grade
Fold Farmhouse; 54.14606°N 2.04431°W	—	Early 16th century (probable)	Originally a timber framed open hall house, it has been encased in limestone, and has quoins and a stone slate roof. There are two storeys and five bays, the second bay projecting, and at the rear is a semicircular stair turret. The windows vary and include a fire window, a circular window and mullioned windows, and most are later sashes and casements.	II*
Home Farmhouse; 54.16903°N 2.07384°W	—	1621	The house is in limestone, with gritstone dressings, quoins, and a stone slate roof. There are two storeys and four bays. On the right is a doorway with a chamfered quoined surround, and a triangular-arched lintel with two plaques carved with initials and the date. To the left is a doorway with quoined jambs, a triangular doorhead, and a dated and initialled lintel. Above the ground floor openings is a stepped hood mould. The ground floor windows are mullioned, and in the upper floor are sash windows.	II
The Old Hall; 54.14693°N 2.04457°W	—	Early to mid 17th century	The house is in limestone with some rendering, on a partial plinth, with gritstone dressings, quoins, and a stone slate roof. There are two storeys and five bays. The doorway has chamfered quoined jambs and a triangular head. The windows are recessed, chamfered and mullioned. Below the eaves is a row of ten pigeon holes, and at the rear are small square chamfered openings.	II
West Gate Farmhouse and barn 54.14727°N 2.04644°W	—	1645	The farmhouse is pebbledashed, with gritstone dressings and a stone slate roof. There are two storeys and three bays. The doorway has chamfered jambs, a triangular head and a lintel containing a recessed shield-shaped plaque with initials and the date, and the windows are sashes. The barn to the right has three bays, the right two bays projecting. Its doorway has quoined jambs, and there is a small square window.	II
The Vicarage; 54.14707°N 2.04621°W	—	1647	The house, which was extended in the 18th century, is in limestone with gritstone dressings, quoins, and a stone slate roof. There are two storeys, three bays, and an added bay to the left, and two bays on the returns. The doorway has a moulded surround, quoined jambs, and a dated lintel. Some windows are mullioned, and others are sashes.	II
Box Tree Cottage; 54.16836°N 2.07276°W	—	17th century	The house is in limestone with quoins and a stone slate roof. There are two storeys and three bays. The central doorway has a chamfered quoined surround, and the windows are recessed and mullioned. On the left return is a projecting semicircular oven.	II
Crag Farmhouse; 54.16962°N 2.07539°W	—	17th century	The house is in limestone with quoins and a stone slate roof. There are two storeys, four bays, and a rear outshut with a round corner.. The doorway has a chamfered quoined surround, and most of the windows are mullioned.	II
The Green; 54.14620°N 2.04663°W	—	Mid 17th century	The house is in limestone, with gritstone dressings, and a stone slate roof. There are two storeys and three bays. On the front is a doorway converted into a window, with a shallow pointed arch and initials in a spandrel, and the doorways have plain surrounds. The windows vary, most are mullioned, and there are two narrow windows, one with a round head.	II
Cam Cottage and Wellside; 54.16932°N 2.07185°W		1655	Originally the main range of The Old Hall, later two houses, in limestone, with quoins and a stone slate roof. There are two storeys, Cam Cottage on the left has two bays, and Wellside has three. Cam Cottage has a doorway with chamfered jambs, and a cambered doorhead with a dated and initialled lintel. The doorway in Wellside is flanked by three-light stepped mullioned windows, and the other windows in both houses are small-paned. In the upper floor between the houses is a dated plaque, and at the rear is a dated sundial.	II
Lilac Cottage; 54.16860°N 2.07206°W		1656	The house is in limestone with quoins on the right and a stone slate roof. There are two storeys and two bays. The doorway has a chamfered surround, and a segmental doorhead containing recessed panels with initials and the date. The windows are recessed, chamfered and mullioned, with hood moulds in the ground floor.	II
Beck Cottage; 54.16940°N 2.07195°W		1663	Originally the north wing of The Old Hall, later a house, in limestone, with quoins and a stone slate roof. There are two storeys and two bays at right angles, both gabled. The doorway has moulded jambs, and a large lintel with the date and initials i n relief. Most of the windows have chamfered surrounds.	II
Manor Cottage; 54.14632°N 2.04646°W	—	1663	The house is in limestone, with gritstone dressings, quoins, and a stone slate roof. There are two storeys, three bays, and a rear outshut. In the south front is a 20th-century casement window, and the other windows are mullioned, with a continuous hood mould over the ground floor windows. At the rear, facing the street, is a projecting bay with a curved stair wall in the angle, there is one mullioned window, and the other windows are sashes.	II
Hill Top House; 54.17003°N 2.07400°W	—	1670	The house is in limestone, with quoins, and a stone slate roof with gable coping and kneelers. There are two storeys, a main range of four bays, and a rear range of two bays. On the front is a doorway with a moulded cornice, and to its right is a blocked doorway with chamfered quoins and a lintel with a segmental arch. In the rear range is a doorway with a re-set lintel containing a triangular arch and two panels with initials and the date. The windows vary.	II
Peace Cottage; 54.16846°N 2.07342°W	—	Late 17th century	The house is in limestone, with gritstone dressings, quoins and a stone slate roof. There are two storeys and fronts of two bays. On the main front and on the right return are gabled porches. There is one small window with a chamfered surround, and the other widows are mullioned with casements.	II
Post House; 54.16862°N 2.07357°W	—	Late 17th century	The house is in limestone, with gritstone dressings, quoins and a stone slate roof. There are two storeys and three bays. The doorway has a chamfered quoined surround and pitched stone hood on shaped corbels, and the windows are mullioned.	II
Grave slab 54.14607°N 2.04519°W	—	1695	The grave slab is in the churchyard of St Mary's Church, to the south of the chancel. It is in gritstone and has a moulded edge. The slab is divided into three sections, and has inscriptions and decorations.	II
Low Hall; 54.14646°N 2.04880°W	—	Early to mid 18th century	The house is in limestone, partly rendered, with quoins, paired gutter brackets, and a stone slate roof with gable copings and shaped kneelers. There are two storeys and three bays. On the south front is a doorway with pilasters, a lintel with an initialled and dated plaque, and a cornice. The windows on the front are sashes. At the rear is a tall stair window with a transom, and a two-light mullioned window.	II
The Manor House; 54.14622°N 2.04611°W	—	Early to mid 18th century	The house is in limestone, with quoins, moulded gutter brackets, and a stone slate roof. There are two storeys and a front of three bays, and a two-bay rear wing. The central doorway has an architrave with pilasters, an entablature and a cornice, above which is a panel flanked by three scrolls forming an apron to the central first floor window. The windows are sashes, and at the rear is a round-headed stair window with an architrave, pilasters and voussoirs.	II
Beckside; 54.16932°N 2.07357°W		Mid 18th century	A house in limestone with quoins and a stone slate roof. There are two storeys and three bays. The central doorway has a plain surround, and a semicircular fanlight above the lintel with Gothic tracery. The windows have shaped stone surrounds, in the ground floor they are sashes, and in the upper floor they are casements.	II
The King's Head; 54.14655°N 2.04624°W		Mid 18th century	The public house is in rendered stone, with painted stone dressings, and an M-shaped slate roof with gable copings and shaped kneelers. There are three storeys, and fronts of three and two bays. In the centre is a porch, and the windows are mullioned.	II
Kettlewell Bridge; 54.14583°N 2.05101°W		Late 18th century	The bridge carries the B6160 road over the River Wharfe. It is in stone and consists of two segmental arches. There is a large pointed cutwater, pilasters, a projecting band, and a parapet with flat coping. The flanking walls end in square piers.	II
Town Foot Bridge; 54.14678°N 2.04929°W		Late 18th century	The bridge, which carries a road over Kettlewell Beck, is in stone, and consists of a single segmental arch. It is flanked by pilasters, it has a projecting band at road level, and parapets with chamfered coping. The flanking walls end in square piers.	II
Dam Side House, railings, gates and barn 54.14714°N 2.04546°W		1815	The house, which incorporates remains from a house of 1681, is in stone with gritstone dressings, quoins, and a stone slate roof with gable copings and shaped kneelers. There are two storeys and two bays, and a slightly recessed bay on the left. The central doorway has a dated and initialled lintel and a cornice, and the windows are sashes. The barn to the right is whitewashed, and has four bays, a recessed porch and a loading door above. In front of the house is a low coped wall, iron railings with wavy rails and pointed finials, and sandstone gate piers.	II
St Mary's Church; 54.14613°N 2.04532°W		1820	The oldest part of the church is the tower, with the body dating from 1883–85. It is built in stone with a stone slate roof, and consists of a nave, a south porch, a chancel, and a west tower. The tower has three stages, a round-arched south doorway with a keystone, string courses, windows with pointed arches in the middle stage, bell openings with pointed arches and hood moulds in the top stage, and an embattled parapet with corner pinnacles. The windows in the body of the church are in Perpendicular style.	II*
Dam Side Cottage and outbuilding 54.14717°N 2.04517°W		Early 19th century (probable)	The house and attached barn are in limestone, the house whitewashed, with gritstone dressings and stone slate roofs. The house has two storeys and two bays, a central doorway and sshes with plain surrounds. The barn is dated 1835, and projects on the right. It has quoins, and contains a cart entrance with a cambered arch and quoined jambs, above which is a dated plaque, and the windows are sashes.	II
Knipe Scar Limekiln; 54.14136°N 2.04957°W		Early 19th century (probable)	The limekiln is in limestone, it has a square plan, and is built into a hillside. The north side is about 5 metres (16 ft) wide and 4 metres (13 ft) high. On the front is an arch of voussoirs.	II
Coates Lane Farmhouse; 54.16889°N 2.07308°W	—	1829	The farmhouse is in limestone, with quoins, and a stone slate roof with gable copings and shaped kneelers. There are two storeys and fronts of two bays. In the centre is a doorway with a dated lintel and a cornice, and the windows are sashes.	II
Fox and Hounds Public House; 54.16924°N 2.07342°W		1834	The public house is in whitewashed stone, with quoins, and a stone slate roof, hipped on the left, There are two storeys and an L-shaped plan, with two ranges of three bays. The doorway has an architrave with pilasters, a dated entablature, and a cornice, and the windows are sashes in plain surrounds.	II
West Scale Park Farmhouse; 54.16655°N 2.03604°W	—	Early to mid 19th century	The farmhouse is rendered, and has stone dressings, a sill band and a grey slate roof. There are two storeys and fronts of three and two bays. The central doorway has a panelled stone surround, a cornice and a blocking course. The windows are sashes, those in the ground floor in round-arched recesses.	II
Telephone kiosk, Kettleswell; 54.14679°N 2.04906°W		1935	The K6 type telephone kiosk was designed by Giles Gilbert Scott. Constructed in cast iron with a square plan and a dome, it has three unperforated crowns in the top panels.	II
Telephone kiosk, Starbotton; 54.16874°N 2.07356°W		1935	The K6 type telephone kiosk was designed by Giles Gilbert Scott. Constructed in cast iron with a square plan and a dome, it has three unperforated crowns in the top panels.	II
Chapel, Scargill House; 54.13544°N 2.03516°W		1958–61	The chapel, designed by G. G. Pace, is in limestone, with cedar boarding, some exposed concrete, and a highly pitched cedar shingled roof. The gable ends are glazed, with mullions and transoms, and on the sides are vertical slit windows. There is a serpentine link to the vestry containing a staircase.	II*
Marsh Lounge, Scargill House; 54.13524°N 2.03602°W		1964–65	The meeting room, designed by G. G. Pace, is in concrete and limestone, and has an aluminium-clad roof. There is a single storey with a partial basement, and a truncated octagonal plan. On the roof are four dormers forming a Cross pattée plan, and around the sides are tall picture windows.	II
