= Comiston =

Suburb of Edinburgh, Scotland

Coordinates: 55°54′37.28″N 3°12′49.07″W

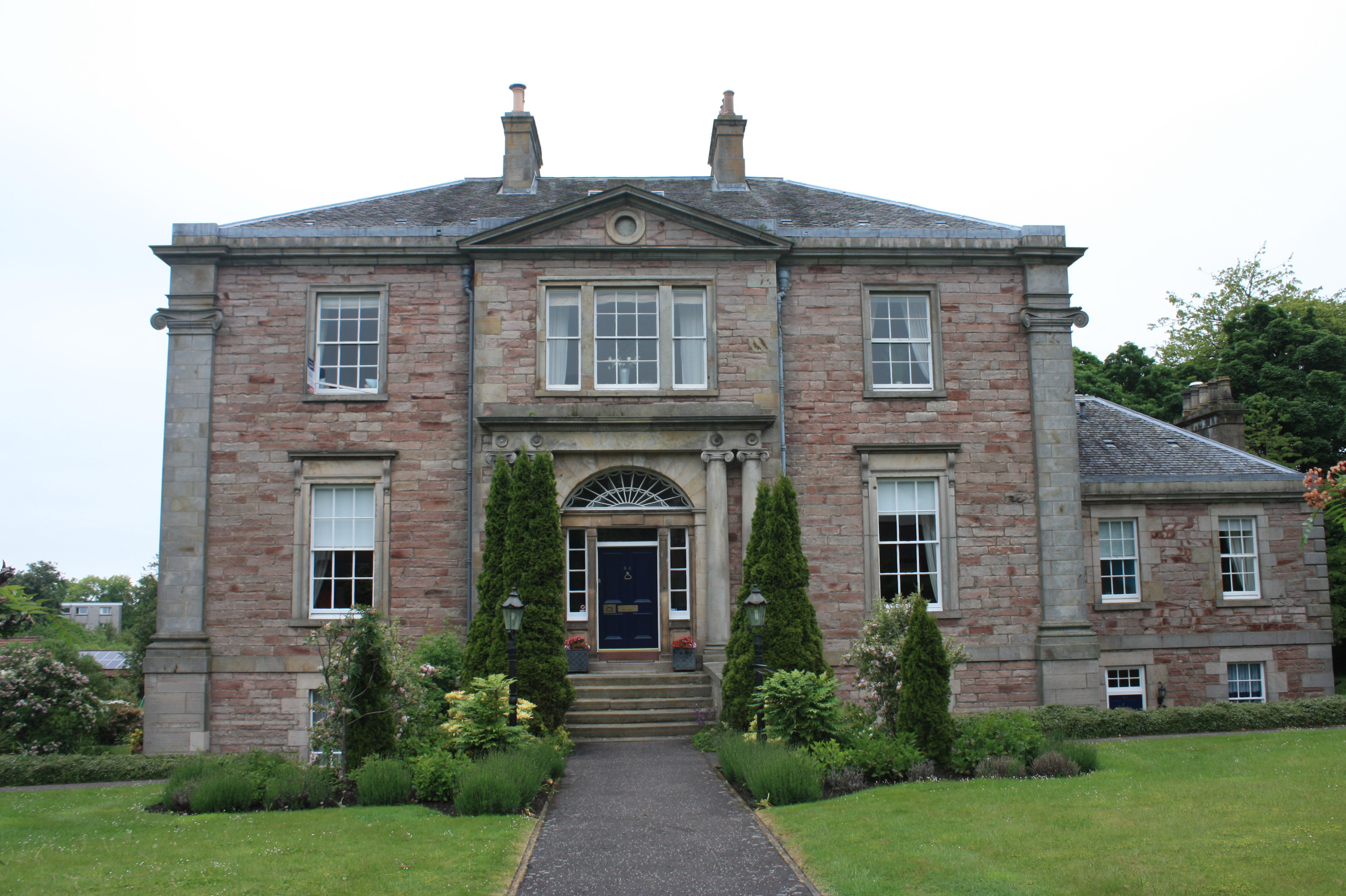
Comiston House, Camus Avenue, Edinburgh

Comiston (Scottish Gaelic: Baile Chaluim, IPA:[ˈpaleˈxaɫ̪ɯim]) is a suburb of Edinburgh, the capital of Scotland. It is south of Morningside and west of the Braid Hills, linking the suburbs of Oxgangs and Fairmilehead.

The main road through the area, Comiston Road, is a continuation of Morningside Road, and further south becomes Biggar Road. It is classified as the A702 which runs eventually to Biggar. A part of Comiston Road has signage as Pentland Terrace, the name of a terrace of Victorian houses set back from, and above Comiston Road, with a roadway of its own immediately in front of the houses.

Comiston House was owned by the Forrest baronets. Sir James Forrest, 1st Baronet, Lord Provost of Edinburgh, occupied it from 1837 to 1843. Its grounds now form Fairmilehead Public Park.

== History ==
A great battle was fought here in prehistoric times, resulting in two large burial cairns (presumably housing the dead of the two opposing sides). These two cairns were raided and destroyed in the early 19th century by workers seeking material with which to create the new metalling on the toll roads. A commemorative stone remained as a memorial, 20 feet high, this was called the Camus stone, after Camus the Danish commander of one army. This name, Camus stone, was corrupted into "Comiston".

From 1680, waters were piped from Comiston Springs to the city centre and it was critical to the area's water supply.
