= Sir James Forrest, 1st Baronet =

Scottish baronet and Whig politician

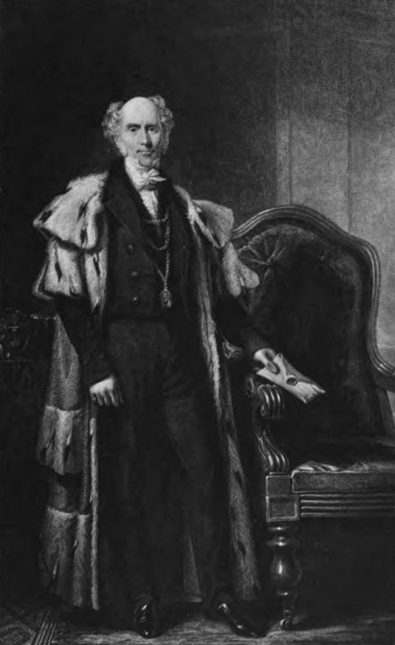
Sir James Forrest, Lord Provost of Edinburgh

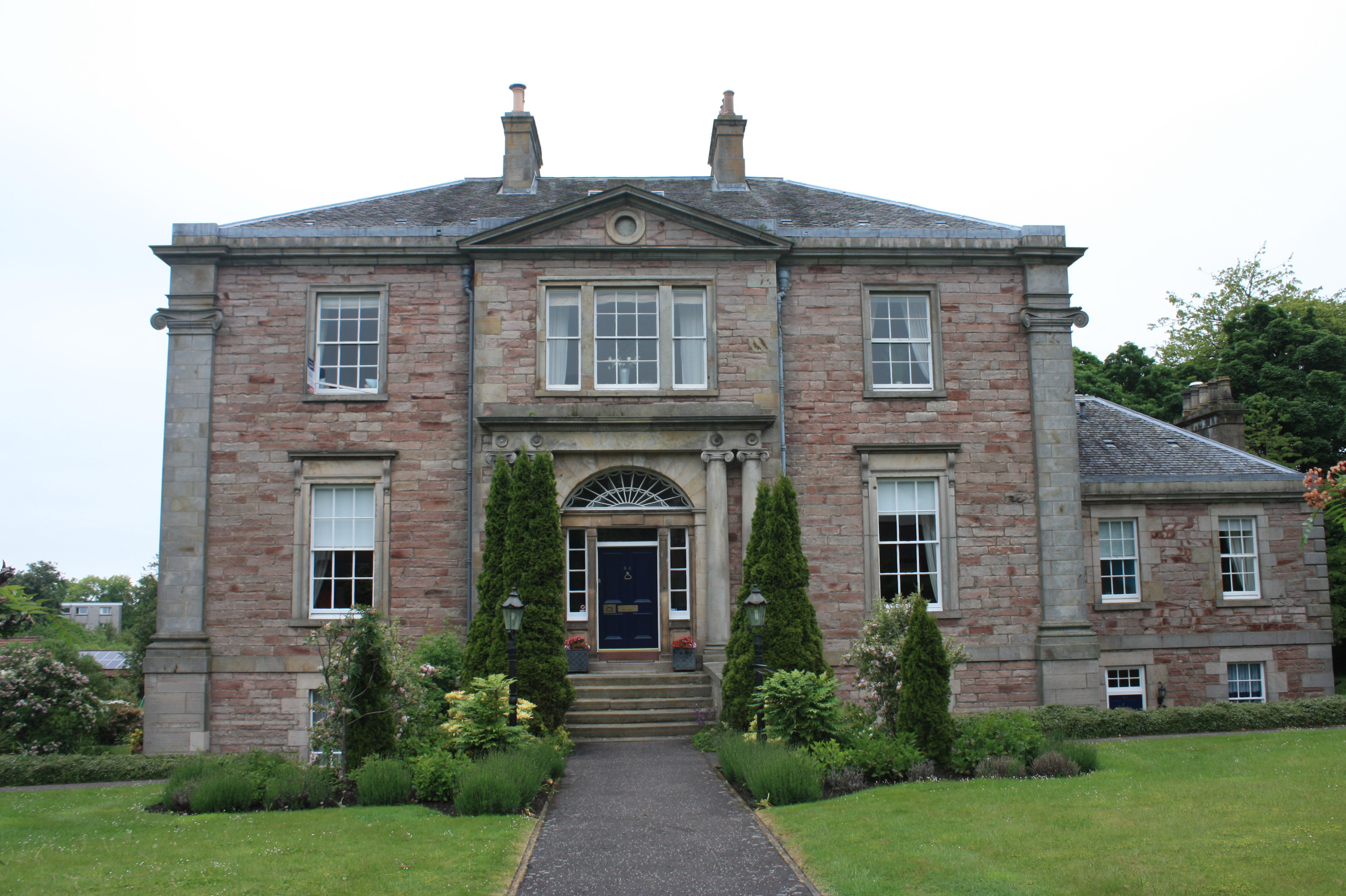
Comiston House, Camus Avenue, Edinburgh

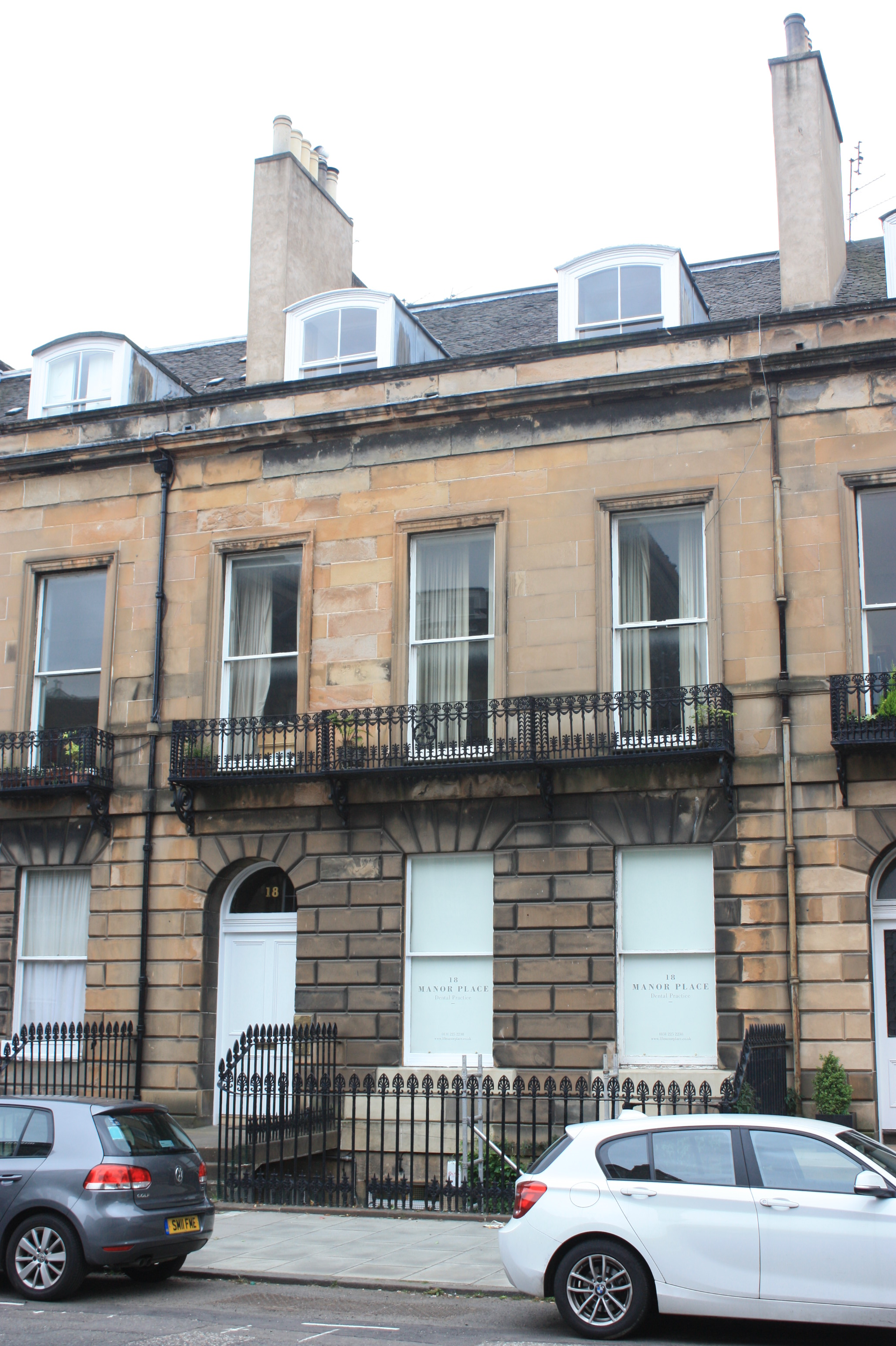
18 Manor Place, Edinburgh

Sir James Forrest, 1st Baronet of Comiston FRSE (1780-1860) was a Scottish baronet and Whig politician who served as Lord Provost of Edinburgh 1837–1843. The family crest is three oak trees. Forrest Road in Edinburgh is named in his honour.

== Life ==
He was born in Edinburgh on 16 October 1780 the son of James Forrest WS (1744-1820) a lawyer (son of John Forrest (1704-1778) of Grange House in Edinburgh). His mother was Katharine Forrest, the only daughter of James Forrest of Comiston, cousin to his father. She died when he was two years old, and he inherited the large estate of Comiston House. He attended the high school then studied law at the University of Edinburgh. He was created an advocate in 1803.

He was elected Lord Provost of Edinburgh in 1837, succeeding Sir James Spittal. He was created a baronet in 1838 by Queen Victoria during his period as Lord Provost. In 1842 he was elected a Fellow of the Royal Society of Edinburgh.

Controversially having served as the Ruling Elder of the Church of Scotland at the Disruption of 1843 he left the established church to join the Free Church of Scotland in the Disruption of 1843. He had previously (1838 to 1840) been Grand Master of the Grand Lodge of Freemasons of Scotland.

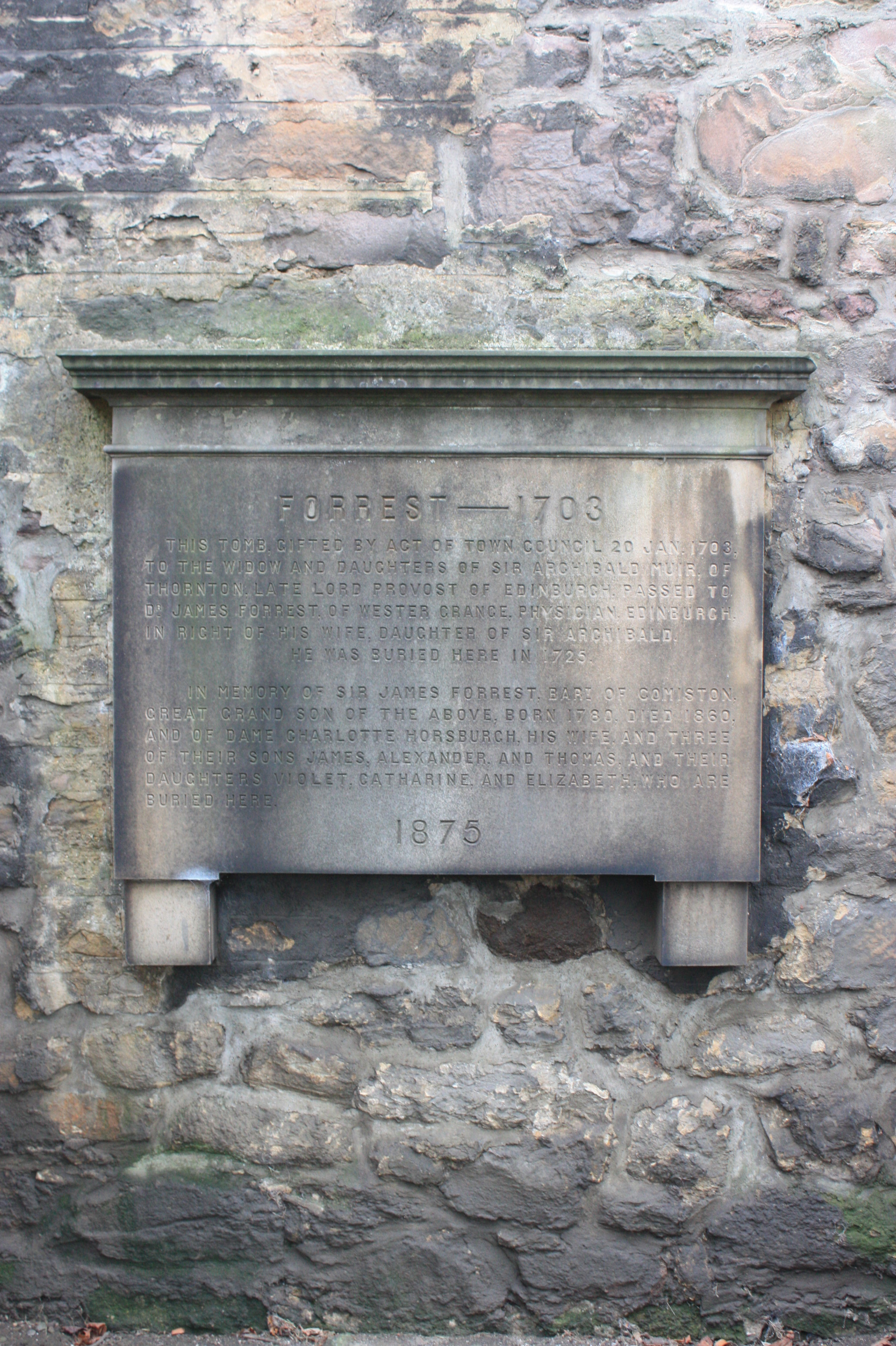
The grave of Sir James Forrest, Greyfriars Kirkyard

His home in later life was 18 Manor Place in Edinburgh's West End, a substantial terraced townhouse. He continued to also own the large country mansion of Comiston House.

He died whilst on a visit to Plymouth on 5 April 1860 and was returned to Edinburgh for burial in Greyfriars Kirkyard.

== Family ==
In 1810 he married Charlotte Horsburgh (d.1852).

Their children included Sir John Forrest (1817-1883) 2nd baronet and Sir William Forrest (1823-1894) 3rd baronet. Thomas (b.1815) died young. Daughters included Violet (b.1820) and Catherine (b.1825). His youngest daughter, Elizabeth Charlotte Forrest (b.1827) died in Clifton near Bristol in 1858.

Masonic offices
Preceded by Lord Ramsay	Grand Master of the Grand Lodge of Scotland; 1838–1840	Succeeded by The Earl of Rothes
Baronetage of the United Kingdom
New creation	Baronet (of Comiston); 1838–1860	Succeeded by John Forrest
