= Forrest baronets =

Extinct baronetcy in the Baronetage of the United Kingdom

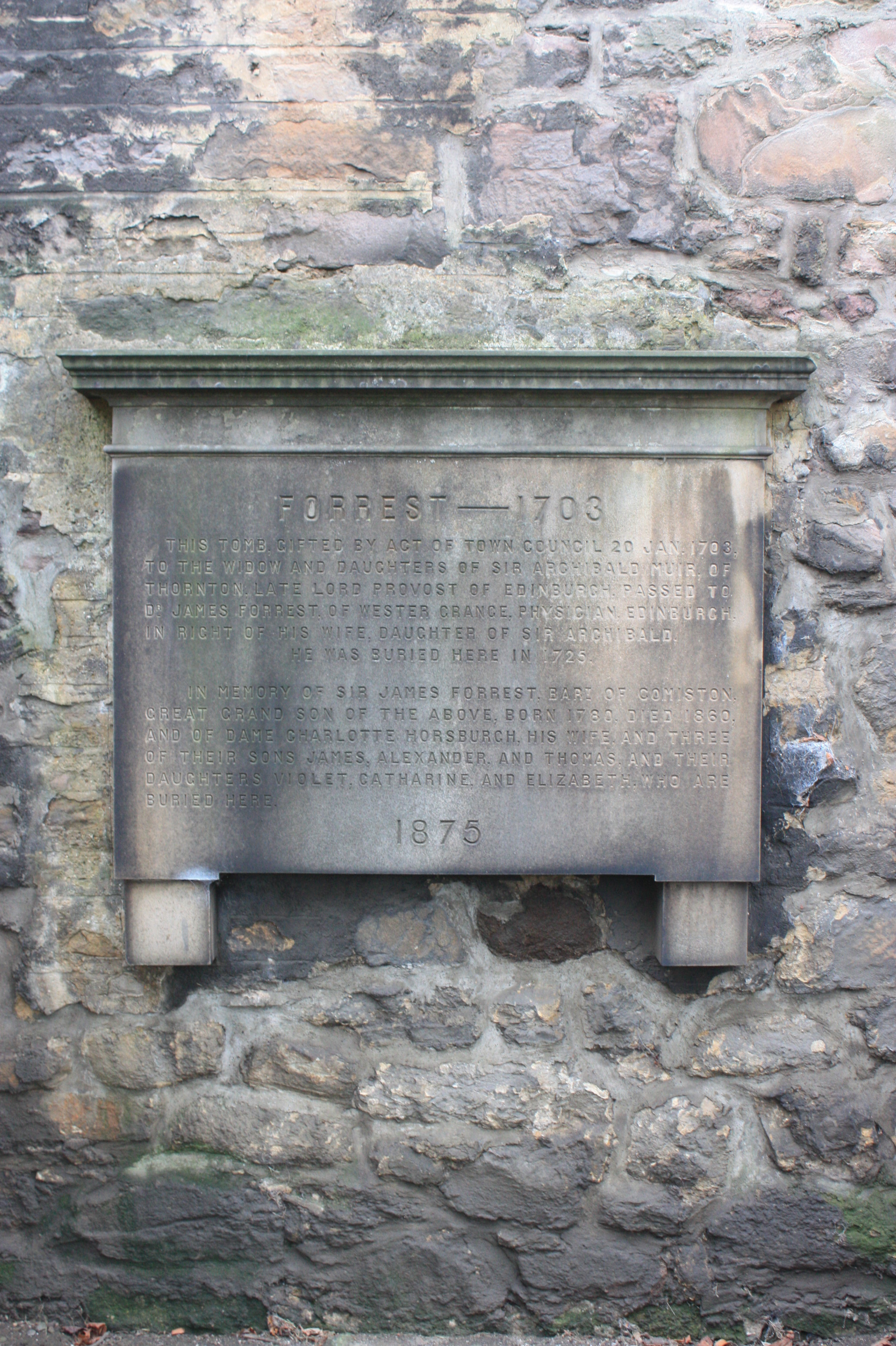
The grave of Sir James Forrest, Greyfriars Kirkyard

The Forrest Baronetcy, of Comiston (a suburb of Edinburgh) in the County of Midlothian, was a title in the Baronetage of the United Kingdom. It was created on 7 August 1838 for James Forrest, Lord Provost of Edinburgh. The title became extinct on the death of the fifth Baronet in 1928.

== Forrest baronets, of Comiston (1838) ==
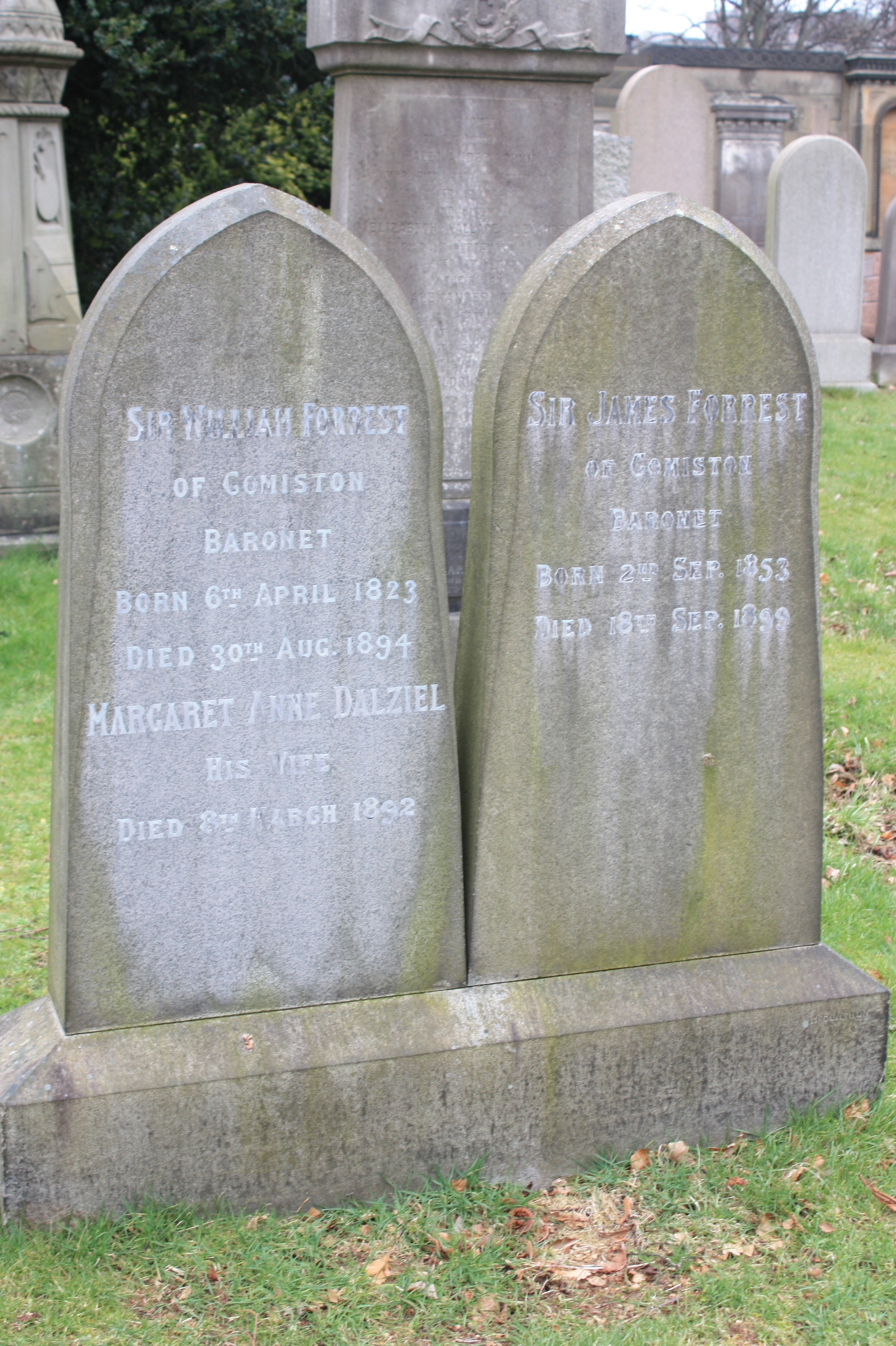
The graves of Sir William Forrest and Sir James Forrest, Dean Cemetery

- Sir James Forrest, 1st Baronet (1780–1860), advocate (1803) and Lord Provost of Edinburgh (1837–43) (after whom Forrest Road was named)
- Sir John Forrest, 2nd Baronet (1817–1883)
- Sir William Forrest, 3rd Baronet (1823–1894)
- Sir James Forrest, 4th Baronet (1853–1899)
- Sir William Charles Forrest, 5th Baronet (1857–1928)

== Memorials ==
A marble bust of Sir James Forrest (1780–1860) by Peter Slater is held in New College, Edinburgh.

Forrest Road in Edinburgh was named during his time as Lord Provost.

Baronetage of the United Kingdom
Preceded by Jephson-Norreys baronets	Forrest baronets of Comiston; 7 August 1838	Succeeded by Roche baronets
