= Robert Spittal =

Scottish physician and amateur botanist

Robert Spittal MD FRSE (1804–1852) was a 19th-century Scottish medical doctor and amateur botanist.

== Life ==
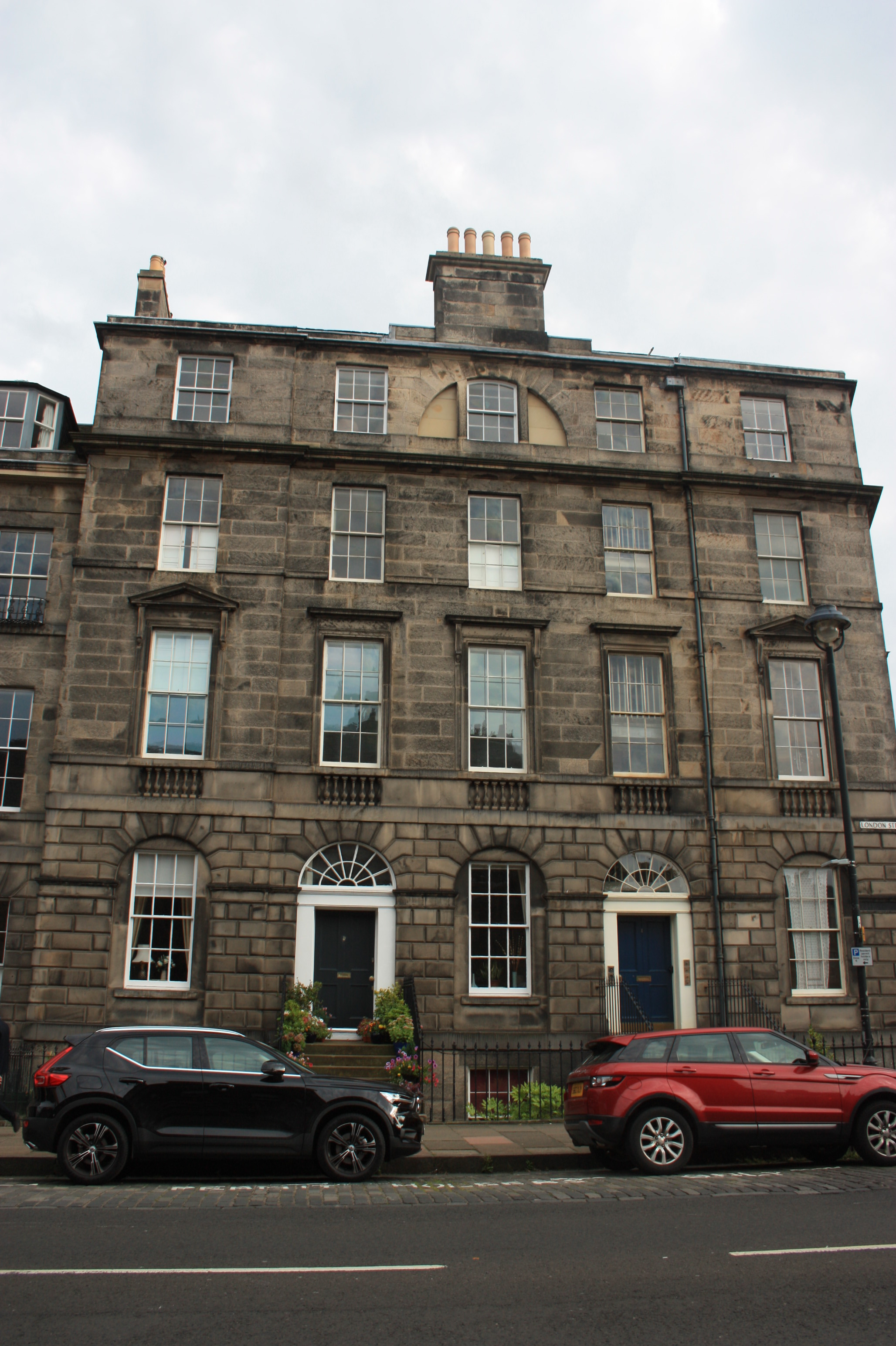
1 and 3 London Street, Edinburgh

Spittal was born 9 January 1804 to Marion Brown and Sir James Spittal. The family moved to 59 South Bridge in Edinburgh's Old Town in 1810.

He studied medicine at the University of Edinburgh and became an assistant physician at the Edinburgh Royal Infirmary. In 1829 he was President of the Edinburgh Plinian Natural History Society and President of the Royal Medical Society in 1833.

He undertook further postgraduate studies in Germany and received his doctorate (MD) from the University of Giessen in 1838. On his return he began lecturing in Medical Acoustics at the University of Edinburgh and from 1839 also lectured at Edinburgh's Extra Mural School. He was elected a Fellow of the Royal College of Physicians of Edinburgh. Spittal was appointed Physician to the Queen in Scotland.

He carried out research on the origins of breath sounds and how these should be interpreted by auscultation.

In 1840 he was living at a flat at 7 Nelson Street.

In 1841 he was elected a Fellow of the Royal Society of Edinburgh. His proposer was Sir Robert Christison.

He died at home 3 London Street in Edinburgh's Second New Town on 7 April 1852. He is buried next to his parents in Greyfriars Kirkyard.
