= Kettlewell with Starbotton =

Civil parish in North Yorkshire, England

Coordinates: 54.1585°N 2.0615°W

- Civil parish
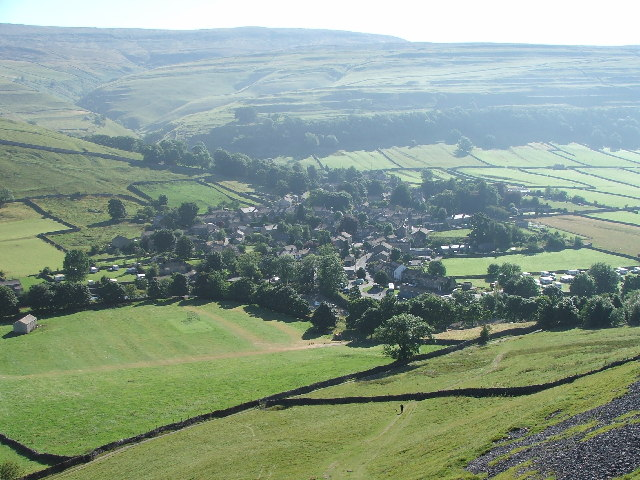
- Kettlewell

- Population: 322 (2011 census)
- OS grid reference: SD960736
- Civil parish: Kettlewell with Starbotton
- Unitary authority: North Yorkshire
- Ceremonial county: North Yorkshire
- Region: Yorkshire and the Humber
- Country: England
- Sovereign state: United Kingdom
- Post town: SKIPTON
- Postcode district: BD23
- Police: North Yorkshire
- Fire: North Yorkshire
- Ambulance: Yorkshire
- UK Parliament: Skipton and Ripon

Kettlewell with Starbotton is a civil parish in the county of North Yorkshire, England.

Kettlewell is a village in Upper Wharfedale, North Yorkshire, England. It lies between the villages of Grassington, Kilnsey and Conistone to the south, Starbotton to the northwest, the hamlet of Horsehouse to the northeast, and later on Coverdale. Kettlewell nestles at the feet of Great Whernside, and Buckden Pike, where Park Gill Beck joins the River Wharfe, and set to the east of the Wharfe. Both river and beck are joined by attractive stone bridges there.

Starbotton is a hamlet of around 70 houses situated in the Yorkshire Dales National Park, by the River Wharfe in Wharfedale. The resident population is only around 75 with many of the village houses being used as holiday accommodation. There are only two remaining working farms - one at either end of the village, the rest having been converted in one way or another. It is on the opposite bank of the River Wharfe to the Dales Way halfway between Kettlewell and Buckden.

Until 1974 it was part of the West Riding of Yorkshire. From 1974 to 2023 it was part of the Craven District, it is now administered by the unitary North Yorkshire Council.

== See also ==
- Listed buildings in Kettlewell with Starbotton
