= Queen Charlotte's Ball =

English debutante ball

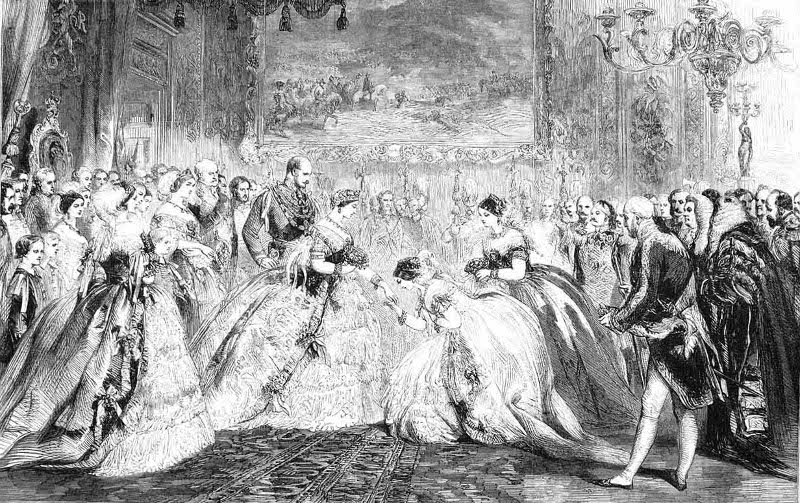
Debutantes being presented in 1860 at court

The Queen Charlotte's Ball is an annual British debutante ball. The ball was founded in 1780 by George III as a birthday celebration in honour of his wife, Charlotte of Mecklenburg-Strelitz, for whom the ball is named. The Queen Charlotte's Ball originally served as a fundraiser for the Queen Charlotte's and Chelsea Hospital. The annual ball continued after Queen Charlotte's death in 1818, but was criticised by the British royal family in the 1950s and 1960s and folded in 1976.

It was revived in the 21st century by Jennie Hallam-Peel, a former debutante, who shifted its focus from entering high society to teaching business skills, networking, and etiquette, and fundraising for charities. Debutantes being presented curtsey to a large birthday cake in honour of the ball's origin as a birthday celebration.

== History ==
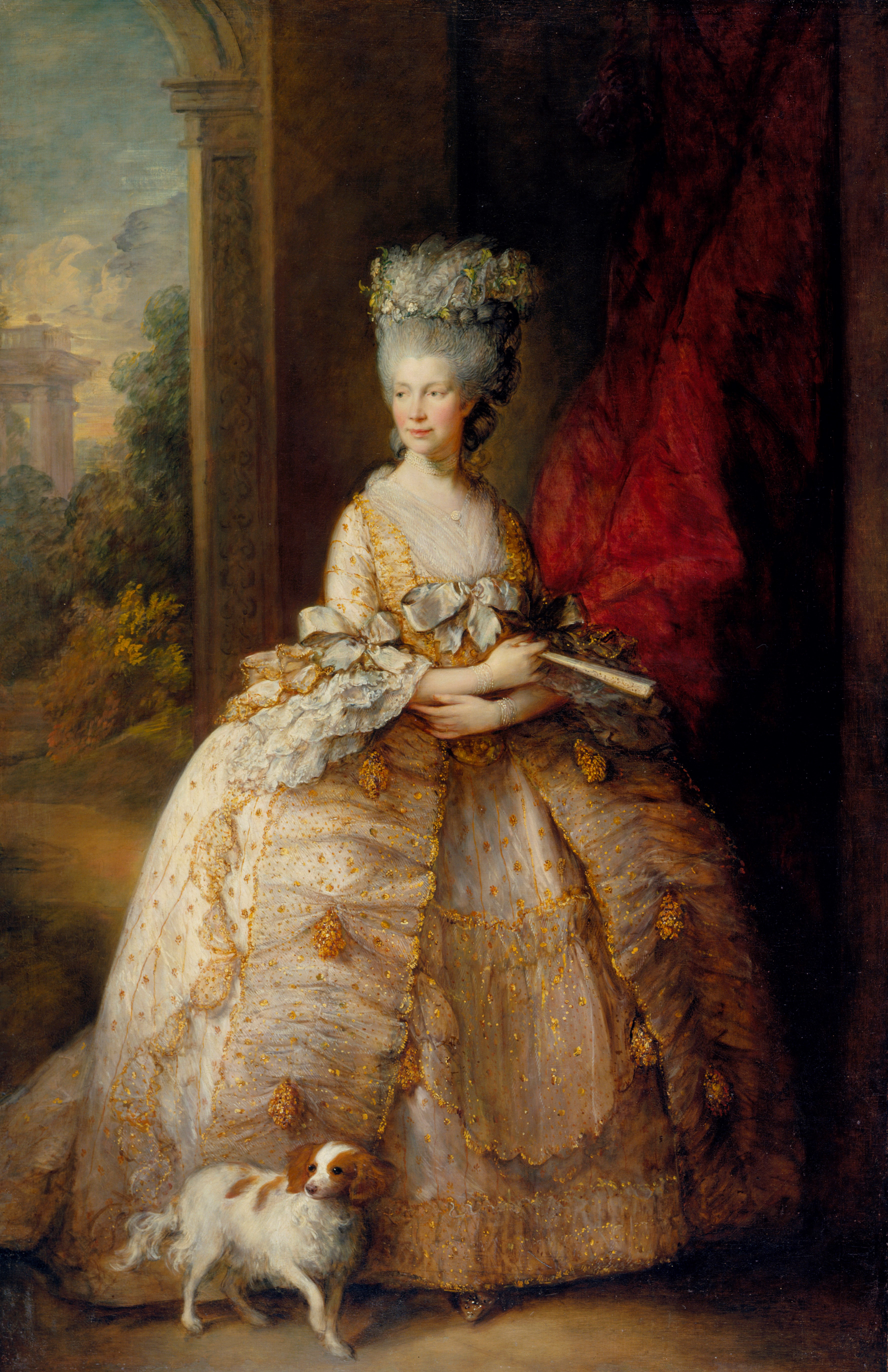
Portrait of Queen Charlotte, by Thomas Gainsborough, 1781

The Queen Charlotte's Ball is named after Charlotte of Mecklenburg-Strelitz. The first ball was hosted in 1780 by Charlotte's husband, King George III, in honour of her birthday. The Queen stood next to a giant birthday cake and debutantes curtseyed to her. Charlotte of Mecklenburg-Strelitz funded a London women's hospital, later named the Queen Charlotte's and Chelsea Hospital, with funds raised from the ball. The ball, which continued to take place annually in celebration of the queen's birthday, became the premier debutante ball of the London Season.

After Queen Charlotte's death in 1818, the ball continued to be hosted by the British sovereign and consort. Young women from noble and gentry families were presented as debutantes to the royal court. After being presented at court, debutantes were allowed to partake in all the exclusive social diversions of high society: attending parties, balls, and horse races, and being eligible for marriage. Debutantes presented at Queen Charlotte's Ball would curtsey to the reigning sovereign as he or she stood beside a large birthday cake.

In the late 1950s the Duke of Edinburgh referred to the ball as "bloody daft" and insisted that it no longer be held at Buckingham Palace. Princess Margaret reportedly disapproved of the ball (she is said to have complained that: "Every tart in London is getting in"), particularly that candidates were bribing former debutantes to sponsor them, as a sponsorship was required in order to participate. In 1958 Elizabeth II announced she would no longer have debutantes presented at court. In the 1960s and 1970s the participation in debutante balls around the United Kingdom dropped, leading to the Queen Charlotte's Ball folding in 1976.

== 21st-century revival ==
The Queen Charlotte's Ball was revived in the early 21st century by Jennie Hallam-Peel, a former debutante, who works as an attorney and runs a company called The London Season. Peter Townend, social editor of Tatler, reportedly asked Hallam-Peel to "keep the Season alive" prior to his death in 2001. She began touring London's elite private day schools and selecting students as debutante recruits.

The modern ball's focus shifted from entering high society to teaching business skills, networking, etiquette, and fundraising for charities. While originally exclusive to members of the British nobility and gentry, the ball now includes debutantes from the British upper middle class and from foreign countries. Many debutantes are from Eastern Europe and Asia. Debutantes are required to be preparing for or already enrolled at a university. The debutantes are also required to partake in the traditional London season, including the Henley Royal Regatta, Royal Ascot, and the Glyndebourne Festival Opera. They are trained in etiquette that involves protocol and diplomacy, foreign orders of precedence and the orders of precedence in the United Kingdom, seating arrangements, invitations, gifts, titles and forms of address, flag protocol, honours and decorations, and ranks of the British peerage.

The ball, no longer hosted by the monarch, is officially hosted by John Seymour, 19th Duke of Somerset and Judith-Rose, Duchess of Somerset with Princess Katarina of Yugoslavia and Princess Olga Andreevna Romanoff serving as royal patrons. Murray Beauclerk, 14th Duke of St Albans; Gillian Beauclerk, Duchess of St Albans; Sir David O'Grady Roche, 5th Baronet; and The Honourable Lady Roche have also served as hosts for the ball and Prince Nawab Mohsin Ali Khan has served as a royal patron.

Rather than curtsey to a monarch, the debutantes curtsey to the birthday cake itself. Each year one debutante is selected as "Debutante of the Year" and she cuts the cake with a ceremonial sword.

Since its revival, the ball has been hosted at Dartmouth House, Leeds Castle, Kensington Palace, and the Royal Courts of Justice.

The Queen Charlotte's Ball partnered with the Shanghai International Debutante Ball to organise its events from 2012 until 2016.

== In popular culture ==
Fiona MacCarthy wrote about her experiences as one of the last 1,400 debutantes to be presented at court in her 2006 book Last Curtsey: The End of the Debutantes.

The Queen Charlotte's ball has also been referenced and depicted in film and television.

- The 1958 American comedy The Reluctant Debutante is about a young American woman making her debut in the London season.
- The ball is depicted in the 2010 British drama series Upstairs Downstairs, when the character Lady Persephone Towyn moved from Wales to London to be presented as a debutante.
- The Ball is featured in the series Downton Abbey (Season 4 Special, 2013) when the Crawleys visit London for the debut of their cousin, Lady Rose MacClare.
- In the 2016 series The Crown, the ball is included in a list of recommendations made to Queen Elizabeth II of things to cancel, by Lord Altrincham in 1957.
- Stephen Poliakoff's 2019 television mini-series Summer of Rockets, set during the Cold War, features a leading character's daughter attending the ball reluctantly, creating a minor scene by refusing to curtsey to the cake as expected.
- The ball is featured in the 2020 Netflix original series Bridgerton.
