= St Mary's Church, Kettlewell =

Church in Kettlewell, North Yorkshire, England

Coordinates: 54°08′46″N 2°02′43″W

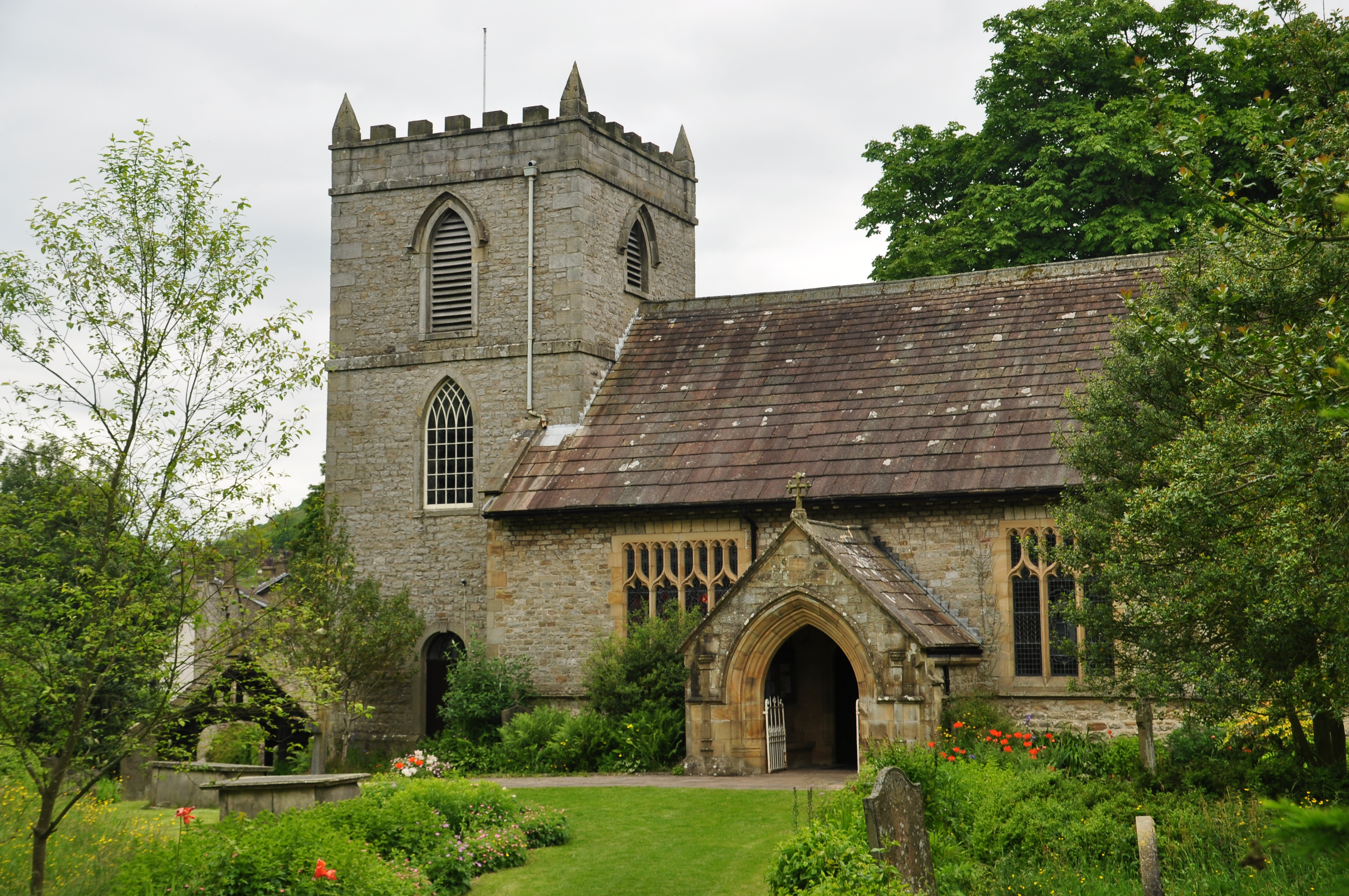
The church, in 2016

St Mary's Church is the parish church of Kettlewell, a village in North Yorkshire, in England.

There was a church in Kettlewell in the mediaeval period, but it was entirely rebuilt in 1820. Between 1882 and 1885, the nave and chancel were again rebuilt, to a design by T. H. and F. Healey. The building was grade II* listed in 1954.

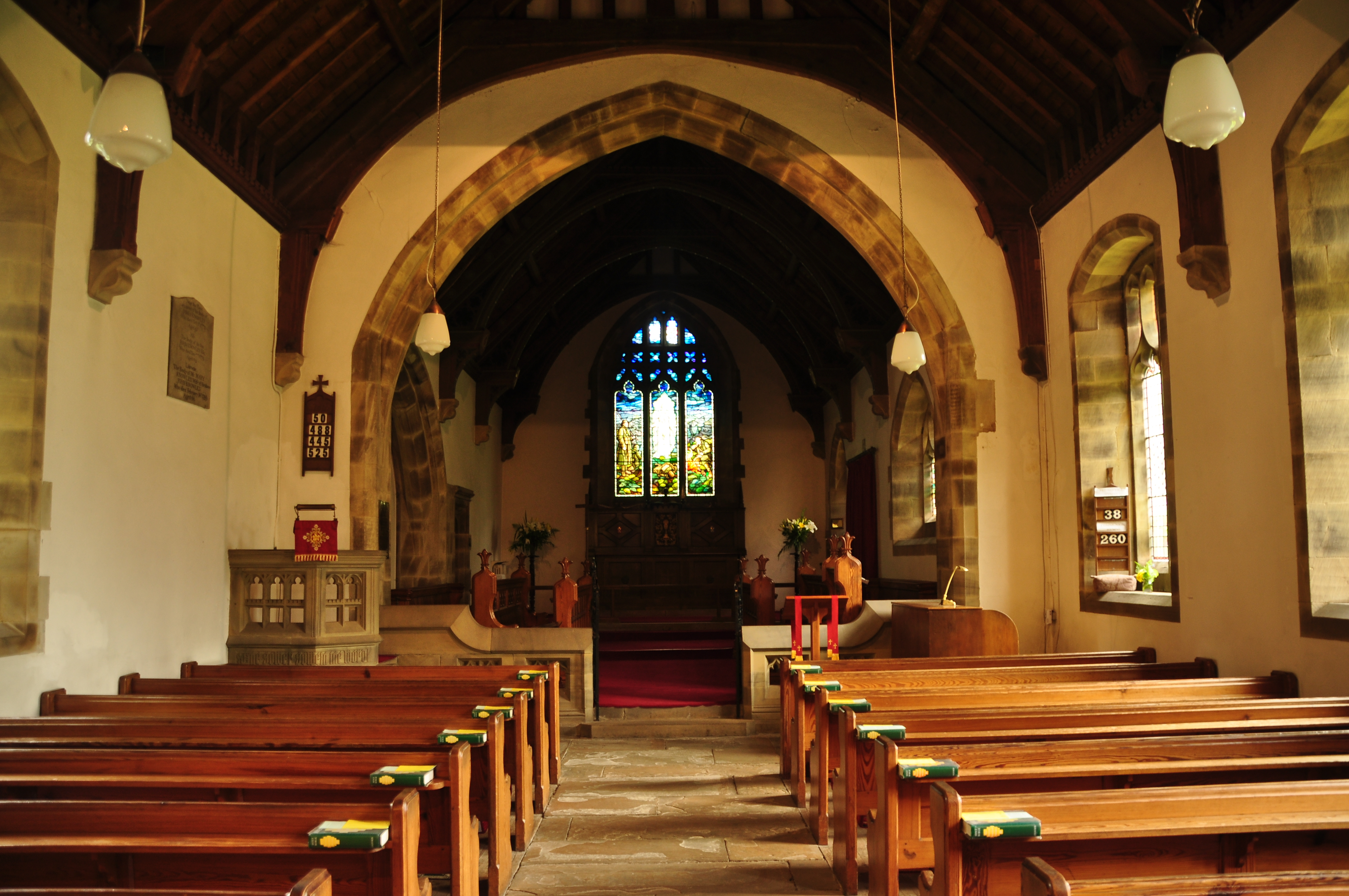
View from the nave into the chancel

The church is built of stone with a stone slate roof, and consists of a nave, a south porch, a chancel, and a west tower. The tower has three stages, a round-arched south doorway with a keystone, string courses, windows with pointed arches in the middle stage, bell openings with pointed arches and hood moulds in the top stage, and an embattled parapet with corner pinnacles. The windows in the body of the church are in Perpendicular style. Three have mid-20th century stained glass. The font is probably early 12th century and came from the earlier church.

== See also ==
- Grade II* listed churches in North Yorkshire (district)
- Listed buildings in Kettlewell with Starbotton
