= Standish O'Grady Roche =

Royal Navy officer from Ireland (1911–1977)

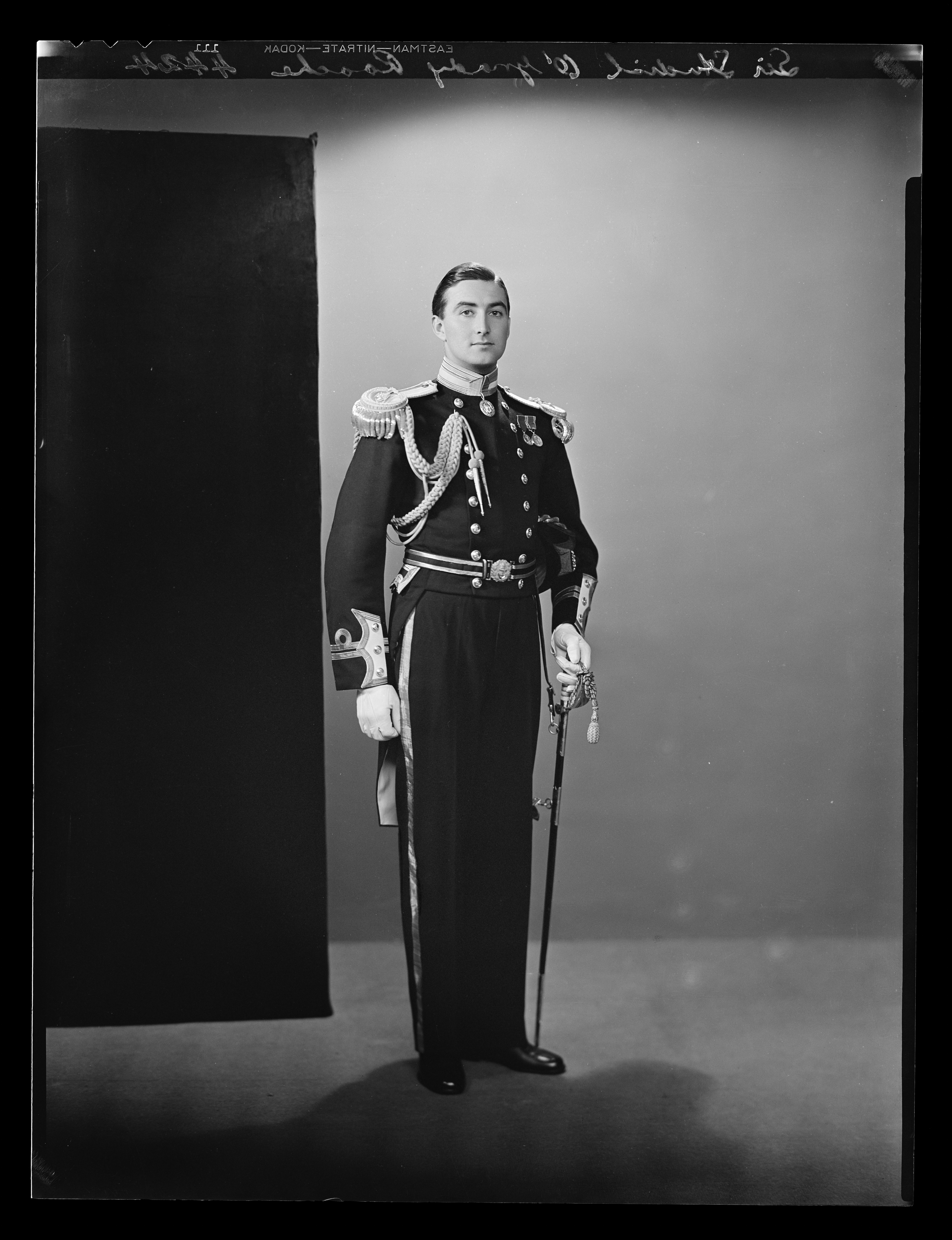
Sir Standish O'Grady Roche, 1937, Wellington, by Spencer Digby Studios. Spencer Digby / Ronald D Woolf Collection. Gift of Ronald Woolf, 1975. Te Papa (C.021158)

Sir Standish O'Grady Roche, 4th Baronet, DSO (or Standish O'Grady-Roche) (13 March 1911 – 2 April 1977) of Ireland, was commanding officer of the destroyer HMS Beaufort in the World War II Second Battle of Sirte on 22 March 1942.

He became baronet on 9 December 1914 at the age of 3 on the death of his father Standish Dean O'Grady Roche. His mother was Cecilia, daughter of Henry Dean O'Grady of Lodge, County Limerick, Stillorgan Castle, County Dublin, and Merrion Square.

He earned the Distinguished Service Order and Croix de Guerre while protecting convoys near Malta.

He also served as aide-de-camp to the Governor-General of New Zealand through January 1938 while a Royal Navy lieutenant.

== Family life and succession ==
He was married in Malta on 9 February 1946 to Evelyn Laura Andon (3rd Officer, WRNS), daughter of Major William Valentine Hoskins Andon. At the time of his marriage he was a lieutenant commander. They had two sons. Lady Roche died in 2019.

He sold the family's Carlow estate in 1968.

He was succeeded as baronet by his elder son.

Baronetage of the United Kingdom
Preceded by Standish O'Grady Roche	Baronet (of Carass, Limerick); 1914–1977	Succeeded by David O'Grady Roche
