= Kettlewell =

Village in North Yorkshire, England

Coordinates: 54°08′49″N 2°02′49″W

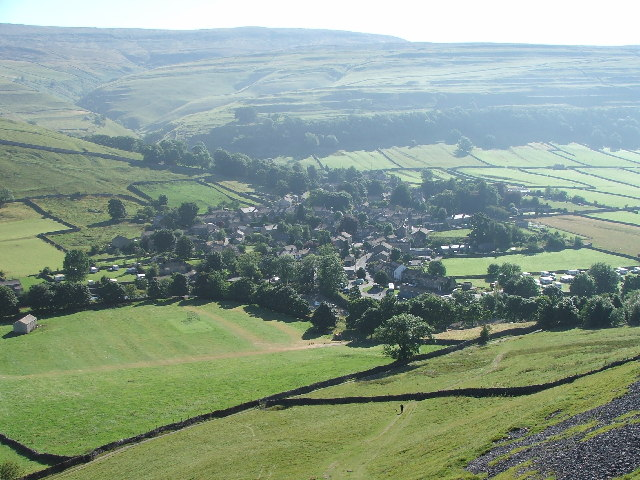
- Kettlewell

- Location within North Yorkshire
- Population: 321
- OS grid reference: SD969723
- Civil parish: Kettlewell with Starbotton
- Unitary authority: North Yorkshire
- Ceremonial county: North Yorkshire
- Region: Yorkshire and the Humber
- Country: England
- Sovereign state: United Kingdom
- Post town: SKIPTON
- Postcode district: BD23
- Dialling code: 01756
- Police: North Yorkshire
- Fire: North Yorkshire
- Ambulance: Yorkshire
- UK Parliament: Skipton and Ripon

Kettlewell is a village in Upper Wharfedale, North Yorkshire, England. It lies 6 miles (10 km) north of Grassington, at the point where Wharfedale is joined by a minor road (Cam Gill Road) which leads north-east from the village over Park Rash Pass to Coverdale. Great Whernside rises to the east. The population of the civil parish (Kettlewell with Starbotton) was 322 at the 2011 census, with an estimated population of 340 in 2015. The population was recorded as being at 321 according to the United Kingdom 2021 census.

Until 1974 it was part of the West Riding of Yorkshire. From 1974 to 2023 it was part of the Craven District, it is now administered by the unitary North Yorkshire Council.

== History ==
It is believed that the name Kettlewell is Anglo Saxon and comes from Chetelewelle which means a bubbling spring or stream. Signs of the farming methods of Romano-British and early medieval agriculture can still be seen in terraced fields to the north and the south of the village.

In the 13th century, a Thursday market was established in Kettlewell, which became a thriving community. The market mostly sold corn, and was held in the square opposite The King's Head Inn. A watermill was built on the River Wharfe in the 13th century to grind corn. Textiles (and, in the late 18th and early 19th centuries, lead mining) revitalised the village and Kettlewell's appearance today derives much from its past 200 years. The remains of the smelting-mill, used from 1700 to 1880, can be seen near the meeting of Cam Gill and Dowber Gill Becks half a mile above the village.

In 1686 Kettlewell and Starbotton were almost destroyed in a flood. Heavy rainfall descended on the adjacent hills and cascaded down into the village demolishing several houses and causing the residents to flee.

On 5 July 2014, the Tour de France Stage 1 from Leeds to Harrogate passed through the village.

== Governance ==
The village is in the parliamentary constituency of Skipton and Ripon; the seat has been held by the Conservative Party ever since its creation in 1983.

== Geography ==
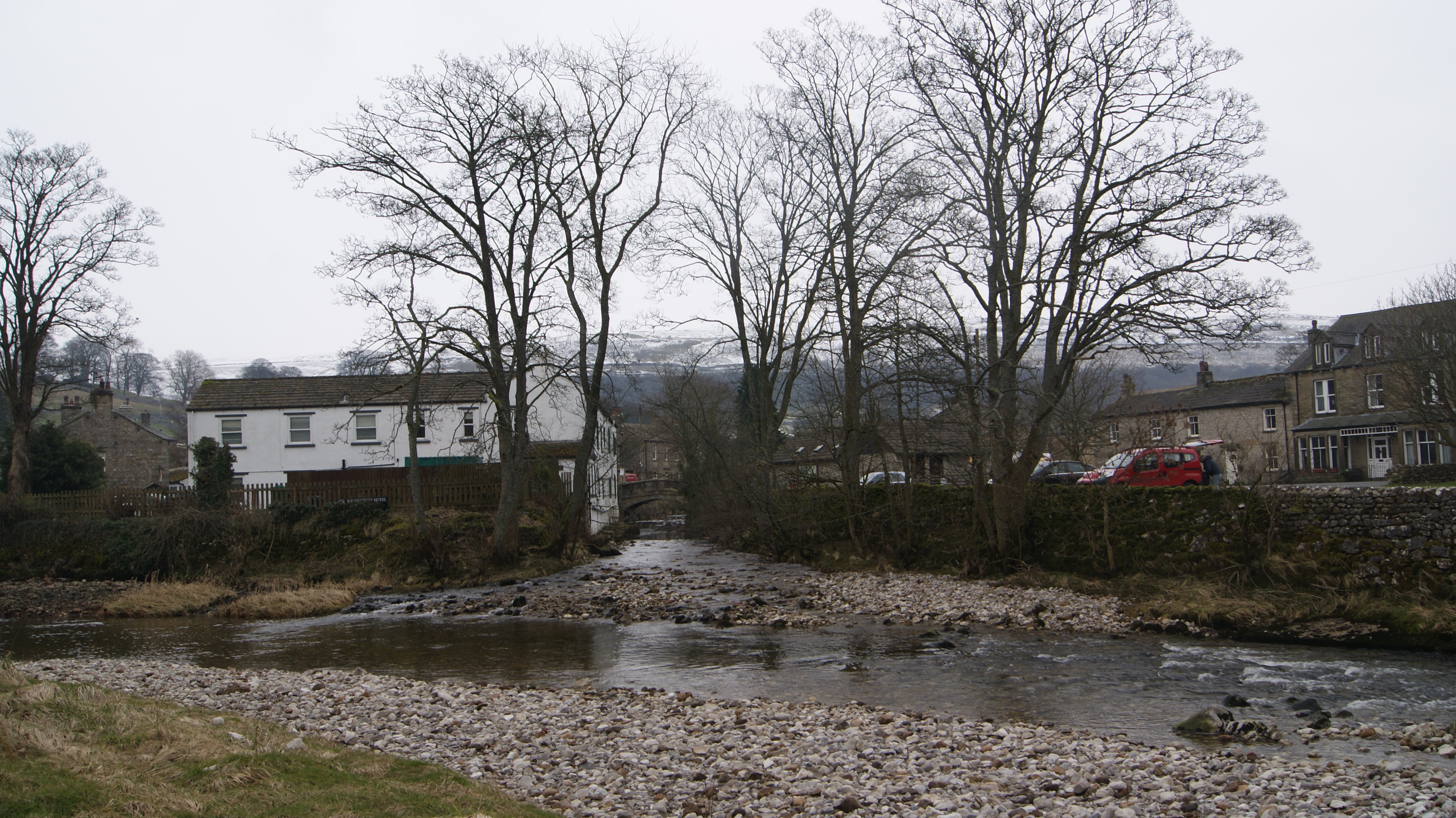
Kettlewell Beck joins the River Wharfe in Kettlewell.

Kettlewell is situated in Upper Wharfedale around two miles upstream of where it converges with Littondale. The B6160 crosses the River Wharfe by a stone bridge. The village is situated just west of the confluence of Dowber Gill Beck and Cam Gill Beck, which join to form Kettlewell Beck flowing through the village to join the River Wharfe. There are many small bridges across Kettlewell Beck which dissect the village.

== Economy ==
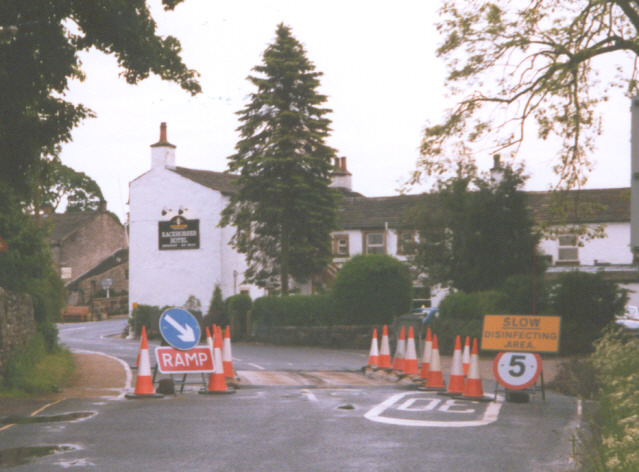
A disinfectant-bath in Kettlewell during the 2001 United Kingdom foot-and-mouth outbreak.

Historically Kettlewell's economy revolved around lead mining and farming. Farming was adversely affected by the 2001 foot-and-mouth outbreak. There are several farms which mostly rely on sheep farming. There is a small service economy serving village residents, tourists and walkers. Kettlewell is on the Dales Way and is a popular starting point for ascents of Great Whernside and Buckden Pike. Rights of way connect the village to Nidderdale and Arncliffe in Littondale. The three village pubs are on the Inn Way and the Racehorses Hotel, the Bluebell Inn and the King's Head all provide accommodation. In addition to the three inns, there are numerous guesthouses, holiday cottages and a village shop, a tasting deli, two cafés and a filling station with a mechanic's garage. There is a large YDNPA car park and the National Park Authority operates public conveniences adjacent to the main car park.

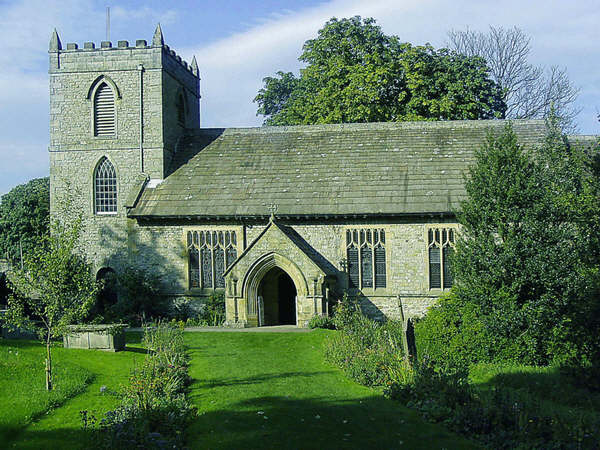
St Mary's Church

The village has 17th and 18th century houses, including the vicarage. St Mary's Church, Kettlewell was rebuilt during the 19th century and stands on a site that dates back to 1120 when the (Norman) de Arches family established a church here. An example of 20th century architecture is the 1960s-built chapel at Scargill House, which is now a Christian conference centre.

== Transport ==
Kettlewell is connected by bus to Skipton, Grassington and Buckden. The village is the northern starting point of the 104-mile (167 km) Yorkshire Water Way to Langsett Reservoir in South Yorkshire. Kettlewell lies on the Dales Way footpath.

== Fauna and flora ==
The area is known for Swaledale Sheep which are extensively farmed in the area. There are deer in the area, though these are rarely sighted. There are areas of forestland to the south-east of the village, while the open valley to the north has little tree cover.

== Events ==
In August the village hosts a scarecrow festival where scarecrows, dressed up as different characters, are placed around the village.

== Popular culture ==
- A children's television character from The Rottentrolls takes its name from the village.
- The 1991 series Chimera was mostly filmed in the village.
- Kettlewell represented the village of Knapely in the 2003 film, Calendar Girls.
- The 2010 film The Trip includes a musical song and dance routine in the village.
- The 2025 film The Ceremony, was filmed partially around Kettlewell.

== See also ==
- Listed buildings in Kettlewell with Starbotton

== Gallery ==
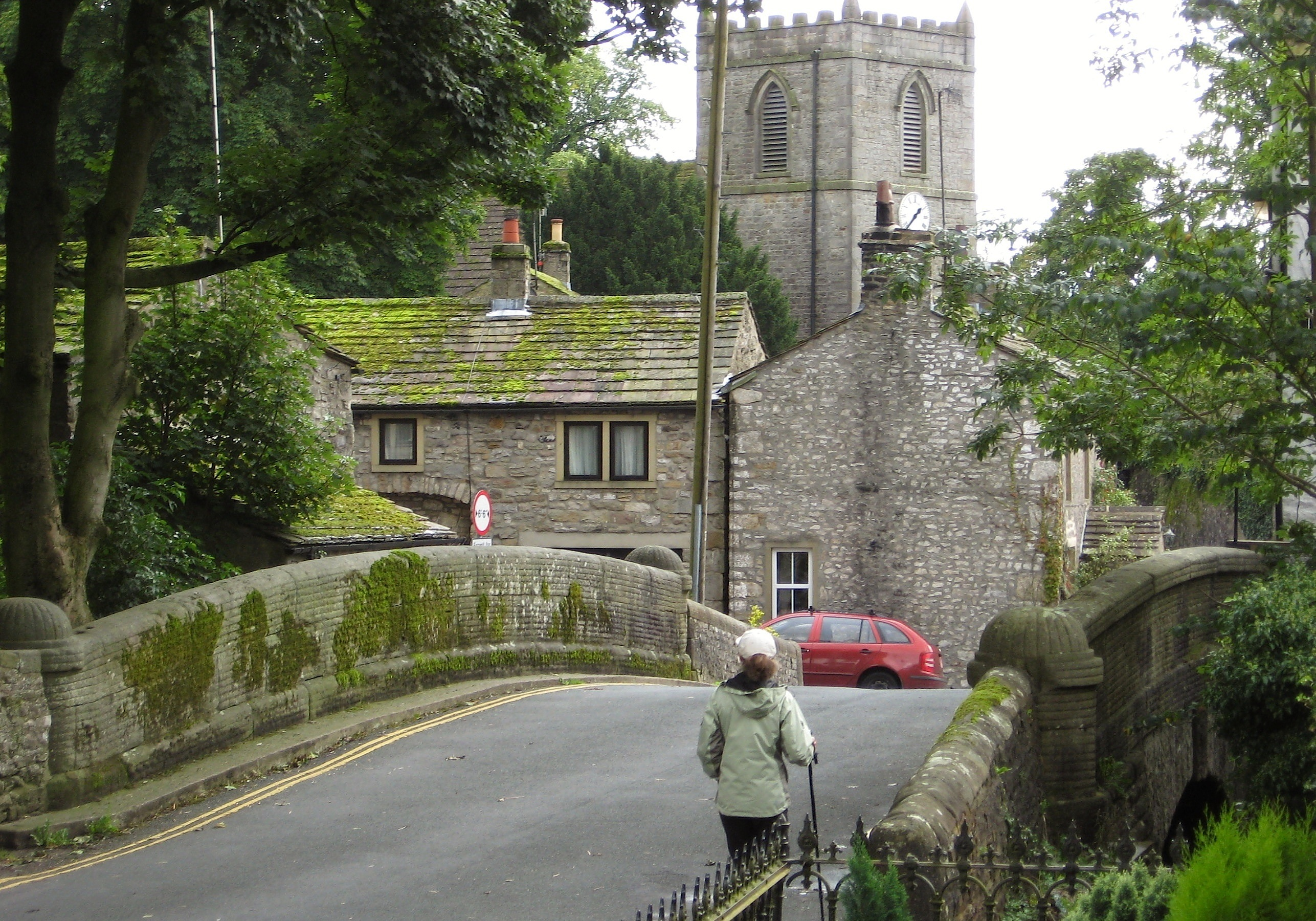
Kettlewell Beck Bridge to Kettlewell Church

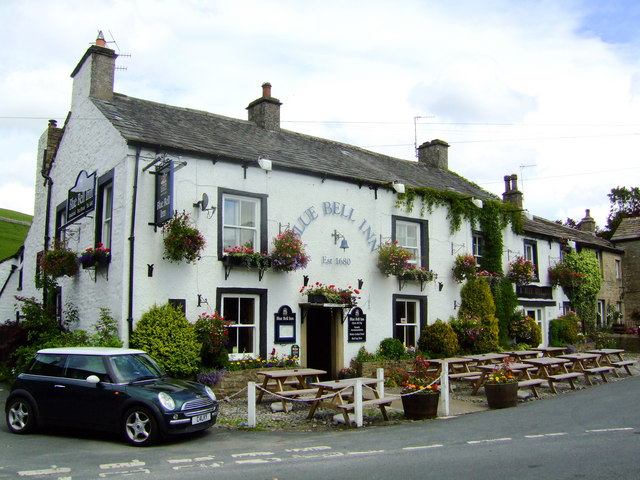
Blue Bell Inn (June 2007)

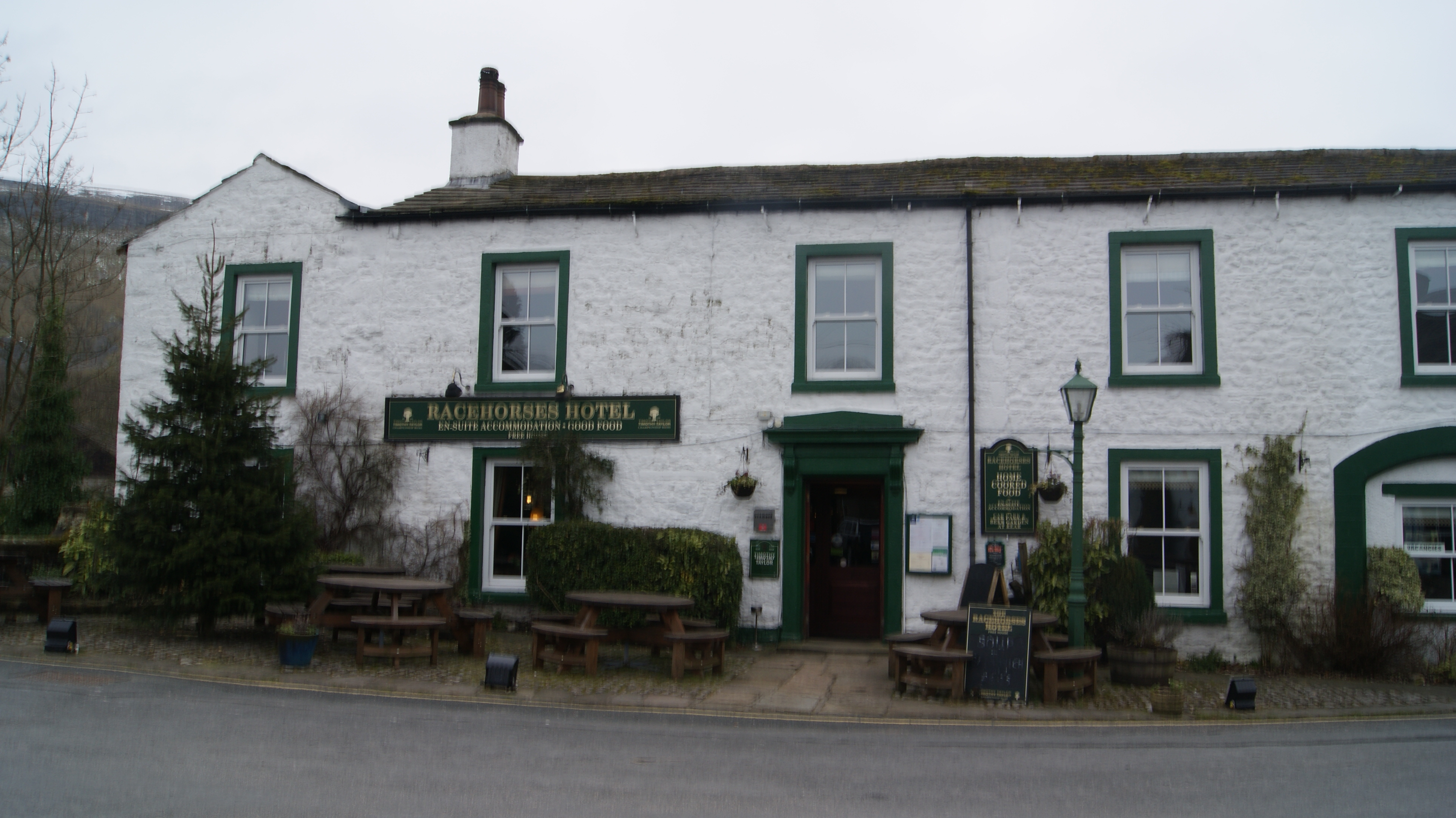
Racehorses Hotel (February 2013)

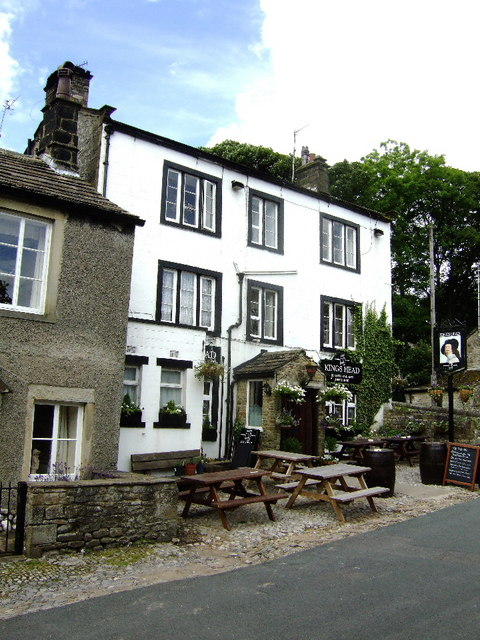
King's Head (June 2007)

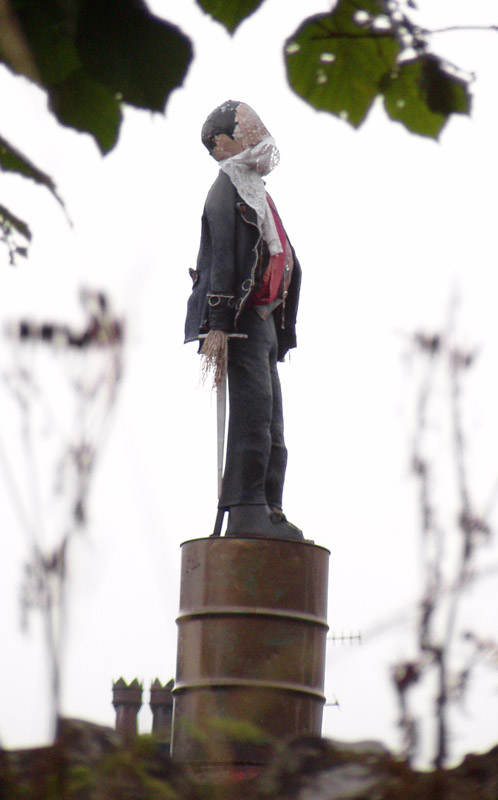
Scarecrow at the 2004 festival
