= Roche baronets =

Set index for Roche baronets

There have been two baronetcies created for persons with the surname Roche, once in the baronetage of Ireland and once in the baronetage of the United Kingdom. One creation is extant as of 2026.

- Roche baronets, of Fermoy (1782): see Sir Boyle Roche, 1st Baronet (1736–1807)
- Roche baronets of Carass (1838)
