= John Bayne =

John Bayne is the name of the following individuals:

- John Bayne of Pitcairlie (1620–1681), Scottish lawyer
- John Bayne (footballer) (1877–1915), Scottish footballer
- John Bayne (Presbyterian minister) (1806–1859), Scottish minister
- John H. Bayne (1804–1870), Maryland politician

== See also ==
- John Baine (disambiguation)
- John Baines (disambiguation)
- John Payne (disambiguation)
- John Wayne (disambiguation)
