= Glassford =

Coordinates: 55°42′01″N 4°01′44″W

Glassford: Scottish Gaelic: Fadhail Glainne; Scots: Glesart
- Glassford in 2025

- Location within South Lanarkshire
- Population: 690 (2020)
- OS grid reference: NS725470
- Council area: South Lanarkshire
- Lieutenancy area: Lanarkshire
- Country: Scotland
- Sovereign state: United Kingdom
- Post town: STRATHAVEN
- Postcode district: ML10
- Police: Scotland
- Fire: Scottish
- Ambulance: Scottish
- UK Parliament: East Kilbride and Strathaven
- Scottish Parliament: Clydesdale

Glassford (locally known as The Glesart) is a small village located 8 kilometres (5 mi) south of Hamilton, and 3 kilometres (2 mi) north-east of Strathaven, in South Lanarkshire, Scotland. It has a population of roughly 500–600 people. Features include the 19th-century Parish Church, and the remains of the 17th-century church, both of which are category B listed buildings. The Avon Water offers fishing and walks. The local No.13 or No 256 bus service comes through the village once every hour.

== People from Glassford ==
- Rev James Struthers
- Peter Wedderburn, Lord Chesterhall
