= James Struthers =

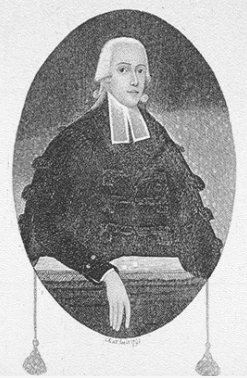
Rev James Struthers by John Kay

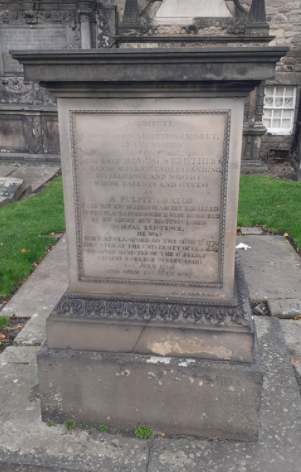
The grave of Rev James Struthers, Greyfriars Kirkyard

James Struthers (1770–1807) was a late 18th century Scottish minister renowned for his orations during the Scottish Enlightenment in Edinburgh.

== Life ==
He was born at Glassford in Lanarkshire on 31 October 1770. He studied at Glasgow University. He was licensed to preach around 1788.

In the summer of 1791, aged 20, he was ordained as minister of the Relief Church on College Street in Edinburgh (just south of Old College) in place of Rev James Baine.

In October 1793 he preached against the immorality of Rev David Gellatly of Haddington.

In 1805 he is listed as an Extraordinary Director of the Beneficent Society of Edinburgh alongside George Baird (Principal of Edinburgh University) and Adam Rolland.

He lived his final years in a flat at St Patrick Square in south Edinburgh.

He died on 13 July 1807 and in buried in Greyfriars Kirkyard. The grave lies midway along the main east path.

== Family ==
Struthers married a Miss Syme. They had six children but only two survived to adulthood:

- Rev James Syme Struthers minister of Georgetown in Demerara.
- Esther Crawford White Struthers (d. 1870) married Rev George Burns of Tweedsmuir
- John Pitcairn Struthers died 1814 in St Andrews

Struthers' widow married Robert Briggs MD (1768-1840) Professor of Medicine at St Andrews University.
