= John Baine =

John Baine may refer to:

- Attila the Stockbroker (John Baine, born 1957), English punk poet, musician and songwriter
- John Baine (politician), American politician in the Arkansas House of Representatives

== See also ==
- John Bayne (disambiguation)
- John Baines (disambiguation)
