= Franz Hedrich =

Franz Hedrich (30 July 1823 – 31 October 1895) was a German-Bohemian author and ghostwriter to Alfred Meissner.

== Life ==
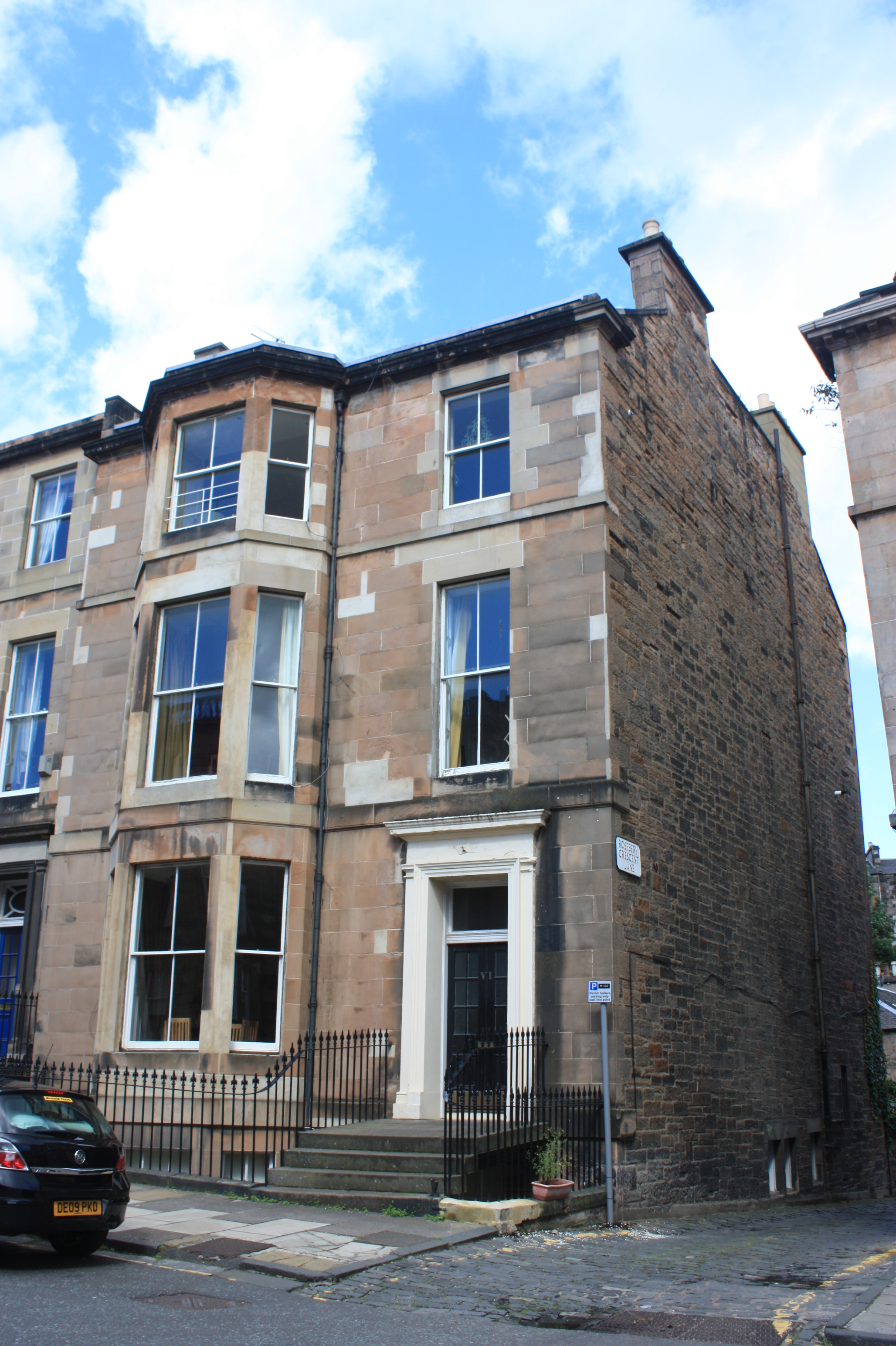
Hedrich's impressive house at 6 Rosebery Crescent, Edinburgh

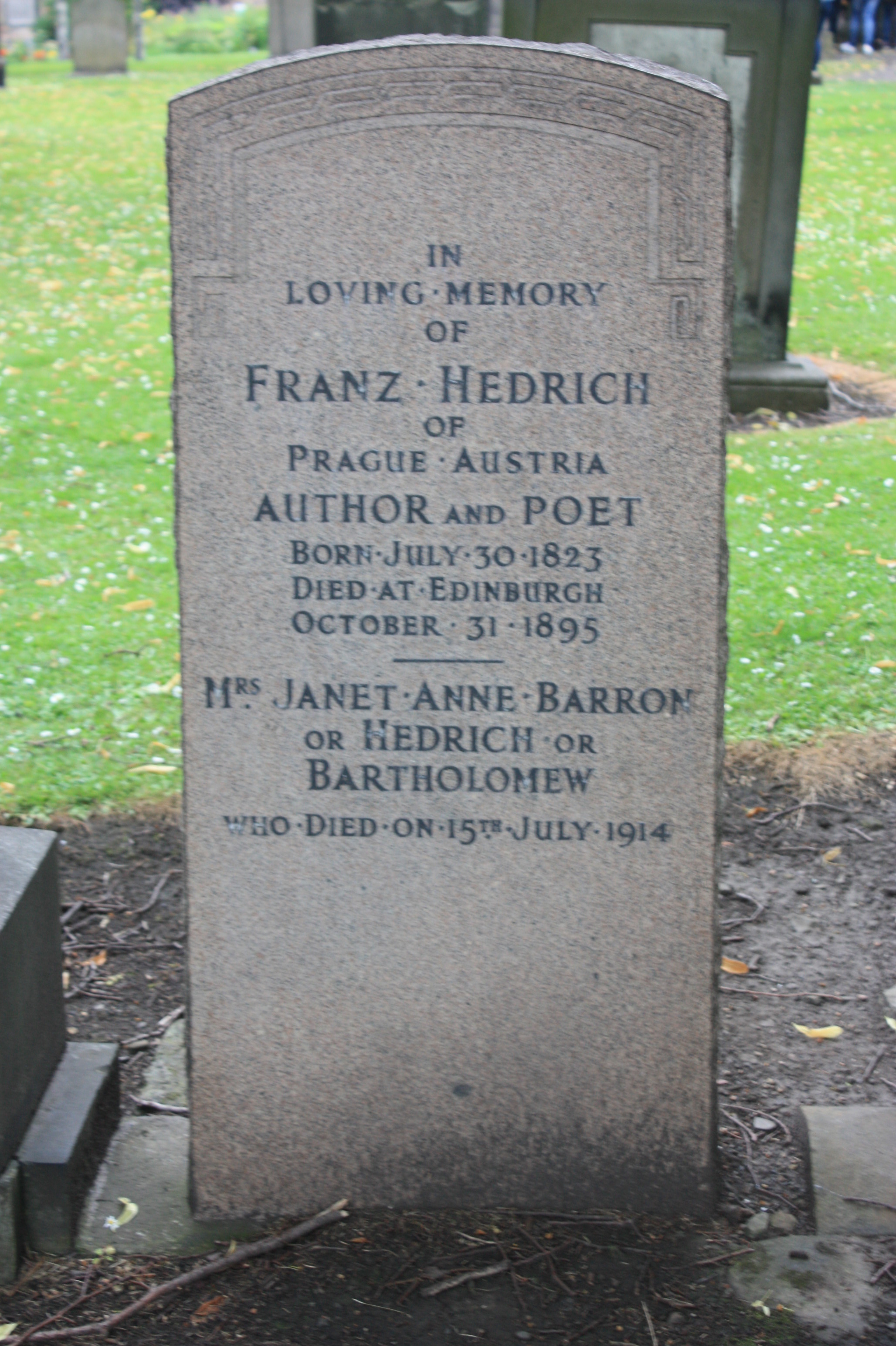
The grave of Franz Hedrich, Greyfriars Kirkyard, Edinburgh

He was born on 30 July 1823 in a small hamlet Podskalí near Písek in Bohemia (now part of the Czech Republic). His family moved Prague when his father went there as a bassoonist in the city theatres.

In the 1840s, he was introduced through Moritz Hartmann to the literary circle known as the Young Bohemians, where he befriended Alfred Meissner and began aiding in his literary work.

During the Revolutions of 1848, Hedrich was elected to the Frankfurt parliament representing the northern Bohemian district of Tannwald in the Jizera Mountains. He sat with the extreme left although, according to Meissner, he took little active part in the business of the parliament. In May 1849 he went with the so-called ‘Rump Parliament’ to Stuttgart.

After returning to Austria in 1851, Hedrich was interned in Traunkirchen, before being expelled in autumn 1852. He lived in Gotha and Coburg for several years, and from 1859 he settled in Munich, though he would often spend the summer with Meissner in the Bavarian Alps, or in Switzerland and Italy.

From 1855, Meissner produced a string of successful novels, including Sansara (1858), Schwarzgelb (1862–64) and Babel (1867), which Hedrich would later claim for himself. In 1871 Hedrich married Janet Anne Barron of Edinburgh. They lived mainly in Switzerland and France, also spending time in Scotland.

During this time Hedrich seems to have consumed his wife's inheritance, and a portion of Meissner's. He then blackmailed Meissner, who died following a suicide attempt in Bregenz in 1885.

After attempting, unsuccessfully, to extract funds from Robert Byr, Meissner's brother-in-law and literary executor, Hedrich published his version of events, causing a scandal throughout the German-speaking world. The story was covered in the British and US press. Literary opinion found that Hedrich had overstated his case, but that he had contributed to Meissner's works.

After Meissner's death, Hedrich lived mainly in Edinburgh, at 6 Rosebery Crescent in the city's West End. On 31 October 1895 Franz Hedrich died in Edinburgh in Scotland. He is buried in Greyfriars Kirkyard just south-west of the church.

== Publications ==
- Cain (dramatic poem in three acts) (1851)
- Lady Esther Stanhope, the Queen of Tadmor (tragedy in three acts) (1853)
- Moccagama (drama) (1853)
- Baron and Countess (drama), 1855
- In the High Mountains (1862)
