= Greyfriars Kirkyard =

Graveyard in Edinburgh, Scotland

Coordinates: 55°56′48″N 3°11′32″W

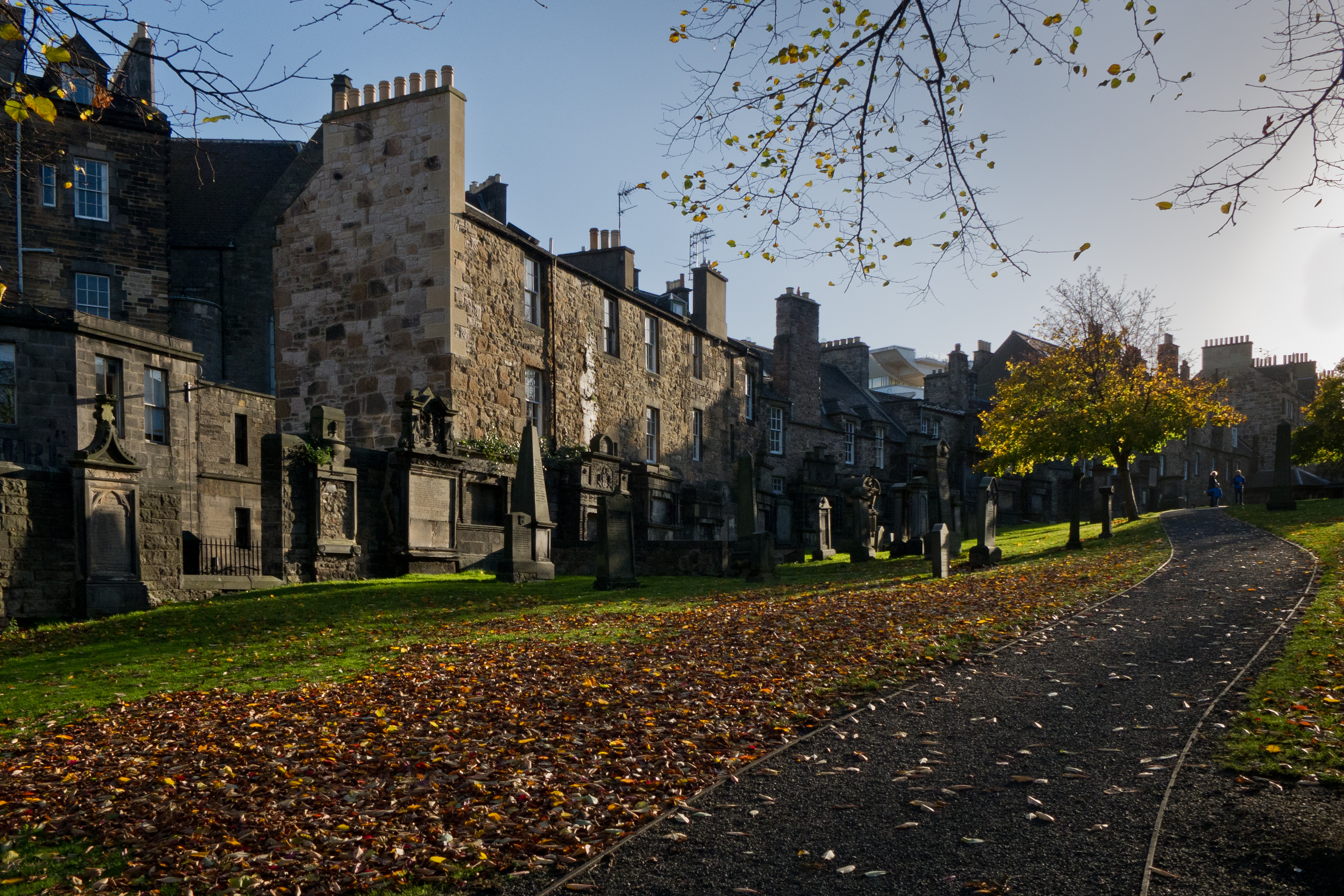
- Greyfriars Kirkyard
- Interactive map of Greyfriars Kirkyard

Details
- Established: 1561–1562
- Location: Old Town, Edinburgh
- Country: Scotland
- Type: Public
- Owned by: City of Edinburgh Council

Greyfriars Kirkyard is the graveyard surrounding Greyfriars Kirk in Edinburgh, Scotland. It is located at the southern edge of the Old Town, adjacent to George Heriot's School. Burials have been taking place since the late 16th century, and a number of notable Edinburgh residents are interred at Greyfriars. The Kirkyard is operated by the City of Edinburgh Council in liaison with a charitable trust, which is linked to but separate from the church. The Kirkyard and its monuments are protected as a category A listed building.

== History ==
Greyfriars takes its name from the Franciscan friary on the site (the friars of which wear grey habits), which was dissolved in 1560. The kirkyard was founded in August 1562 after royal sanctions were granted to replace the kirkyard at St Giles' Cathedral in Edinburgh. The latter burial ground was not used after around 1600.

The burgh council of Edinburgh resolved to make the changes on 23 April 1561:

Item, because it is thocht gude that thair be na buriell within the Kirk, and that the kirk yaird is nocht of sufficient rowme for bureing of the deid, and for eschewing of the savour and inconvenientis that may follow thairupoun in the heit of somer, it wald be providit that ane buriall place be maid farer from the myddis of the town, sic as in the Grey Freir yaird and the samyn biggit and maid close.

Because it is thought beneficial that there should be no more burials within the church (St Giles), and because that kirkyard is not thought to have sufficient room for burying the dead, and taking into consideration the smell and inconvenience in the heat of summer, it would be provided that a burial place be made further from the middle of town, such as in Greyfriars yard, and the same built and made secure.

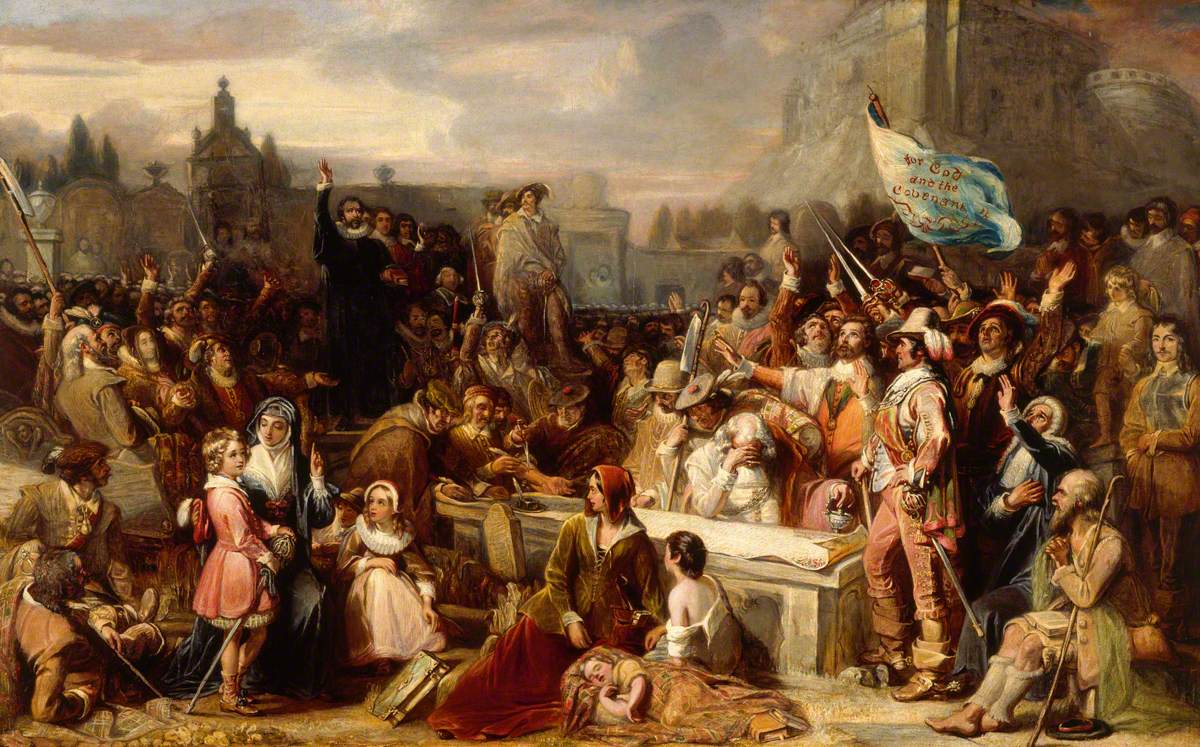
An oil painting of The Signing of the National Covenant in Greyfriars Kirkyard by William Allan (painter) in 1838

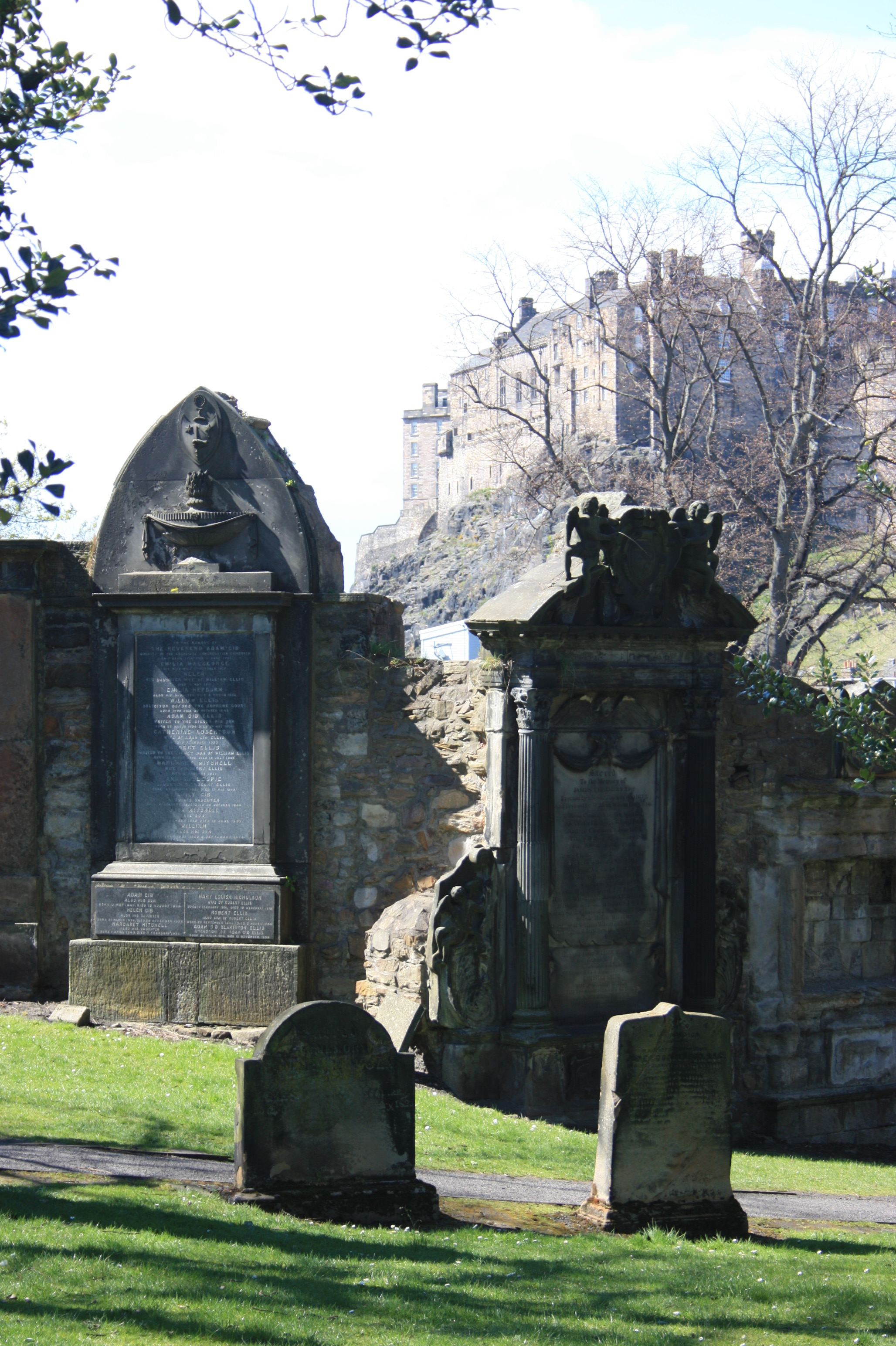
Greyfriars Kirkyard with Edinburgh Castle behind

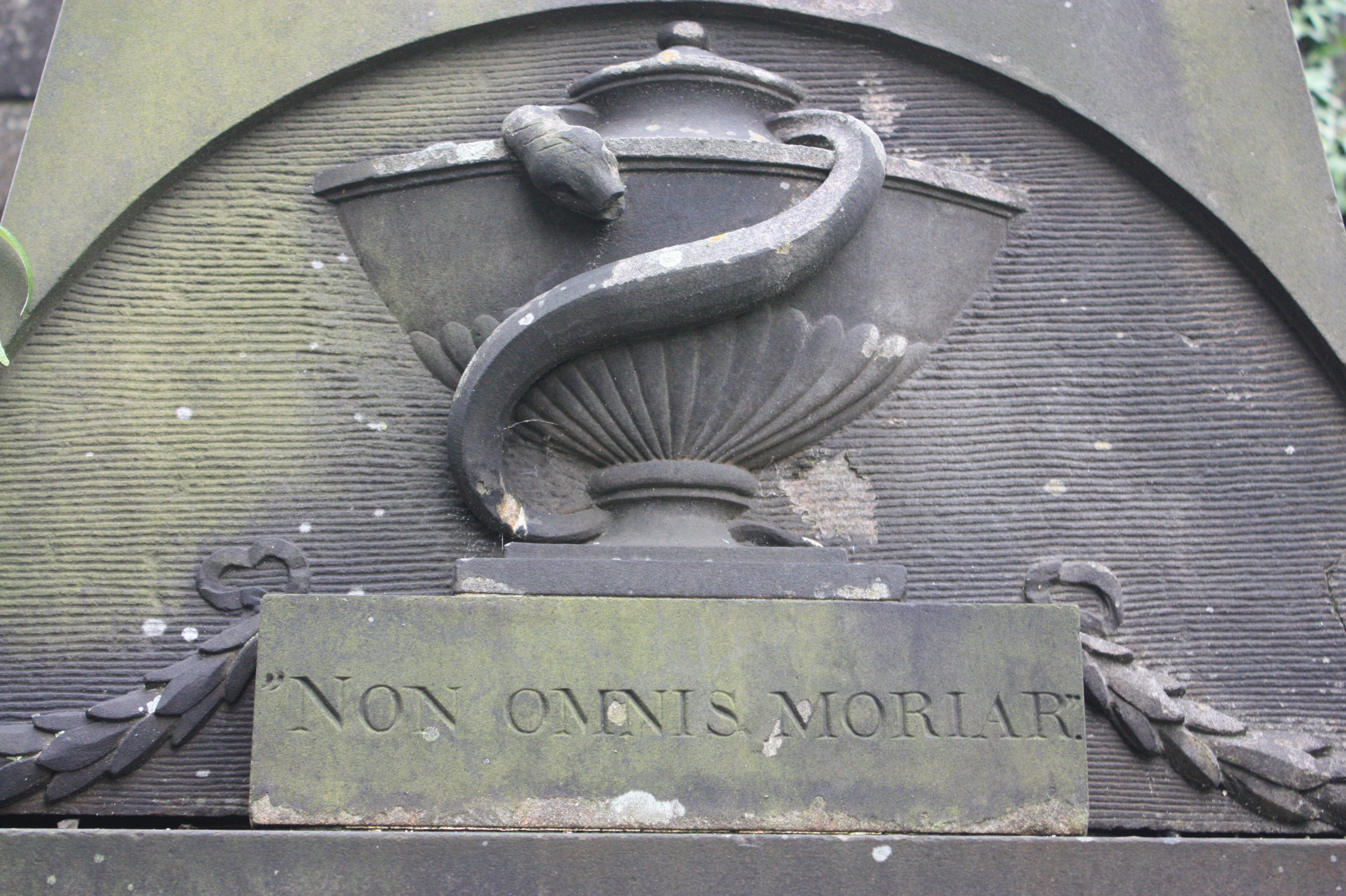
"Non Omnis Moriar" ("Not All of Me Will Die"), Greyfriars Kirkyard, Edinburgh

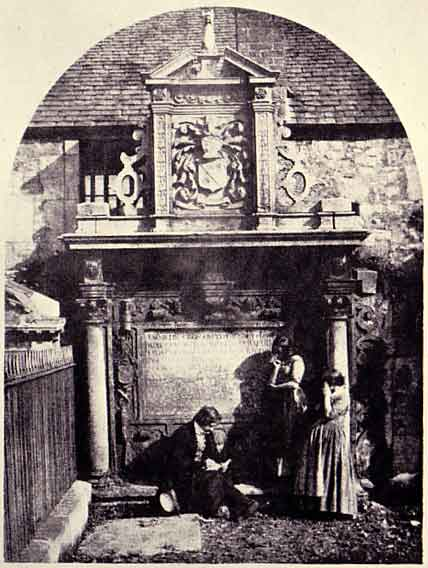
Hill & Adamson photograph dated 1848, showing D O Hill sketching at the Dennystoun Monument, watched by the Misses Morris

The Kirkyard was involved in the history of the Covenanters. The Covenanting movement began with the signing of the National Covenant in Greyfriars Kirk on 28 February 1638. Following the defeat of the militant Covenanters at Bothwell Brig in 1679, some 1200 Covenanters were imprisoned in a field to the south of the churchyard. When, in the 18th century, part of this field was amalgamated into the churchyard as vaulted tombs, the area became known as the "Covenanters' Prison".

During the early days of photography in the 1840s the kirkyard was used by David Octavius Hill and Robert Adamson as a setting for several portraits and tableaux such as The Artist and The Gravedigger.

=== Covenanters ===
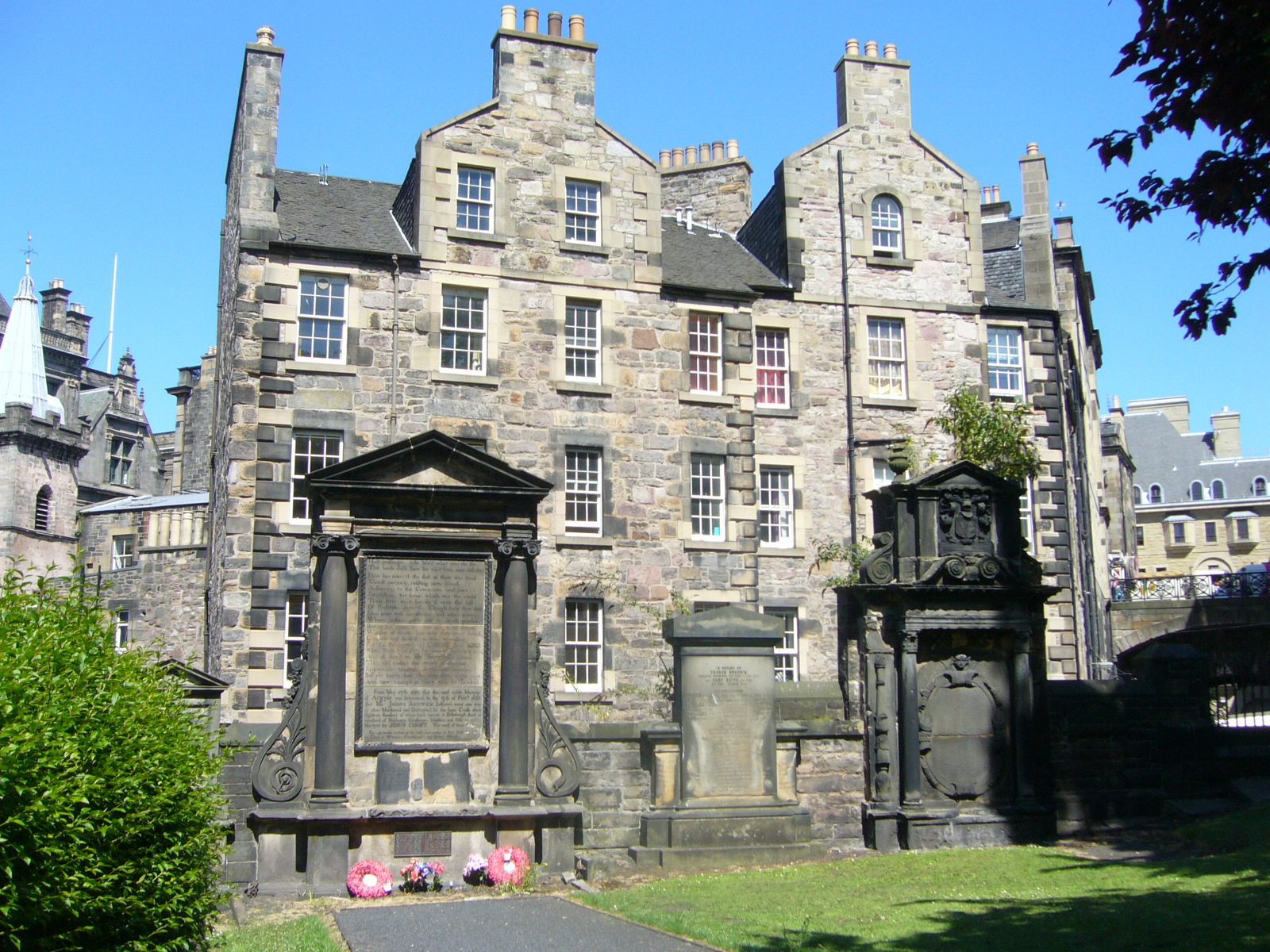
Martyrs' Monument (left), commemorating James Guthrie, James Renwick, the Marquis of Argyll, and the other Covenanters who died during 'The Killing Time' (1661–88)

The National Covenant was signed in the graveyard (as it was a place of free legal public assembly) in 1638. Whilst some depictions of the event show them leaning on table stones, these stones did not exist at that time and the signing was done during the period of the ban on central gravestones.

Following the Battle of Bothwell Bridge (22 June 1679), some 1200 prisoners were brought to Edinburgh. There being too numerous for containment in the prison or castle, a makeshift "prison" was formed in a field south of Greyfriars Kirkyard, to hold around 400 not containable elsewhere. This area was conveniently enclosed on two sides by the Flodden Wall and on a third side (the west) by the high enclosing wall of George Heriot's School. The fourth side faced the churchyard and was separated by an easily patrolled and guarded picket fence.

The name Covenanters Prison stuck. The bulk of the area was built on by the city Bedlam (around 1690). A remaining strip of land, sandwiched between the Bedlam and George Heriot's School, was used for additional burial ground from around 1700. The style at the time was to build in enclosed vaults, and this is the dominant form in this section. As the vaults did not exist at the time of the area's prison use, despite their potential to be used as prison cells, this was never the case.

The area was open to public view until around 1990, but was thereafter locked by the City of Edinburgh Council to stem persistent vandalism and use by drug users. The area is accessible during the day by special arrangement with the guides at Greyfriard Kirk during their opening hours and at night by going on a City of the Dead Tour where the Black Mausoleum can be visited.

=== Greyfriars Bobby ===
The graveyard is associated with Greyfriars Bobby, the loyal dog who guarded his master's grave. Bobby's headstone at the entrance to the Kirkyard, erected by the Dog Aid Society in 1981, marks his reputed burial place, however, as there are no parts of the kirkyard that is not consecrated it is also believed he was buried under a tree outside the gates to the right of the current main entrance. The dog's statue is opposite the graveyard's gate, at the junction of George IV Bridge and Candlemaker Row. The grave of a Pentland Hills Shepherd, "Auld Jock" (John Gray), where the dog famously slept for 14 years, lies on the eastern path, some 30m north of the entrance. The stone is modern, the grave originally being unmarked.

== Monuments ==
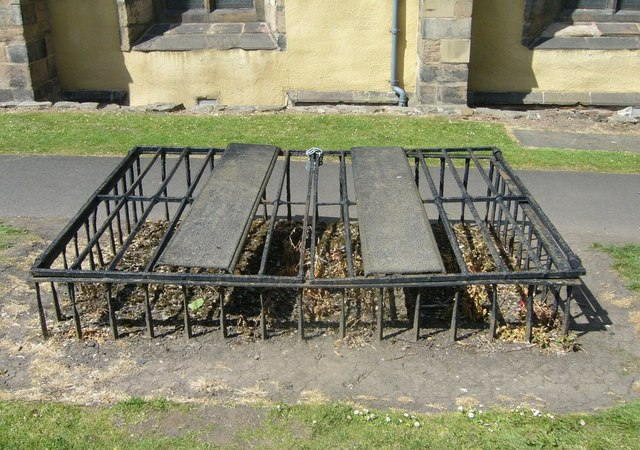
Mortsafes to deter 'resurrectionists' from exhuming the dead, before the 1832 Anatomy Act regulated the legal supply of corpses for medical purposes

Enclosed burial lairs are found mainly on the south edge of the graveyard and in the "Covenanters' Prison". These either have solid stone walls or iron railings and were created as a deterrent to grave robbing, which had become a problem in the eighteenth century. Greyfriars also has two low ironwork cages called mortsafes. These were leased and protected bodies for long enough to deter the attention of the early nineteenth-century resurrection men who supplied Edinburgh Medical College with corpses for dissection.

The kirkyard displays some of Scotland's finest mural monuments from the early 17th century, rich in symbolism of both mortality and immortality, such as the Death Head, Angel of the Resurrection, and the King of Terrors. These are mostly found along the east and west walls of the old burial yard to the north of the kirkyard.

Notable monuments include the Martyr's Monument, which commemorates executed Covenanters. The Italianate monument to Sir George Mackenzie was designed by the architect James Smith, and modelled on the Tempietto di San Pietro, designed by Donato Bramante. Duncan Ban MacIntyre's memorial was renovated in 2005, at a cost of about £3,000, raised by a fundraising campaign for over a year. The monument of John Byres of Coates, 1629, was one of the last works of the royal master mason William Wallace.

=== Bloody MacKenzie's Tomb ===
In 2003, the distinctive domed tomb of Sir George MacKenzie was entered by two teenage boys, aged 17 and 15, via a ventilation slot in the rear (now sealed). They reached the lower vault (containing the coffins), broke the coffins open and stole a skull. The pair narrowly escaped imprisonment on the little-used but still extant charge of violating sepulchres.

== Notable burials ==
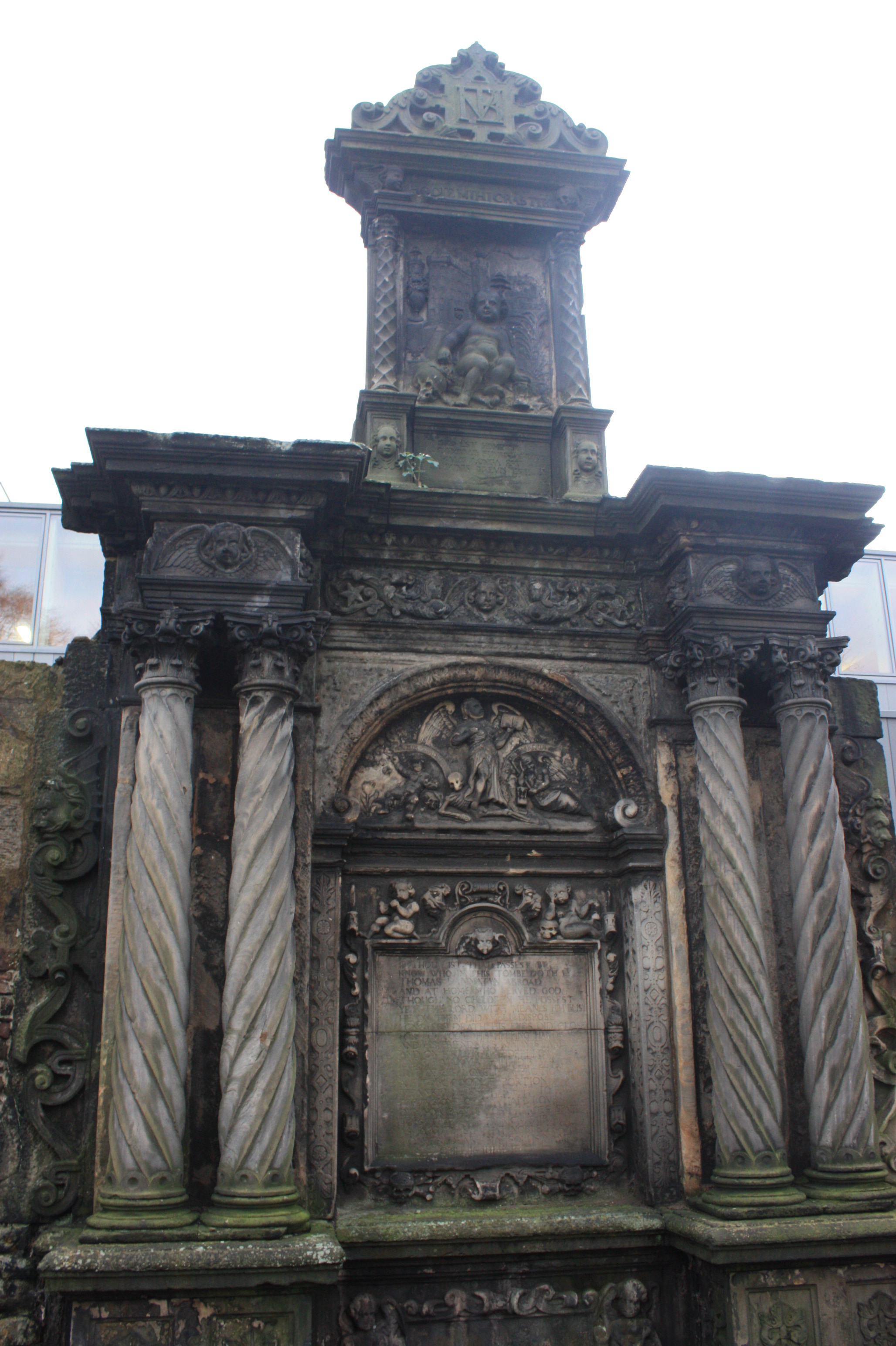
The huge monument to Thomas Bannatyn, Greyfriars Kirkyard

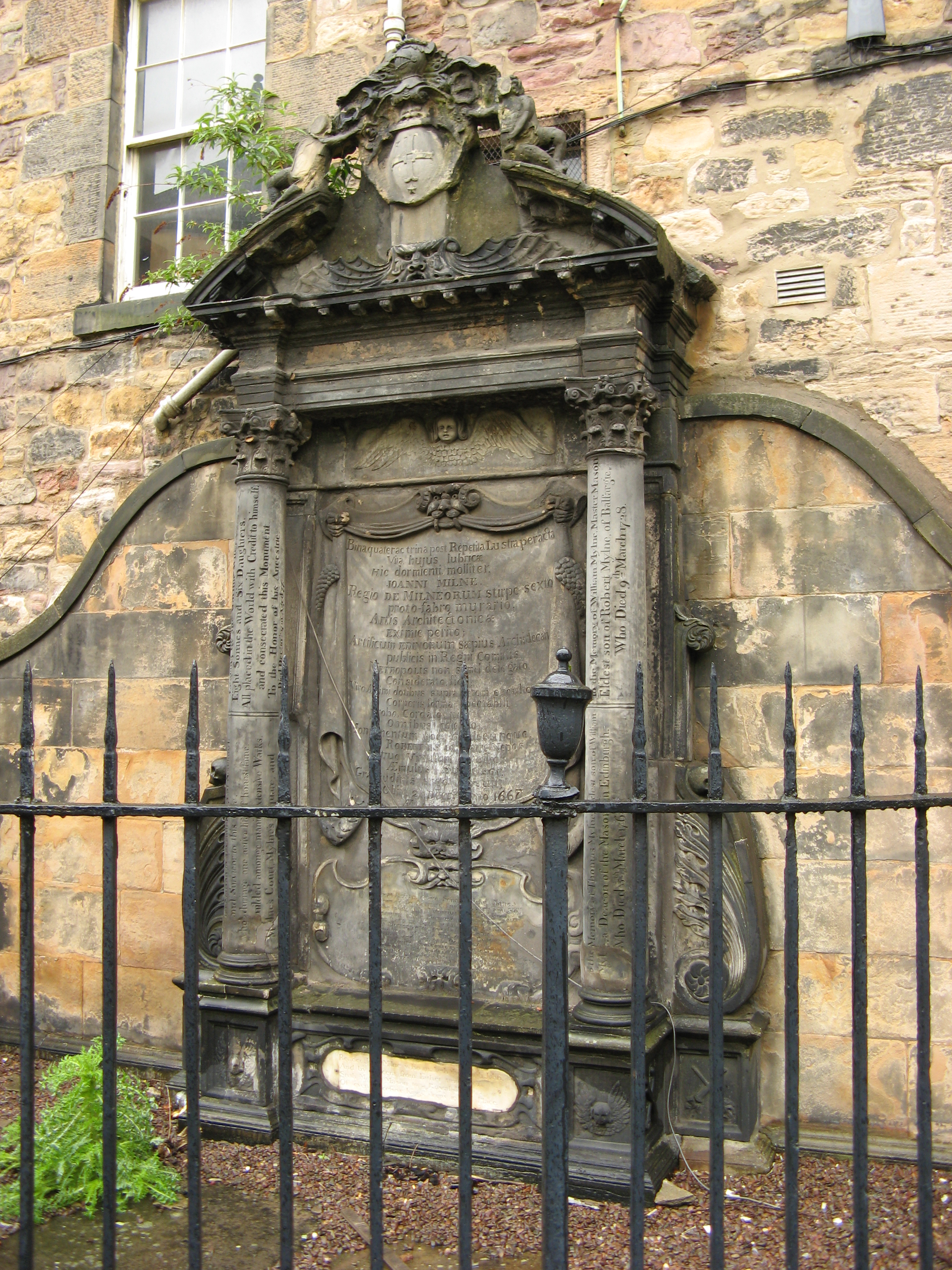
Monument to John Mylne, erected by his nephew Robert

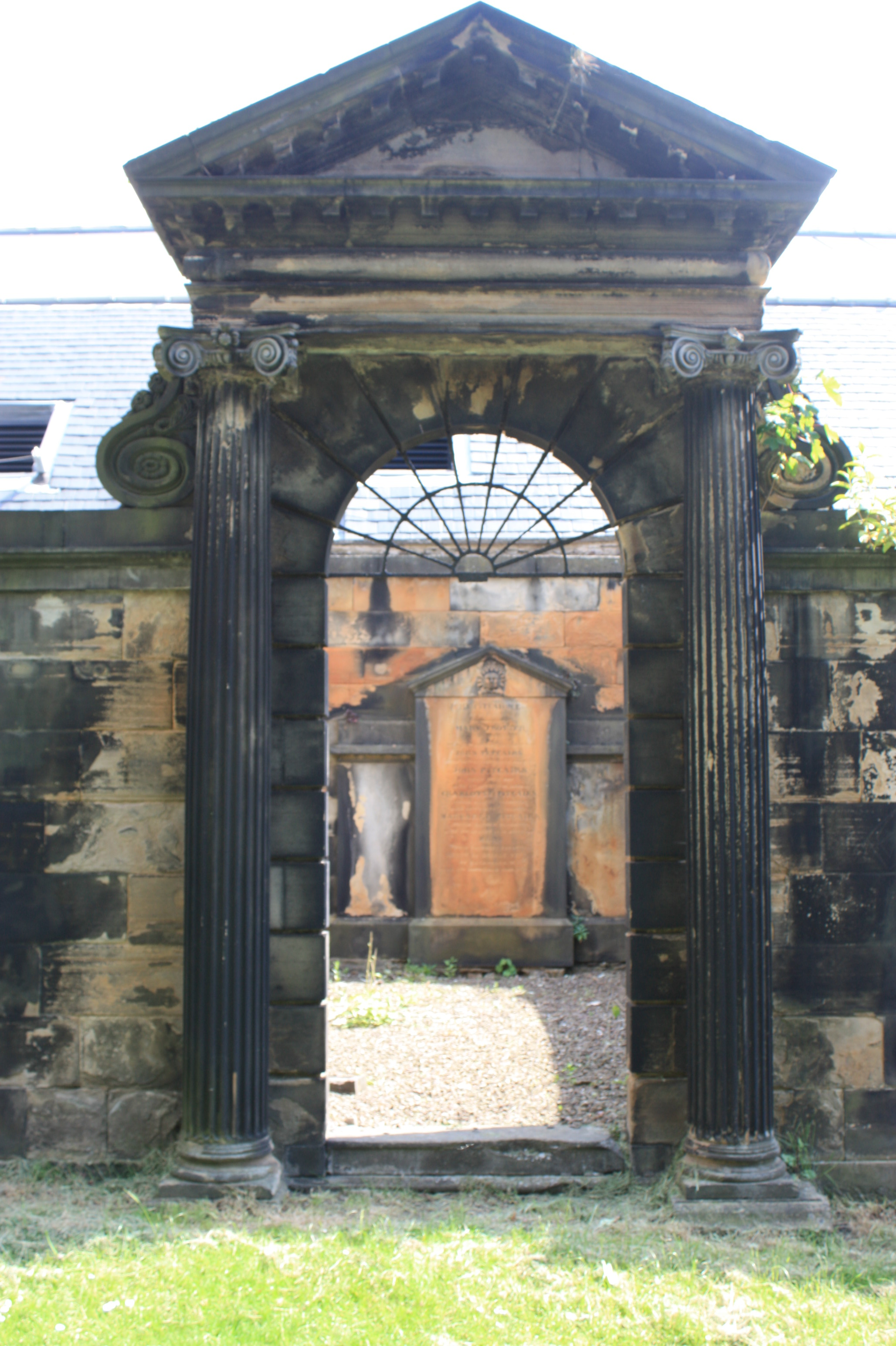
The Pitcairne vault within the Covenanter's Prison, Greyfriars Kirkyard

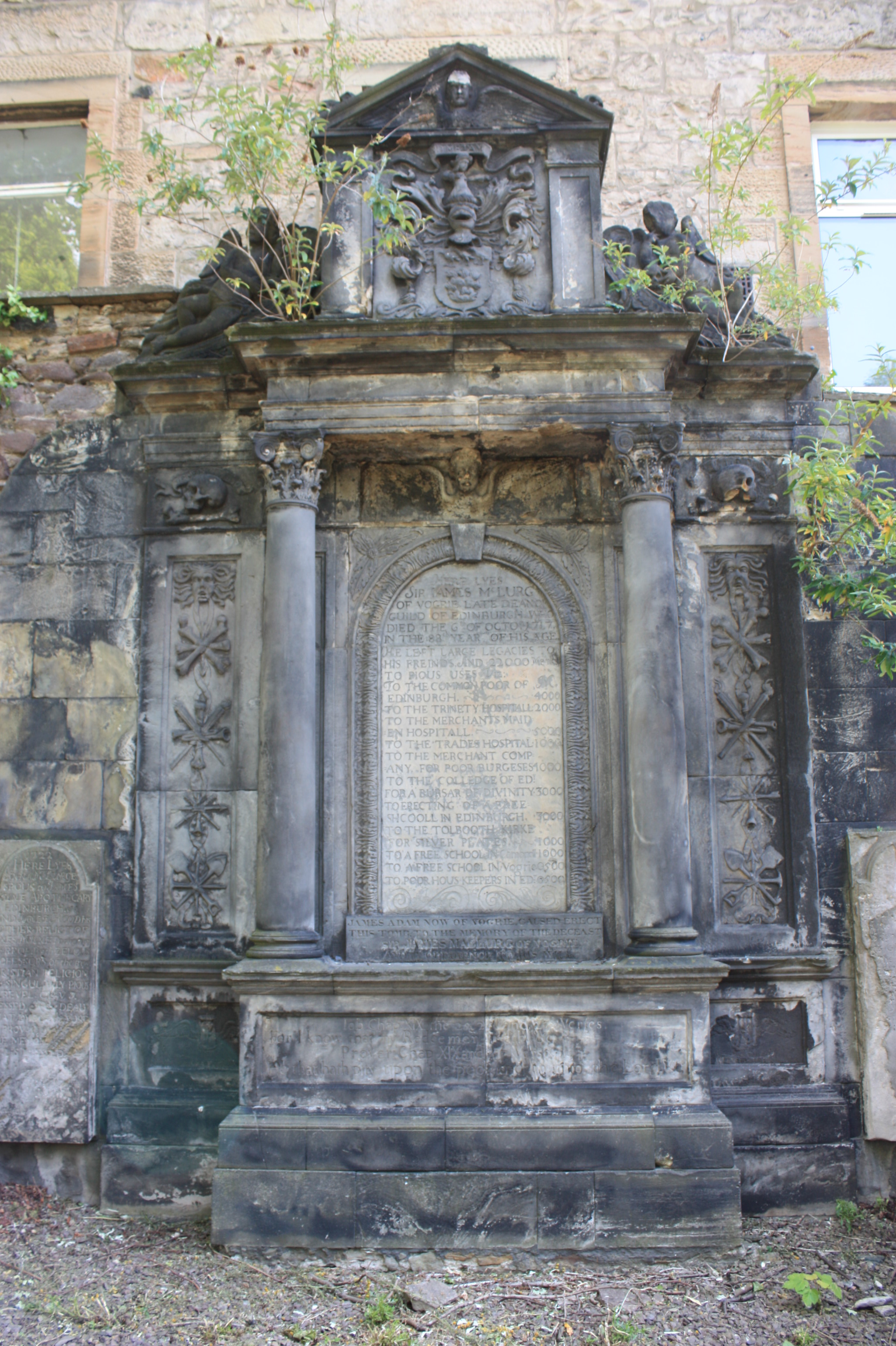
Sir James McLurg's tomb in the Covenanter's Prison

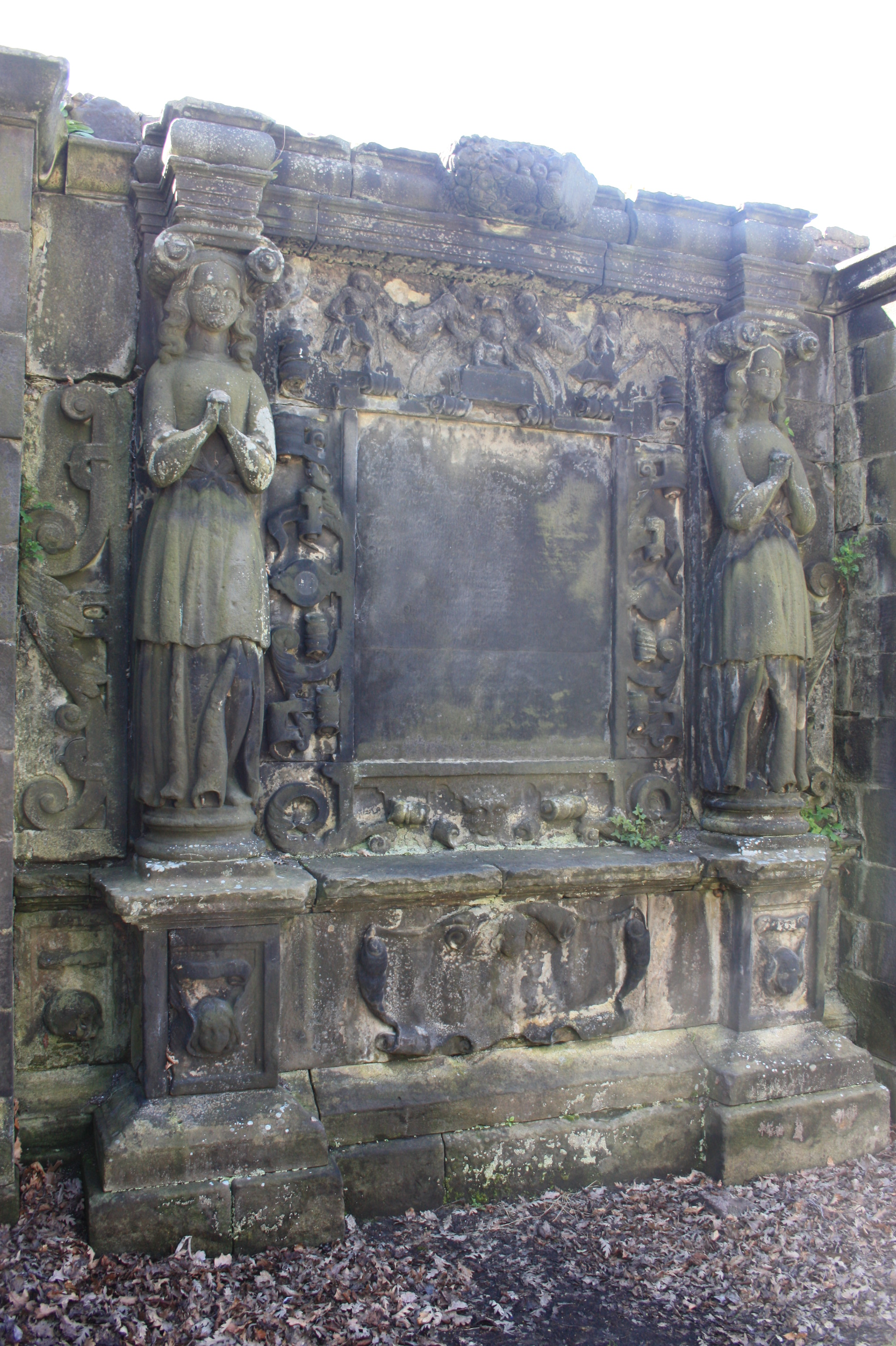
The Kincaid monument, Greyfriars Kirkyard

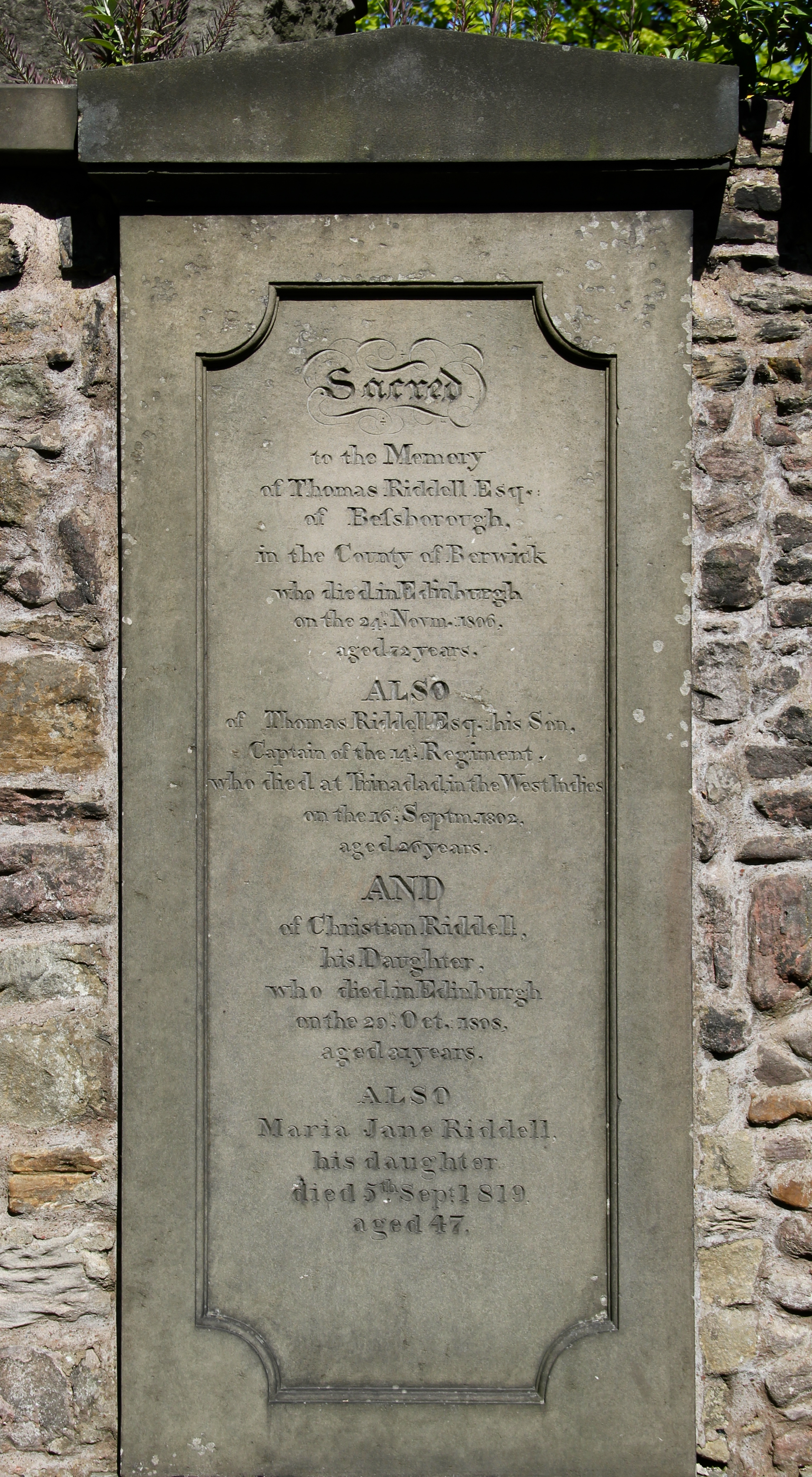
Thomas Riddell's Grave, Greyfriars Kirkyard

(note-CP denotes graves within the sealed south-west section known as the Covenanters Prison)

=== A ===
- William Adam (architect) (1689–1748), with his son John Adam (architect) (1721–1792)
- William Adam of Blair Adam (1751–1839), judge
- Alexander Adie FRSE (1775–1859), optical instrument maker
- David Aikinhead (1566–1637), twice Lord Provost of Edinburgh, 1620–22 and 1625–30
- William Annand (1633–1681), minister and Dean of St Giles Cathedral

=== B ===
- Sir Robert Baird of Saughtonhall (1630–1697), Cashier of the Scottish Carolina Company
- Leslie Balfour-Melville (1854–1937), golfer
- John Bayne of Pitcairlie (1620–1681), Writer to the Signet
- John Beugo (1759–1841), engraver
- Joseph Black (1728–1799), physician (CP)
- Rev Hugh Blair (1718–1800)
- Sir James Hunter Blair, 1st Baronet (1741–1787)
- Robert Blair, Lord Avontoun (1741–1811), judge (CP)
- Very Rev Andrew Brown (1763–1834), minister and historian of Nova Scotia
- George Buchanan (died 1582), historian and reformer
- James Buchanan of Drumpellier (1726–1786), twice Lord Provost of Glasgow after whom Buchanan Street is named
- James Burnett, Lord Monboddo (1714–1799), judge (CP – unmarked)
- Sir John Byres of Coates (Coittes) (1569–1629)

=== C ===
- Robert Cadell (1788–1849), publisher
- Archibald Campbell, 9th Earl of Argyll (1629–1685), nobleman
- General Duncan Campbell of Lochnell (1763–1837)
- Very Rev Dr John Campbell (1758–1828), Moderator of the Church of Scotland in 1818
- Sir Hugh Campbell of Cesnock, covenanter and MP for Ayrshire (1615–1688)
- Aglionby Ross Carson FRSE (1780–1850), rector of the High School 1820–1845, author
- William Carstares (1649–1715), churchman and statesman
- Colonel Francis Charteris (1675–1732), notorious rake and member of the Hellfire club
- Robert Chieslie (c. 1650 – c. 1705), Lord Provost who lost a fortune in the Darien scheme and died in Darien House (the asylum).
- Prof Alexander Christison FRSE (1753–1820)
- William Colvill (d. 1675), principal of University of Edinburgh, location unknown
- William Coulter, Lord Provost of Edinburgh (1808–1810)
- Bishop William Cowper (1568–1619)
- James Craig (1739–1795), architect and designer of Edinburgh's New Town
- William Creech (1745–1815), bookseller and Lord Provost of Edinburgh
- Andrew Crosbie (1736–1785), lawyer and founding Fellow of the Royal Society of Edinburgh (unmarked)
- Sir Hugh Cunningham of Bonnington (1643–1710), Lord Provost of Edinburgh 1702–04 (CP)

=== D ===
- John Dalrymple (1734–1779), Lord Provost 1770 and 1777 (CP)
- Prof Andrew Dalzell, FRSE Professor of Greek at the University of Edinburgh (1742–1806)
- Charles Kemp Davidson, Lord Davidson (1929–2009), Senator of the College of Justice
- Robert Denniston, Conservator of the Staple (died 1625).
- Forrest Dewar (1748–1817), surgeon, President of the Royal College of Surgeons of Edinburgh 1786/88
- Alexander Donaldson (1727–1794), bookseller and publisher
- Admiral Sir Charles Douglas, 1st Baronet (1727–1789)
- James Douglas, 4th Earl of Morton (c. 1516–1581), Regent of Scotland
- Adam Drummond of Binend (1679–1758), Professor of Anatomy at the University of Edinburgh
- Adam Drummond (1713–1786)
- Very Rev John Drysdale FRSE DD (1718–1788), twice Moderator of the Church of Scotland in both 1773 and 1784, son-in-law to William Adam and buried in the Adam mausoleum
- Prof George Dunbar (classical scholar) (1777–1851)
- William Dunlop (ecclesiastical historian) (1692–1720)

=== E ===
- John Erskine (theologian) (1721–1803)
- Mary Erskine (1629–1708), founder of The Mary Erskine School (CP)

=== F ===
- Sir David Falconer (1640–1685), judge
- Sir James Falconer of Phesdo (1648–1706), judge and Senator of the College of Justice
- Sir Adam Ferguson (1770–1854), soldier son of Adam Ferguson (CP)
- James Ferguson, Lord Pitfour (1700–1777)
- Admiral John Macpherson Ferguson (1784–1855), younger son of Adam Ferguson (CP)
- Duncan Forbes, Lord Culloden (1685–1747), politician and judge
- Sir William Forbes, 6th Baronet of Monymusk and Pitsligo FRSE (1739–1806) and his son Sir William Forbes, 7th Baronet (1773–1828), banker
- Sir James Forrest, 1st Baronet (1780–1860), Lord Provost of Edinburgh 1837–43
- Alexander Forrester (1611–1686)

=== G ===
- Francis Garden, Lord Gardenstone (1721–1793), judge (unmarked grave)
- William Ged (1699–1749), inventor of stereotyping (unmarked grave)
- Walter Geikie (1795–1837), artist
- Arthur Giles (1834–1921), Princes Street bookseller and printer
- Adam Gillies, Lord Gillies (1760–1842), judge (CP)
- Dr John Gordon (1786–1818), anatomist and anti-phrenologist
- Lewis Duncan Brodie Gordon (1815–1876), civil engineer
- Very Rev Prof John Gowdie (1682–1762), Moderator in 1733, Principal of University of Edinburgh
- Admiral Alexander Graeme (1741–1818), naval officer
- James Graham (1745–1794), quack doctor who pioneered sex therapy and invented earth-bathing
- James Gillespie Graham (1777–1855), architect (CP)
- Lord Patrick Grant (1691–1754), judge (CP)
- John Gray (died 1858), owner of Greyfriars Bobby

=== H ===
- John Hall of Dunglass (1650–1695), Lord Provost and his great grandson Sir James Hall (1761–1832) geologist
- Robert Hamilton (advocate) FRSE (1763–1831), friend of Sir Walter Scott
- Matthew Hardie (1755–1826), violin maker nicknamed the 'Scottish Stradivari'
- Franz Hedrich (1823–1895), German poet
- Alexander Henderson (died 1646), churchman and statesman
- Thomas Henderson FRSE (1798–1844), unmarked within the grave of his father-in-law Alexander Adie
- George Heriot (1540–1610), goldsmith, father to George Heriot
- Rev Prof John Hill FRSE (1747–1805), classicist
- Vice Admiral Sir George Home (1740–1803)
- Sir James Home (1790–1836)
- Vice Admiral Sir John Home of Blackadder (died 1803)
- John Hope (botanist) (1725–1786), his physician son, Thomas Charles Hope (1766–1844), his grandson, John Hope (lawyer) (1807–1893), and five other members of his family
- Sir Thomas Hope, 1st Baronet (1573–1646)
- William Howison (1798–1850), engraver
- Alexander Gibson Hunter of Blackness (1771–1812), book collector and publisher in partnership with Archibald Constable
- James Hutton (1726–1797), geologist (CP)

=== I ===
- Sir David Innes (died 1866)
- Gilbert Innes of Stow (died 1832)

=== J ===
- George Jamesone (1587–1644), Scotland's foremost 17th century portrait artist

=== K ===
- John Kay (caricaturist) (1742–1826)
- Alexander Kemp FRSE (1822–1854), chemist
- Robert Kerr (1759–1813), scientific author
- Rev James Kirkton (1628–1699) in the Trotter vault

=== L ===
- James L'Amy of Dunkenny FRSE (1772–1854), advocate and phrenologist
- John Law (c. 1632–1712), minister and prisoner on the Bass Rock
- Sir John Leach (1760–1834), judge, buried in the Adam mausoleum
- John Learmonth of Dean (1789–1858), Lord Provost of Edinburgh 1831–33 (CP) and his ancestor James Learmonth, Lord Balcomie
- William Little (1525–1601), twice Lord Provost of Edinburgh 1586 and 1591
- Sir George Lockhart (1630–1689), murder victim buried in Mackenzie's tomb

=== M ===
- Thomas McCrie (1772–1835), historian, and his son Thomas M'Crie the Younger (1797–1875)
- Alexander MacDuff of Bonhard FRSE (1816–1866)
- William McGonagall (1825–1902), poet
- Duncan Ban MacIntyre (1724–1812), Gaelic poet
- Colin MacLaurin (1698–1746), mathematician, and his son John Maclaurin, Lord Dreghorn (1734–1796)
- Hugh Mackail, martyr (1640?–1666), minister hanged at the market-cross after being tortured with the boot
- Sir George Mackenzie (1636–1691), Lord Advocate
- Henry Mackenzie (1745–1831), writer and author of The Man of Feeling, father of Joshua Henry Mackenzie, Lord Mackenzie (1774–1851)
- John MacMorran (1553–1595), Burgh official shot by schoolchildren.
- Sir James McLurg of Vogrie (1629–1717), Dean of Guild, philanthropist, major investor in the Darien scheme (CP)
- John Manderston, Lord Provost of Edinburgh (1819–21)
- Lachlan MacTavish of Dunardry (1740–1796), 19th Hereditary Chief of Clan MacTavish
- Sir John Medina (1659–1710), prominent artist (the "sunken" vault on the east side)
- Alexander Miller (died 1616), tailor to James VI
- Patrick Miller of Dalswinton (1731–1815), steamship inventor
- Mary Arbuthnot Moir (1804–1900), friend of Walter Scott
- Alexander Moncrieff (1613–1688), prominent 17C minister, grandfather of Alexander Moncrieff
- Robert Scott Moncrieff (1793–1869), advocate and amateur artist, father of Colin Scott-Moncrieff (CP)
- Dr. Alexander Monro (1697–1767), father of Alexander (1733–1817), famed anatomists
- Alexander Monteith (surgeon) (1660–1713), surgeon and apothecary
- Sir Archibald Muir, twice Lord Provost of Edinburgh 1691–92 and 1696–98
- Sir Harry Munro, 7th Baronet (1720–1781), military leader during the Rebellion of 1745
- Prof Alexander Murray (1775–1813)
- James Murray of Deuchar (1571–1649), wealthy merchant
- John Mylne (1611–1667), mason and architect

=== N ===
- Sir William Newbigging FRSE (1772–1852), physician
- Alexander Nisbet (1657–1725), antiquarian and author of A System of Heraldry (grave location unclear)
- John Nisbet (1627–1685), Covenanter, hanged at the Grassmarket

=== O ===
- William Oliphant, Lord Newton (1561–1628), judge

=== P ===
- John Paton, Covenanter and army captain, executed in 1684
- Archibald Pitcairne (1652–1713), physician
- Captain John Porteous (c. 1695–1736), soldier and lynching victim, after whom the Porteous Riots are named
- Gilbert Primrose (1535–1616), surgeon

=== R ===
- James Rae (surgeon) (1716–1791)
- Allan Ramsay (1686–1758), poet
- Archibald Riddell (minister), prisoner on the Bass Rock and covenanting minister at New Jersey and Edinburgh
- General Henry James Riddell (died 1861), commander in chief of the Scottish army
- Thomas Riddell, possible inspiration for J. K. Rowling's fictional character who cannot be named
- William Ritchie (1781–1832), founder and editor of The Scotsman
- William Robertson D.D. (1721–1793), historian and his son Lt Col David Robertson MacDonald
- William Robertson (antiquary) FRSE (1740–1803)
- George Romanes FRS (1848–1894) (memorial only)
- William Roxburgh (1751–1815), botanist
- Thomas Ruddiman (1674–1757), classical scholar and grammarian
- Gilbert Rule (1629 (approx) – 1701), minister and the Principal of Edinburgh University from 1690 to 1701

=== S ===
- Sir William Scott of Thirlestane (1670–1725), landowner and poet (CP)
- Sir Robert Sibbald (1641–1722), physician and botanist
- Henry Siddons (1774–1815), failed actor, son of Sarah Siddons, husband of Harriet Siddons
- Sir James Skene (died 1633), President of the College of Justice
- John Skene, Lord Curriehill (died 1617)
- William Smellie (encyclopedist) (1740–1795) creator of the Encyclopædia Britannica
- Sir James Spittal (1769–1842), Lord Provost of Edinburgh 1833 until 1837 and his son Dr Robert Spittal
- Sir James Stewart (Lord Advocate) (1635–1713), location of grave unknown
- Rev Dr. Matthew Stewart (mathematician) (1717–1785), father of Dugald Stewart (unmarked grave)
- James Stirling (1692–1770), mathematician
- Sir James Stirling, 1st Baronet (1739–1805), three times Lord Provost of Edinburgh and Sir Gilbert Stirling, baronet
- Rev James Struthers (1770–1807), famous orator
- James Stuart of Binend (1716–1777), twice Lord Provost of Edinburgh, father of Charles Stuart of Dunearn (1745–1826)

=== T ===
- Prof John Thomson FRS FRSE (1765–1846), President of the Royal College of Surgeons of Edinburgh
- Archibald Tod (d. 1656), twice Lord Provost of Edinburgh 1646–48 and 1651–54
- Robert Traill (1603–1678), minister of the parish
- The Trotter family of Mortonhall
- William Trotter of Ballindean (1772–1833), famous furniture maker and also Lord Provost 1825 to 1827
- William Tytler (1711–1792), father of Alexander Fraser Tytler (1747–1813), grandson of Patrick Fraser Tytler (1789–1849) (CP)

=== W ===
- Barbara and Mary Walker of Coates, rich spinsters who paid for St Mary's Episcopal Cathedral in the west of the city
- William Wallace (1768–1843), mathematician
- George Watson (1654–1723), accountant and founder of George Watson's College
- James Watson (died 1722), printer and publisher. Founder of the Edinburgh Gazette and Edinburgh Courant.
- John Watson W.S. (died 1762), founder of John Watson's Institution, now the Gallery of Modern Art
- Robert Whytt (1714–1766), physician and president of the Royal College of Physicians of Edinburgh (CP)
- John Wilson of Kilmaurs, executed 22 December 1666 for his part in the Pentland Rising
- Patrick Wilson (1798–1871), architect
- Very Rev William Wishart (1660–1729), father of William Wishart (secundus) (CP)
- William Wright (1735–1819), botanist

== Gallery ==
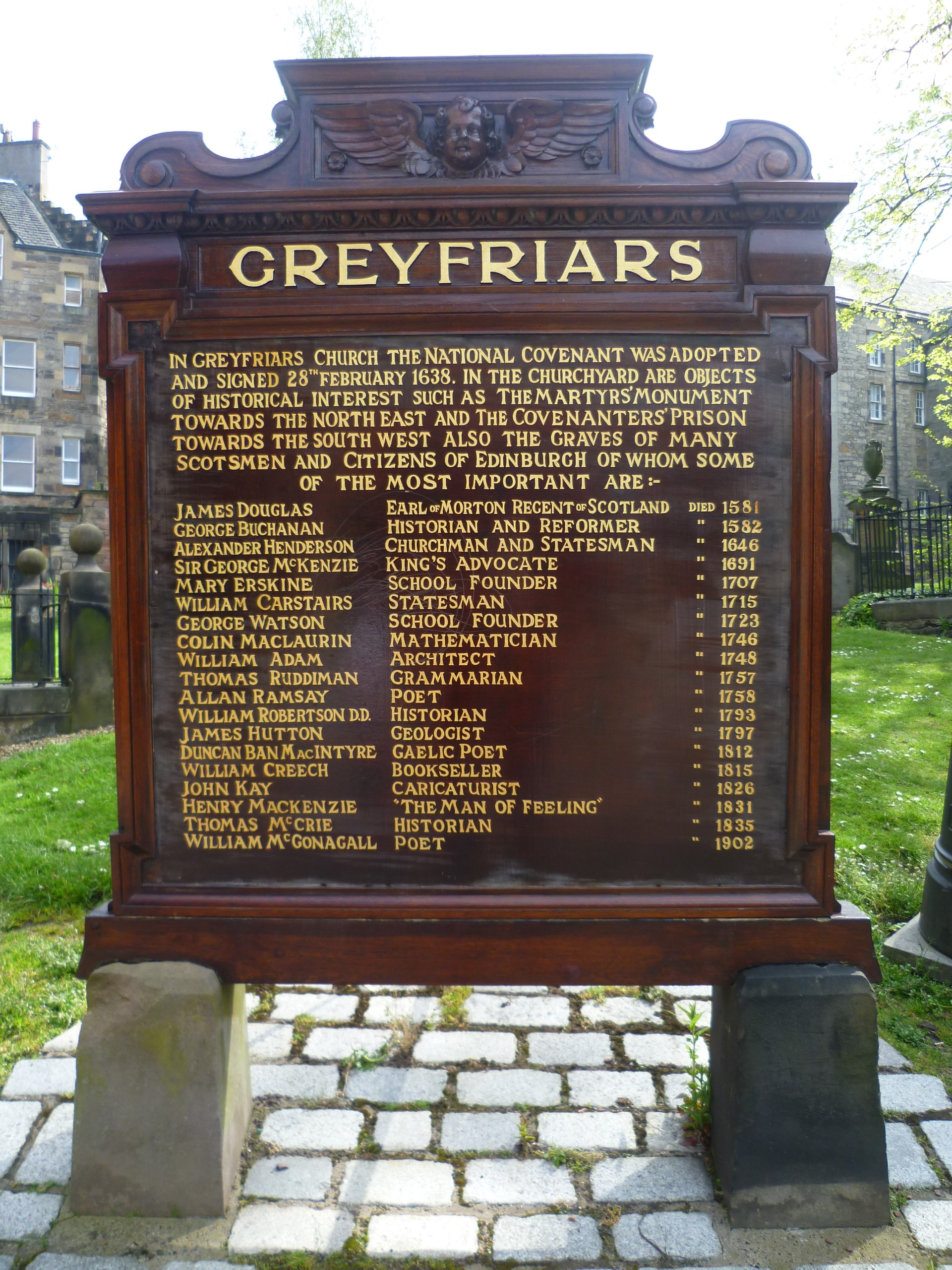
Notable burials

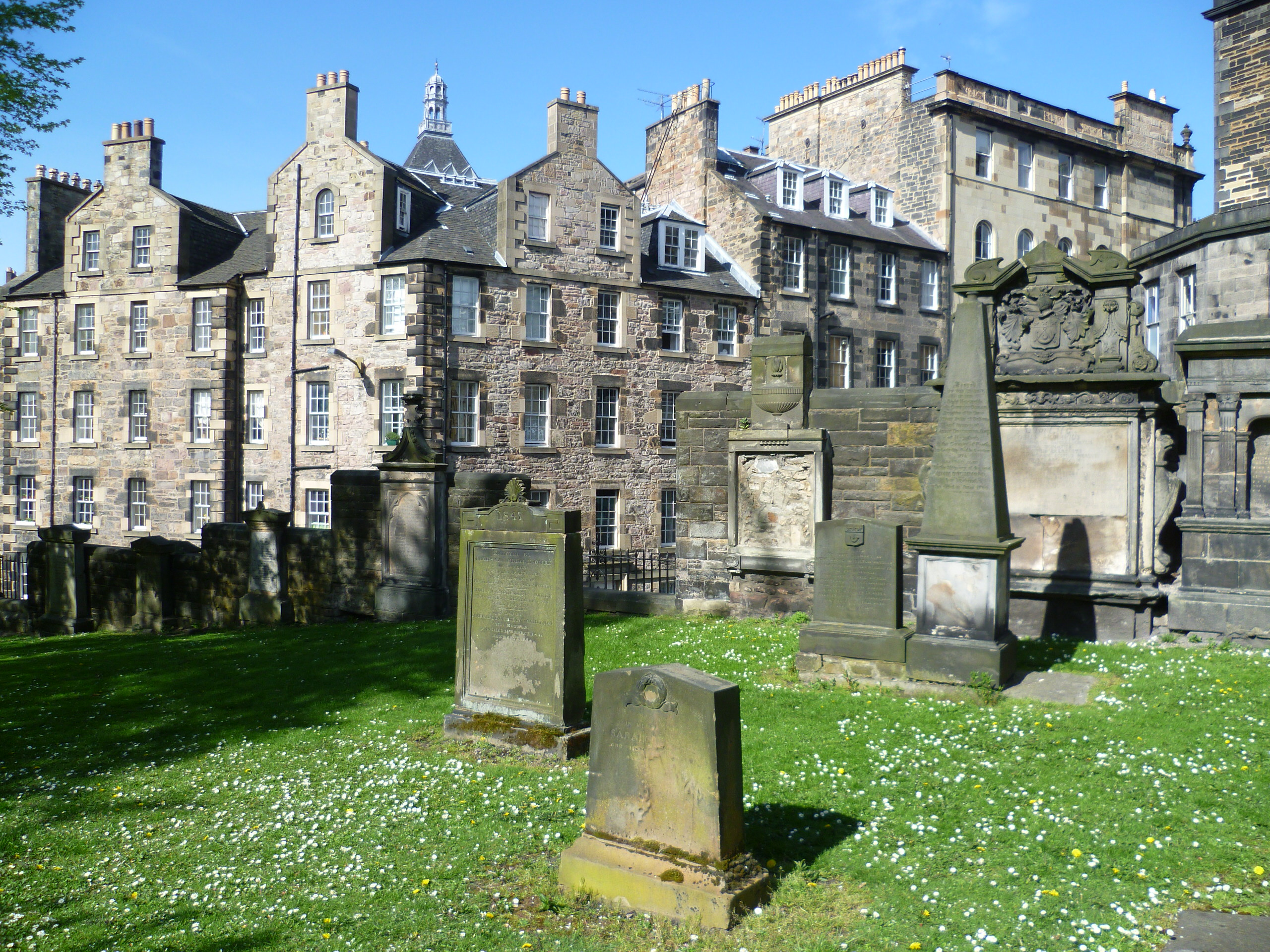
Section of the east wall

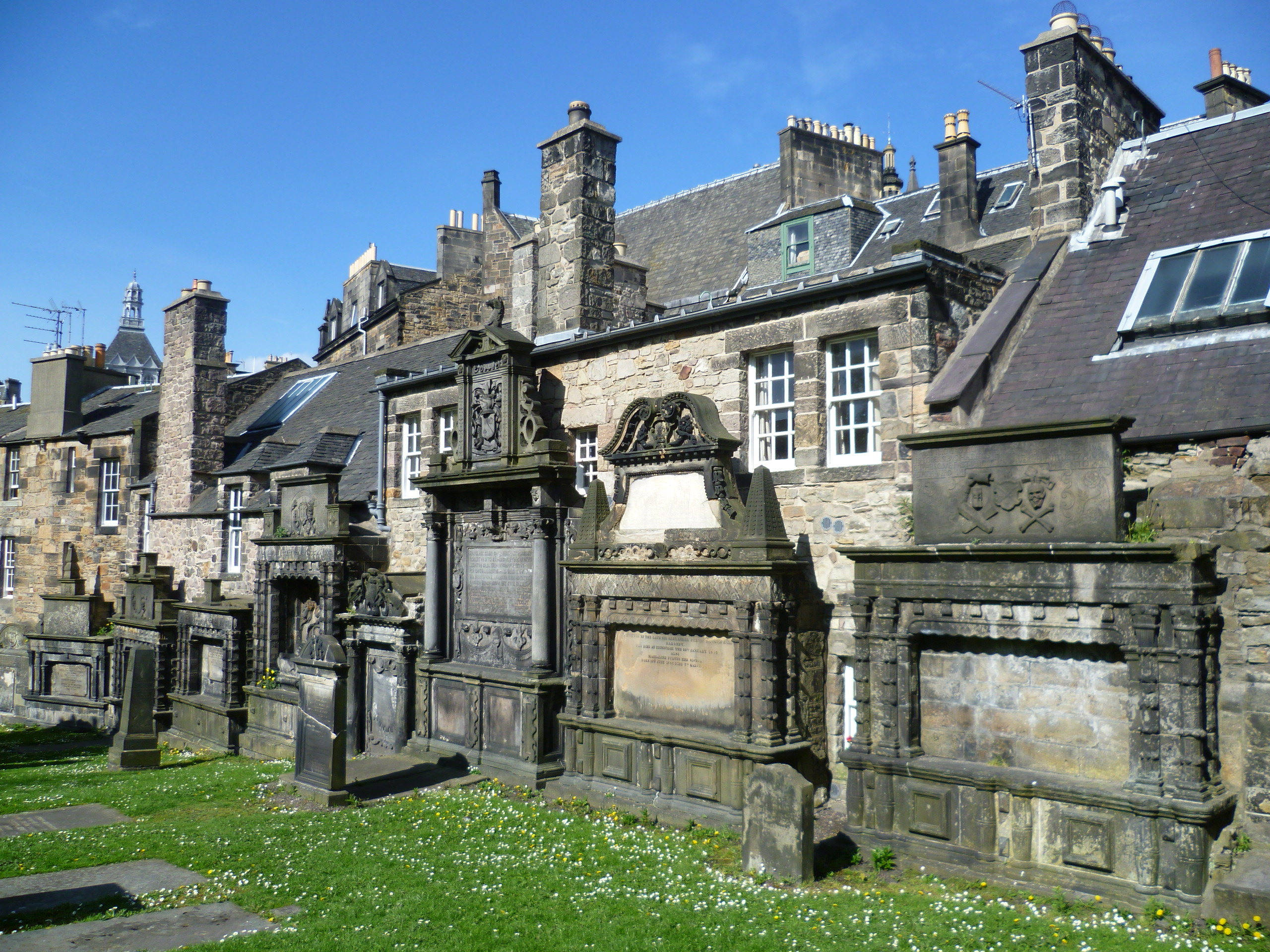
Monuments on the east wall

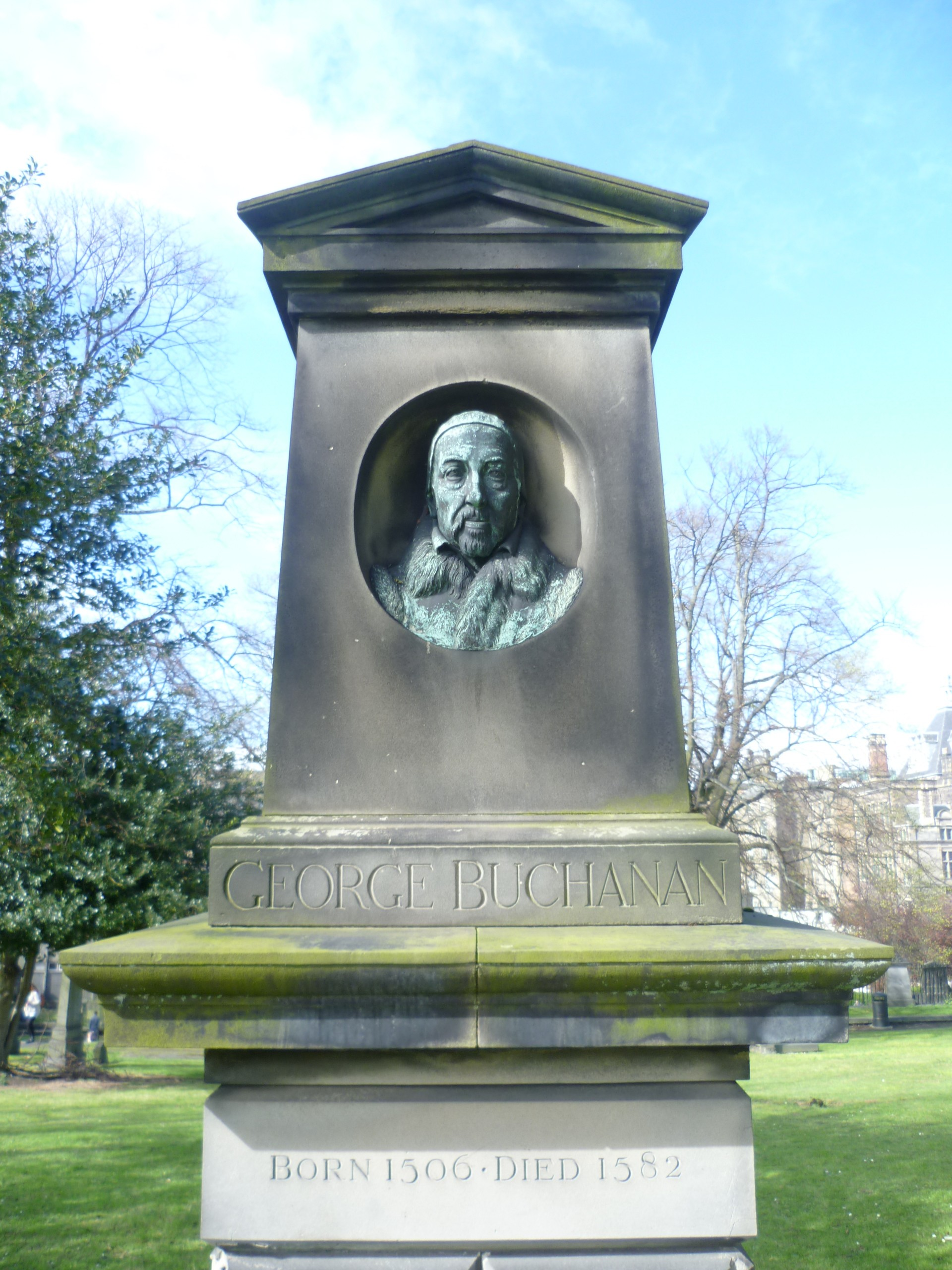
George Buchanan Memorial

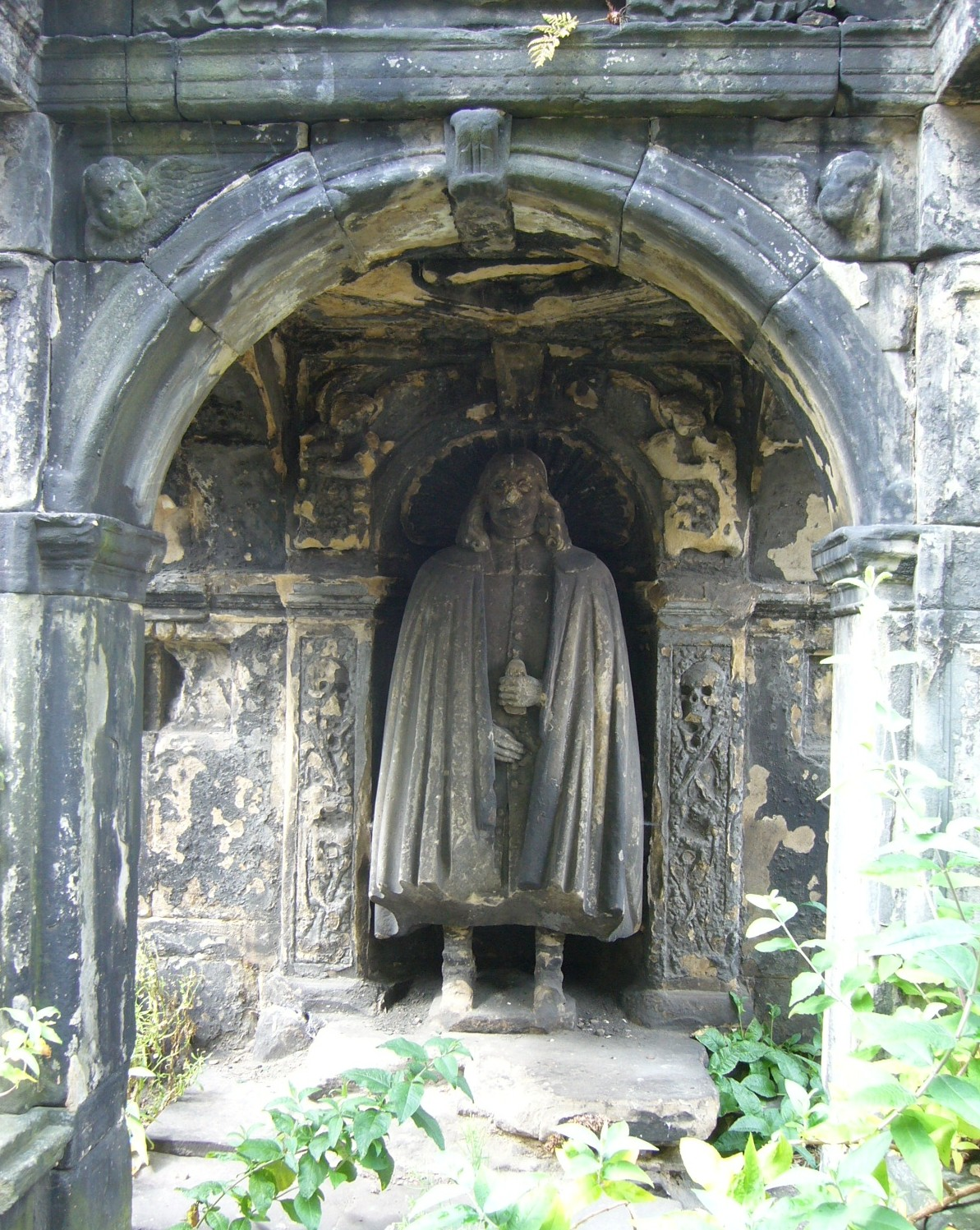
Tomb of John Bayne of Pitcairlie (17th c.)

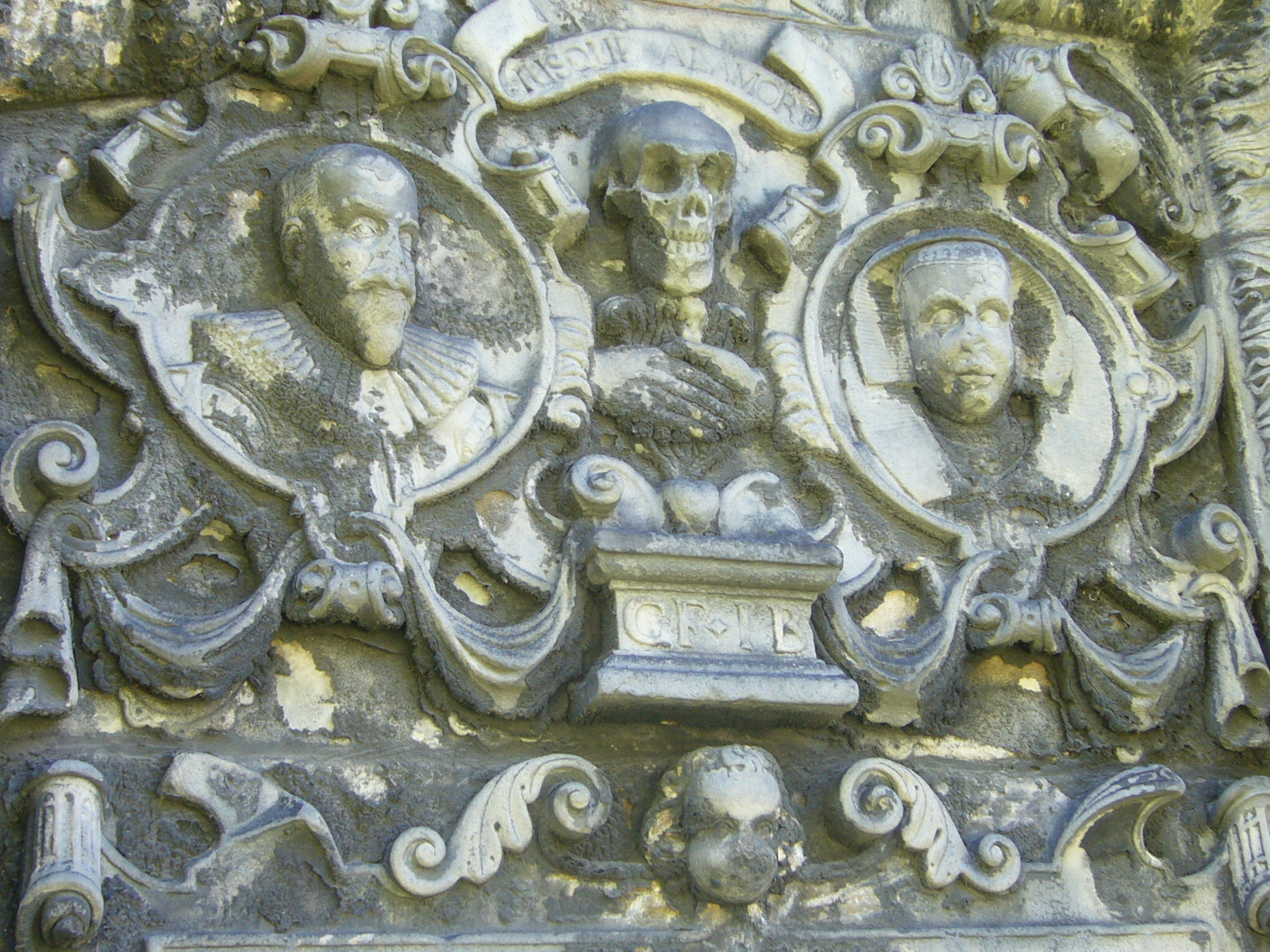
Detail on the tomb of George Foulis, laird of Ravilstoun (d. 1633) and his wife, Jane Bannatyne

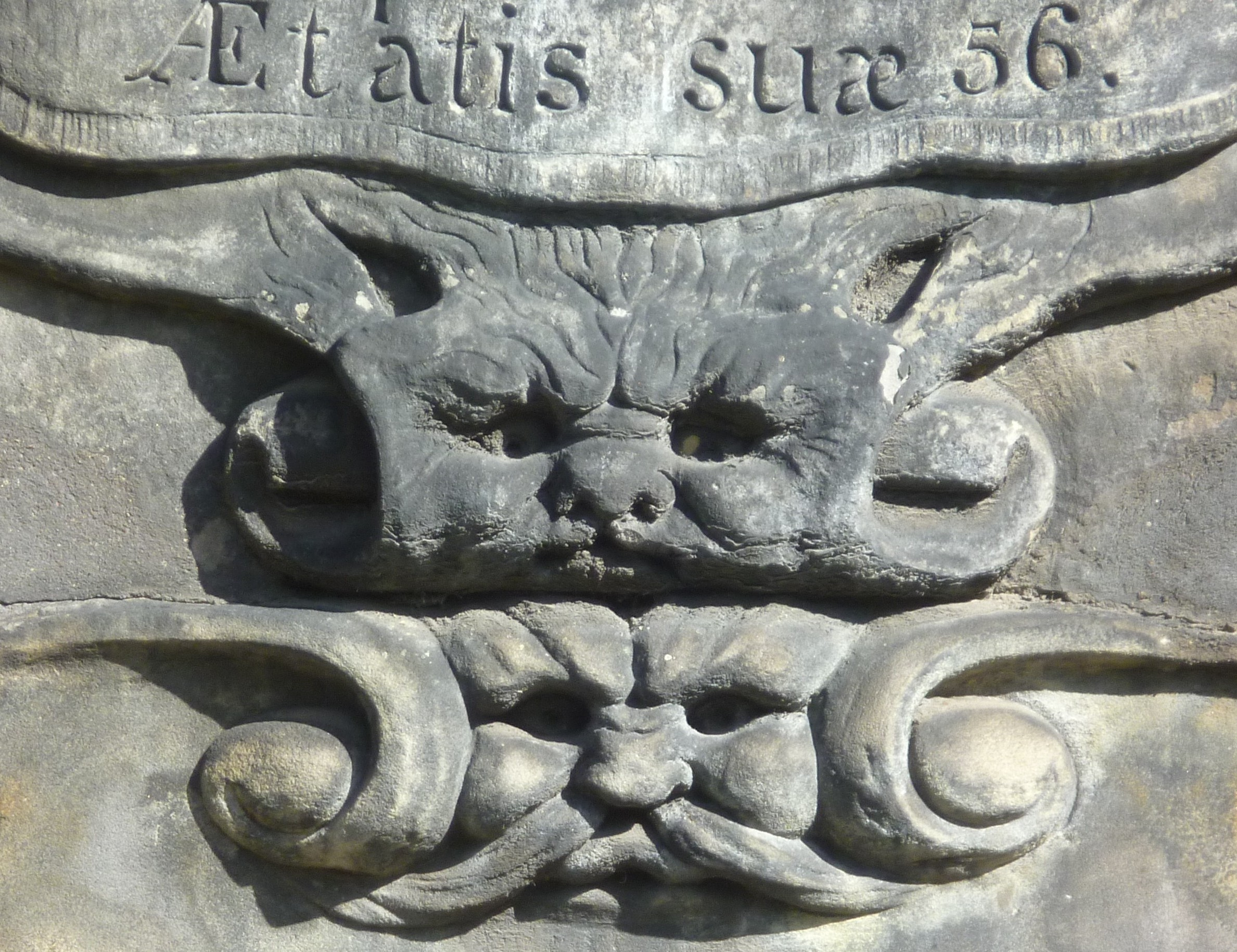
Detail on the John Mylne Monument (17th c.)

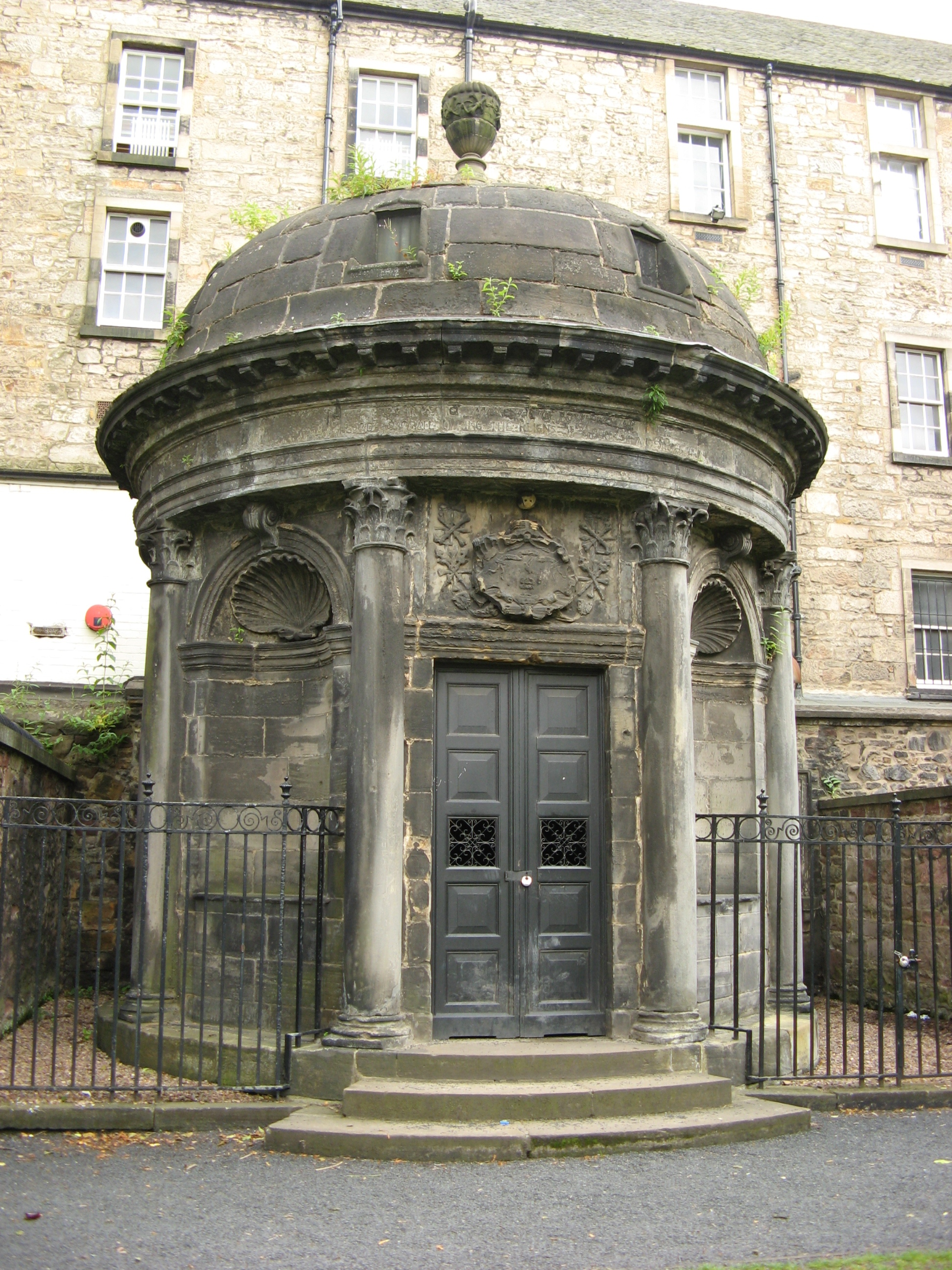
Mausoleum of Sir George Mackenzie, by James Smith

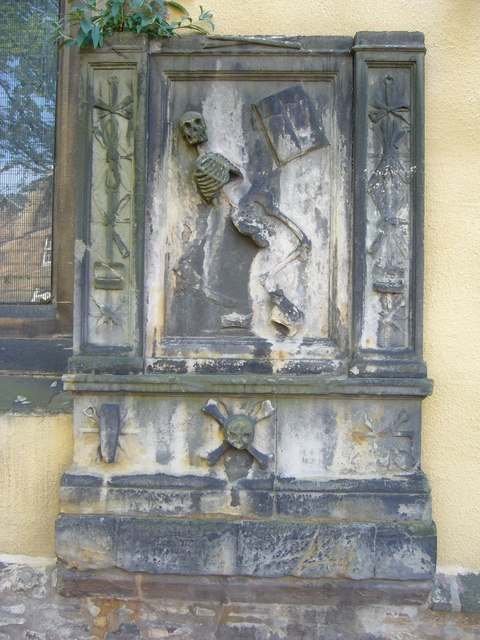
Tombstone of James Borthwick, surgeon, who died in 1676

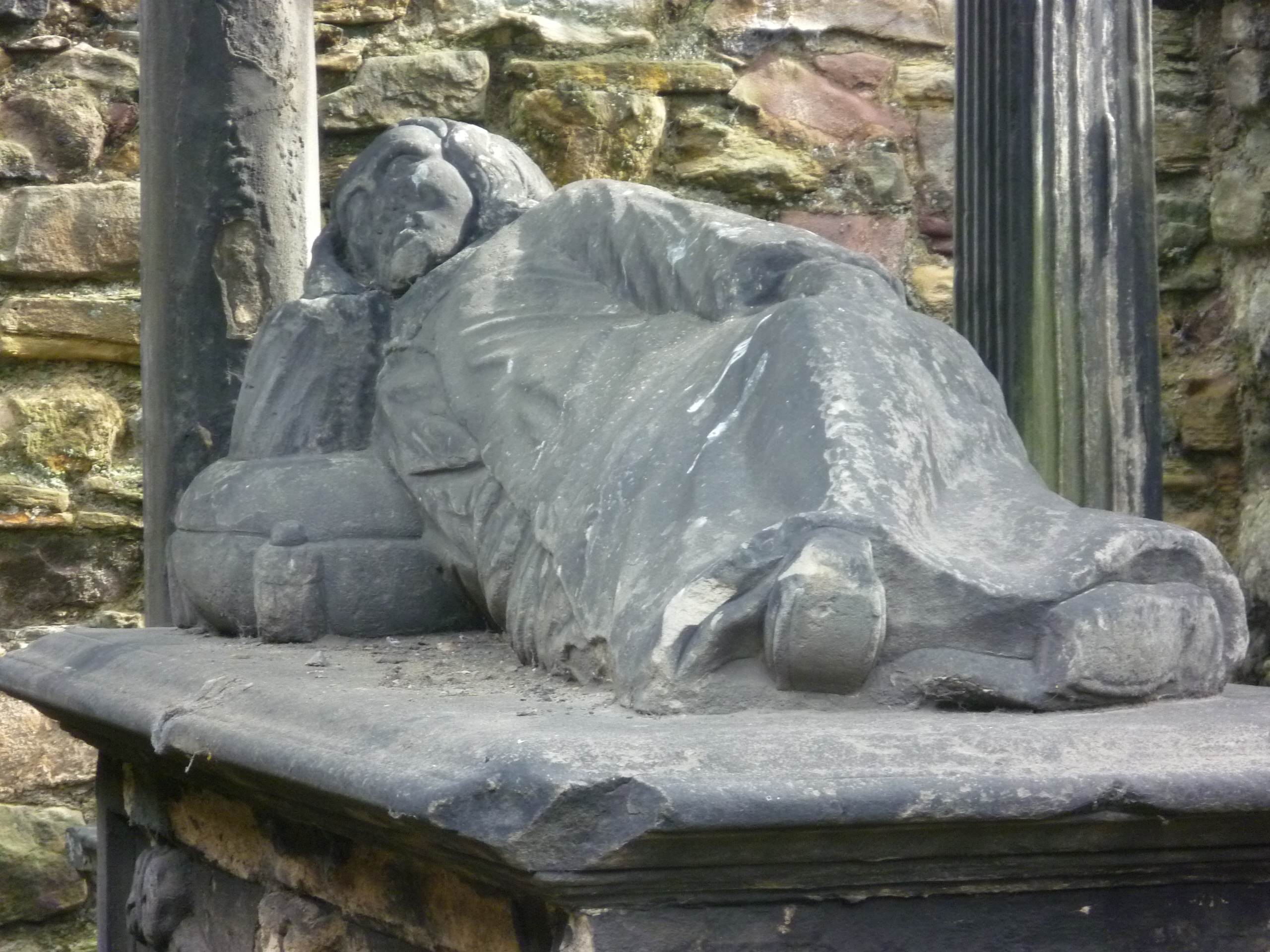
Recumbent figure on the tomb of William and Clement Little, 1683

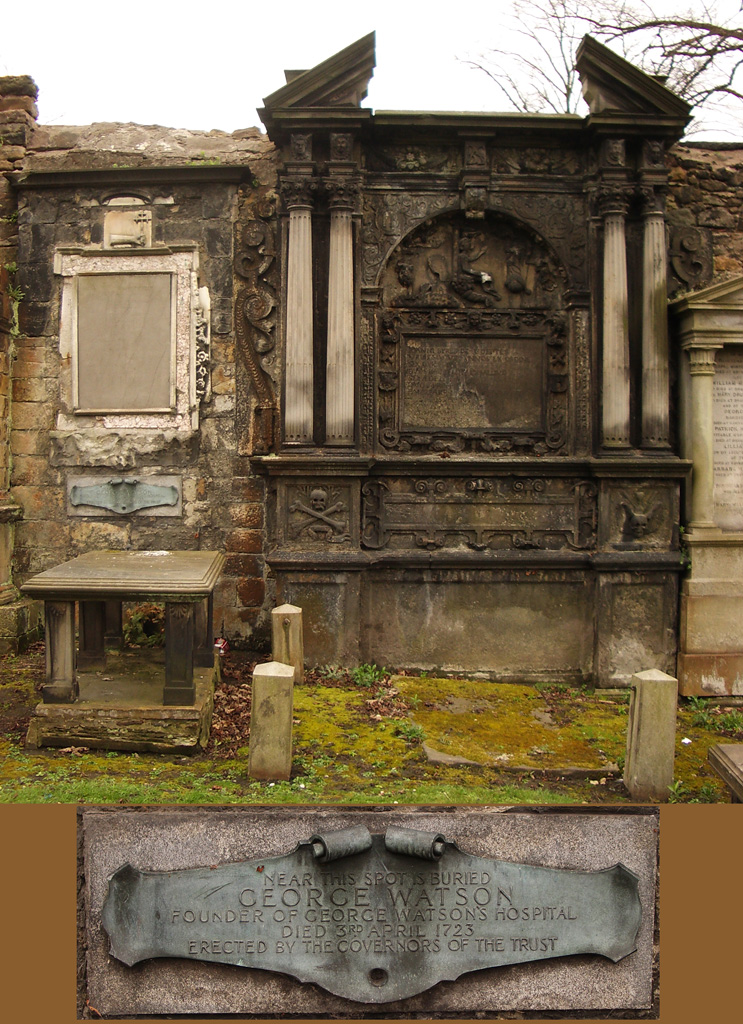
Gravestones in the north-west of the kirkyard, including a marker for the burial site of George Watson
