= John Wayne (disambiguation) =

John Wayne (1907–1979) was an American actor and filmmaker.

John Wayne may also refer to:

- P-38 can opener, U.S. military equipment sometimes known as the "John Wayne"

== People ==
- John Wayne Bobbitt, former husband of Lorena Bobbitt
- John Wayne Gacy (1942–1994), American serial killer
- John Wayne Glover (1932–2005), English and Australian serial killer
- John Wayne Hibbert (born 1984), English boxer
- John Wayne Murdoch (born 1988), American professional wrestler
- John Wayne Niles (c. 1842–?), American politician
- John Wayne Parr (born 1976), Australian martial artist
- John Wayne Sace (born 1989), Filipino actor
- Johnny Wayne (1918–1990), Canadian comedian

== Places ==
- John Wayne Airport, Orange County, California
- John Wayne Elementary School, Brooklyn, New York
- John Wayne Parkway, Arizona State Route 347
- John Wayne Pioneer Trail, Washington, US

== Fictional characters ==
- John Wayne, student at the Enfield Tennis Academy in the 1996 novel Infinite Jest

== Music ==
- "John Wayne" (song) by Lady Gaga
- "John Wayne", a song from Billy Idol's 2008 album The Very Best of Billy Idol: Idolize Yourself
  - "John Wayne", a re-recorded version of the above featuring Alison Mosshart from Billy Idol's 2025 album Dream Into It
- "John Wayne", a song from Cigarettes After Sex's 2017 self-titled album
- "John Wayne", a song from Electrelane's 2006 album Singles, B-Sides & Live
- "John Wayne", a song from Denzel Curry's 2022 album Melt My Eyez See Your Future
- John Wayne, an album by Terry Scott Taylor

== See also ==
- John Wain
- John Waine
- John Bayne (disambiguation)
- Jon Wayne, an American cowpunk band active in the 1980s
- Jonwayne, American hip-hop artist and rapper
