= John Baines =

John Baines may refer to:

- John Baines (Egyptologist) (born 1946), professor of Egyptology at the University of Oxford
- John Baines (bobsledder) (born 1985), British bobsledder
- John Baines (footballer) (born 1937), English footballer
- John Baines (mathematician) (1787–1838), English mathematician

== See also ==
- John Baine (disambiguation)
- John Bayne (disambiguation)
- John Baynes (1758–1787), English lawyer and writer
- John Baynes of the Baynes baronets
