= William Annand (minister) =

Scottish minister of the Church of Scotland

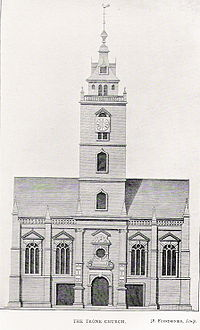
Tron Kirk

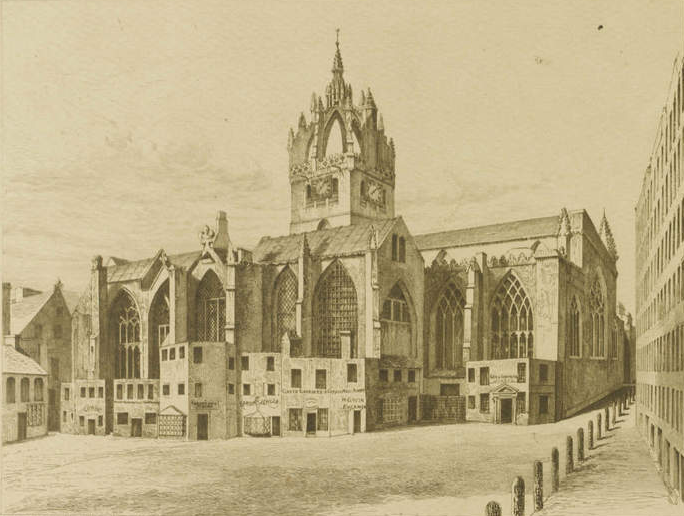
St Giles High Church

William Annand (1633 – 13 June 1689) was a Scottish minister of the Church of Scotland who was the Dean of St Giles Cathedral in Edinburgh, Scotland.

== Life ==
William Annand was born in Ayr, the son of Rev William Annand (d.1663), minister of Ayr, and his wife, Margaret Lindsay. His father was formerly from Kent and had served in both Throwley and Leaveland.

He was educated at King's College and the University of Aberdeen, where he received a Master of Arts degree in 1649. He then gained a BA degree from University College, Oxford, in 1655. He was ordained in 1656 by an Irish bishop, Thomas, Bishop of Ardfert, and was awarded an MA degree in 1658. He was an Anglican minister at Weston-in-the-Green and the vicar of Leighton Buzzard in 1656, and chaplain to John Middleton, 1st Earl of Middleton.

He returned to Scotland as minister of Tolbooth parish in Edinburgh from 1663 to 1672 (preaching from the north-west quarter of St Giles), and of Tron Kirk in Edinburgh from 1672 to 1675. He became Dean of the High Church (St Giles) Edinburgh in 1675.

He was awarded an honorary Doctor of Divinity (DD) by St Andrew's University in 1685.

He died in Edinburgh on 13 June 1689 and is buried in Greyfriars Kirkyard.

== Family ==
On 14 January 1670 he married Helen Lundie (d.1687) and they had a daughter, Barbara (d.1687).

== Writings ==
- A funeral elegie, upon the death of George Sonds, Esq; &c. Who was killed by his brother, Mr. Freeman Sonds, August the 7th. anno Dom. 1655. London, 1655.
- Panem quotidianum, or, A short discourse tending to prove the legality, decency, and expediency of set forms of prayer in the churches of Christ : with a particular defence of the Book of Common Prayer of the Church of England. London, 1660.
- Fides Catholica, or, The doctrine of the Catholick Church, in eighteen grand ordinances referring to the Word, sacraments and prayer, in purity, number and nature, catholically maintained, and publickly taught against hereticks of all sorts : with the solutions of many proper and profitable questions sutable to the nature of each ordinance treated of. London, 1661.
- Pater noster, Our Father, or, The Lord's prayer explained, the sense thereof and duties therein from Scripture, history, and fathers, methodically cleared and succinctly opened. Edinburgh, 1670.
- Mysterium pietatis or The mysterie of godlinesse wherein the mysteries contained in the incarnation, circumcision, wise-men, passion, resurrection, ascension of the Son of God, and comeing of the Holy-Ghost, are unfolded and applied. London, 1671.
- Doxologia, or, Glory to the Father: the Churches hymne, reduced to glorifying of the Trinity, in life, the Christians dutie. London, 1672.
- Dualitas, or, A two-fold subject displayed and opened conducible to godliness and peace : in order, I. Lex loquens, the honour and dignity of magistracy with the duties thereupon depending and reverence thereunto due, II. Duorum unitas, the agreement of magistracy and ministry, at the election of the honourable magistrates of Edinburgh and the opening of a diocesan synod of the reverend clergy there. London, 1674.

== Sources ==
- David M. Bertie, Scottish Episcopal Clergy, 1689-2000, Edinburgh, 2000.
