= John Bayne (Presbyterian minister) =

John Bayne (16 November 1806 – 3 November 1859) was a Presbyterian minister. He was born in Greenock, Scotland and educated at the universities of Glasgow and Edinburgh.

Bayne served in some junior positions within the church and, after his ordination, traveled to Upper Canada to serve as a missionary, arriving about the end of 1834. After a brief posting in Toronto to fill in for a time, he accepted an invitation to serve the congregation of St Andrew's in Galt (now Cambridge), Ontario.

Bayne commenced an enduring ministry that lasted until his death although his original plans were to serve only temporarily in Upper Canada.
