= John Bayne of Pitcairlie =

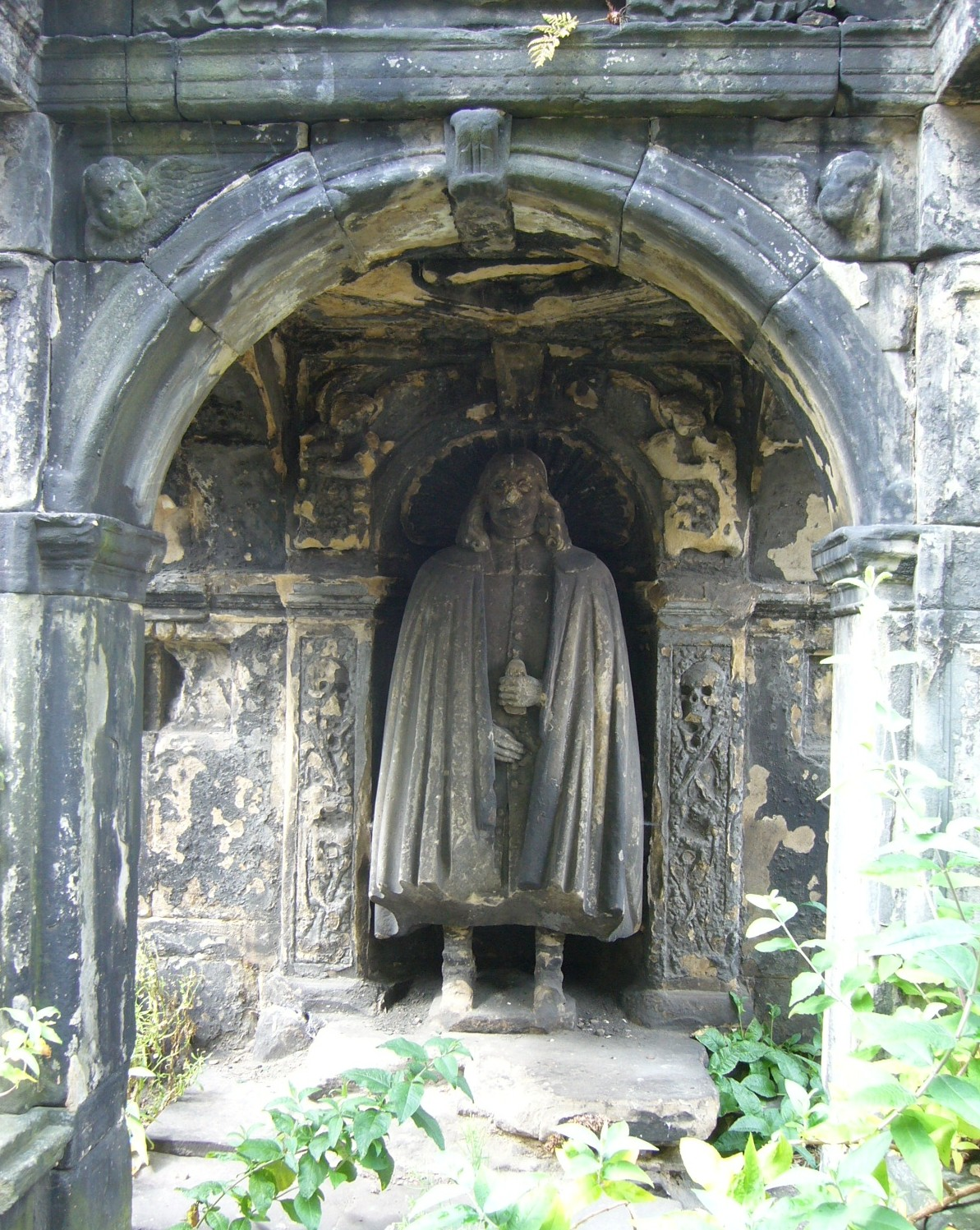
Bayne's mausoleum in Greyfriars Kirkyard

John Bayne of Pitcairlie (1620–1681) was a writer to the Signet (lawyer) born in Scotland. Known for his work on important contracts such as those relating to the 1672 renovation of Holyrood Palace, he ran a legal team which is linked to several notable architects and major building projects in Edinburgh.

== Pitcairlie's origin ==
Pitcairlie's father was Donald Bayne (c. 1580–1648), a bower burgess in Edinburgh. Donald was apprenticed to William Mayne, Master Bowar to James VI and also famed for making golf clubs. Donald Bayne married, as his first wife, Eupham Mayne who may have been the daughter of this William Mayne. Donald Bayne married his second wife, Beatrix Richardsone, in 1613. In addition to the bow making business Donald and Beatrix also ran a tavern on the High Street. Their home, which was on the north side of the High Street, close to John Knox’s house, was eventually inherited by John Bayne of Pitcairlie. As heritors, Donald Bayne and Beatrix Richardsone received a tax demand from the Town Council to help finance the construction of Parliament Hall, that was completed 1639. In 1637 Donald married Marjorie Liddail as his third wife.

== Heraldic connections ==
John Bayne registered his coat of arms in 1672. His motif of a 'wolf's head' confirms that he was a descendant of the Baynes of Tulloch, Dingwall, Ross-shire. This wolf's head emblem was also used by Sir Donald Bayne, (1640–1716), 5th of Tulloch and Alexander Bayne (1515–1600), 2nd of Tulloch. Lawrence traces the ancestry of the Baynes of Tulloch back from Clan MacKay through to the MacEths and then to Lulach, King of Scots (1032–1058). If accurate, the connection with this long lineage greatly enhances the historical significance of Pitcairlie's mausoleum.

== Family ==
John Bayne married Eupham (Euphemia) Aikman in 1643. Eupham was the daughter of Grissell Mershall and Henry Aikman, a surgeon and member of the Town Council. John and Eupham had four children but it is assumed that they all died young: on his death in 1681 there were no offspring to be heirs to his estate, and Eupham's heir on her death in 1686 was her brother, Andrew Ackerman. John Bayne was born in Edinburgh, married in Edinburgh and was buried in Edinburgh. He lived and worked at the very centre of Edinburgh dealing with merchants and politicians. Despite his Pitcairlie estate in Fife, John Bayne was very much a city business man.

== Writer to the Signet ==
John Bayne qualified as a writer to the signet in 1655, when he was 35 years old. He managed a small legal team and in 1672 supervised the preparation of the building contracts for the renovation of Holyrood Palace. He was probably the 'John Bayne' who was asked to audit the business affairs of the then Clerk to the Bills, Sir William Bruce. John Bayne's contact with Sir William Bruce, Robert Mylne, H.M. Master Mason and James Smith, architect, links him to many historical buildings in Edinburgh, i.e. Holyrood Palace, Canongate Kirk, the water cisterns on the High Street, Tron Kirk, Mylne's Court, St Giles' Cathedral, Heriot's School, and the George Mackenzie's mausoleum. Pitcairlie's superior was Sir William Sharp, Depute Keeper of the Signet and H.M. Cash Keeper, whose brother James Sharp, archbishop of St Andrews, was assassinated by the Covenanters in 1679.

=== Man of property ===
In 1657 John Bayne acquired part of the estate of Lindores, Fife, from the Leslie family. In 1658 he acquired the adjacent Pitcairlie estate. In 1660 he acquired the lands of Auldhame, Soytterland and Skoughall from John Auchmuty, H.M.'s Master of the Wardrobe. In 1670 Bayne acquired the land at Lummbennie that lies adjacent to the Pitcairlie estate, thus consolidating his estate holdings. In 1677, the fire-damaged properties adjacent to the Parliament Hall were valued. The land was cleared and compensation paid. Pitcairlie owned a property, his writing chambers, that was affected by this re-development, and he was offered compensation as part of the re-development of the site. He later had a stone tenement building built facing onto Parliament Close.

In 1685 four years after his death, there was a Great Seal Charter by James VII to Sir Donald Bayne, for the lands of Pitcairlie. The Pitcairlie estate was inherited in succession from Sir Donald Bayne, 5th of Tulloch through the generations, down to Kenneth 8th of Tulloch, until finally in 1713 it was sold to James Taylor W.S.

=== Student bursaries ===
John Bayne endowed student bursaries for the Universities of St Andrews and Edinburgh. Two of his friends initially administered or perhaps failed to administer these bursaries. Sir William Bruce, (1630–1710) Surveyor-General of the Royal Works in Scotland, who was responsible for the renovation of Holyrood Palace in 1672, had the patronage for the St Andrews 'Bayne bursaries'. Sir John Nisbet, (1609–1687) the Lord Advocate, held the patronage for the Edinburgh university Bayne bursaries. Sir Donald Bayne, 5th of Tulloch eventually gained control of these bursaries. The Bayne bursaries, under different patrons, were still awarded up until 1901.

== Mausoleum ==
Eupham Aikman was responsible for settling all the outstanding financial affairs on behalf of her husband. In 1684 she obtained permission from the Town Council to erect a monument in honour of her husband, John Bayne. Two masons Philip Alisone and Patrick Hunter built the tomb. When first built, the mausoleum was painted and gilded by James Andersone making it a striking and opulent tomb. The names of the architect and sculptor is unknown.

In 1704, Robert Monteith made a record of monumental inscriptions from several cemeteries. His translation of the original Latin inscription on the Pitcairlie tomb included a reference to 'both wives'. Despite considerable investigation, no evidence has been found to confirm that John Bayne had been married twice, quite the contrary. It is hypothesised that there was an error made in the translation of the original Latin epitaph. This inscription has disappeared and is no longer to be seen on the Pitcairlie monument.

The mausoleum inscription is rendered into English as "To the Memory of the learned Mr. John Bayne of Pitcairlie, an eminent Writer to the Signet, Eupham Aikman his Widow, for themselves, and for the Kindred of both Wives, caused this Monument to be erected. He died the 28th January, in the 60th Year of his Age" in The History of Edinburgh from Its Foundation to the Present Time.

=== Cemetery connections ===
Several tombs, in Greyfriars Kirkyard, belonging to associates of John Bayne, have since disappeared. There are four notable, surviving, tombstones that are linked to John Bayne of Pitcairlie.

- Robert Mylne (1633–1710).

Robert was Master Mason to the Crown of Scotland. In 1672 Mylne rebuilt Holyrood Palace. John Bayne, as writer to the signet, supervised the preparation of these building contracts and therefore would have had business dealings with Mylne.

- John Cunningham.

John Cunningham W.S. [later ‘of Enterkine’] worked as part of John Bayne's legal team. Cunningham prepared one of the building contracts for the rebuilding of Holyrood Palace in 1762. He too would have had business dealings with Robert Mylne. John Cunningham erected a magnificent tombstone to his wife Elizabeth Paton.

- James McLurge of Vogrie (1629–1717).

McLuge, brother-in-law to John Bayne, was a merchant in Edinburgh. In 1668 he married Marion Aikman, sister of Eupham Aikman, as her second husband. James McLurge was Dean of Guild of Edinburgh on four occasions 1689, 1690, 1699 and 1700. He left a substantial amount of money to charitable causes. Sir James McLurge's monument is on the north wall, within the Covenanter's Prison section of the Kirkyard.

- Sir Hugh McCulloch.

Sir Hugh McCulloch rented rooms in John Bayne's tenement in Parliament Close.

== Legacy ==
George Dallas was apprenticed to John Bayne. In his book A System of Styles, 1697, Dallas described John Bayne as: "A great penman in his age, and so known". and from Robert Monteith in 1704, a transcription of the mausoleum's epitaph that reads: "To the Memory of that most learned Man, Mr. John Bayne of Pitcairlie, a famous Writer to the Signet; and Eupham Aikman his widow……"
